= Barksdale Hamlett =

United States Army general

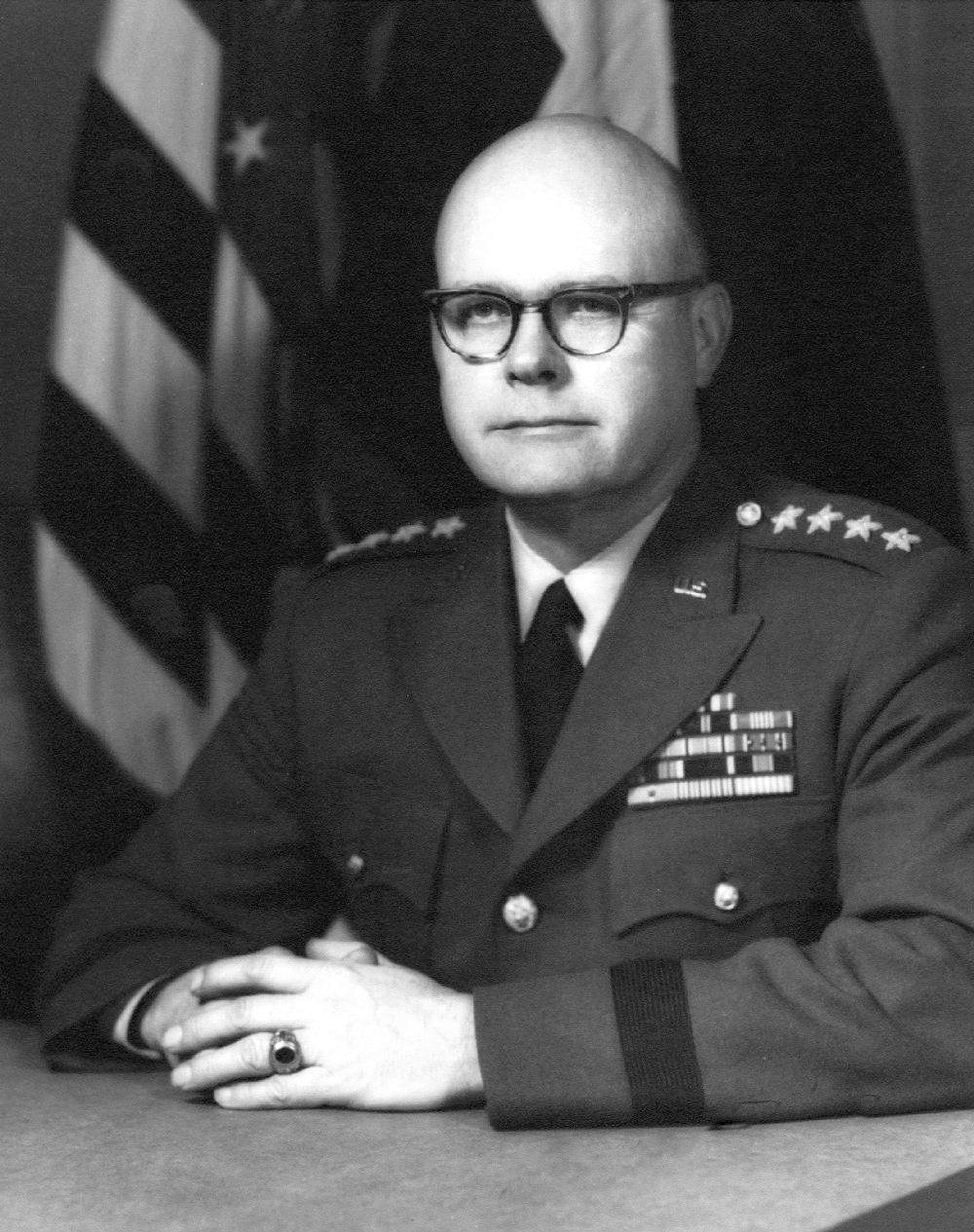
- Born: 30 December 1908; Hopkinsville, Kentucky, US
- Died: 26 August 1979 (aged 70); Washington, D.C., US
- Burial place: West Point Cemetery
- Military career
- Allegiance: United States
- Branch: United States Army
- Service years: 1930–1964
- Rank: General
- Service number: 0-18143
- Commands: Vice Chief of Staff of the United States Army; American sector of Berlin; 10th Infantry Division
- Conflicts: World War II; Korean War
- Awards: Army Distinguished Service Medal; Silver Star; Legion of Merit (2); Bronze Star Medal
- Other work: President, Norwich University

Barksdale Hamlett Jr. (30 December 1908 – 26 August 1979) was a United States Army four-star general who served as commandant of the American sector of Berlin during the 1958 Berlin crisis and as Vice Chief of Staff of the United States Army from 1962 to 1964. He later served as President of Norwich University in Vermont.

== Early career ==
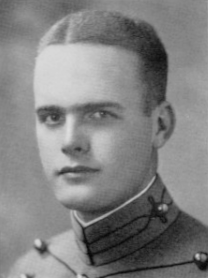
As a West Point cadet

Hamlett was born in Hopkinsville, Kentucky, to Barksdale Hamlett Sr. and Daisey C. Hamlett. When he was three, his family moved to Frankfort, Kentucky when his father was elected superintendent of public instruction for the state of Kentucky, but later relocated to Columbia, Kentucky. As a junior at Adair County High School, he received an appointment to the United States Naval Academy at Annapolis from Congressman Ralph Gilbert, to begin in 1925. However, Gilbert revoked the appointment after traveling to the Far East that summer on a Navy cruiser and being appalled by what he considered to be excessive drinking by the ship's officers during port calls. Instead, Gilbert substituted an appointment to the United States Military Academy at West Point for the following year. Hamlett spent the intervening year at Lindsey Wilson Junior College and entered the Military Academy on 1 July 1926, where he roomed with future four-star general Hamilton H. Howze. Graduating in 1930 in the middle of his class, he was commissioned a second lieutenant in the field artillery.

Hamlett's first assignment was in C Battery, 12th Field Artillery, 2nd Infantry Division, Fort Sam Houston, Texas. In 1932 he was assigned as motors officer and later battery executive in B Battery, 11th Field Artillery, Hawaiian Division, Schofield Barracks, Hawaii, which won the prestigious Knox Trophy that year as the best Field Artillery battery in the army. In 1934 he was transferred to the 18th Field Artillery, Fort Sill, Oklahoma, but was almost immediately reassigned as assistant post signal officer at Fort Sill, where the following year he attended the Regular Course and Advanced Motors Course at the Field Artillery School. He then served a three-year tour at Fort Sam Houston as regimental motors officer and later regimental adjutant for the 15th Field Artillery, and finished his tour as an aide to Brigadier General Lesley J. McNair.

In 1939, Hamlett reported to the 1st Balloon Squadron, Army Air Corps, Post Field, where he was rated as a free balloon pilot, captive balloon pilot, and motorized balloon pilot. He abandoned the Air Corps upon receiving his desired assignment as a gunnery instructor at the field artillery school at Fort Sill. He was promoted to captain in 1940 by new legislation that automatically advanced every regular officer with at least 10 years of service.

== World War II ==
Following the attack on Pearl Harbor, Hamlett was recruited to be corps artillery executive for II Corps. In 1942 he landed with the 1st Infantry Division on Arzew Beach near Oran, Morocco during the Allied invasion of North Africa. Drawing on his experience as an instructor at Fort Sill, he helped reorganize the previously ineffective corps artillery, helping mold it into a decisive arm. It was particularly noted for its ability to mass concentrated fire at the Battle of El Guettar.

In July 1943, Hamlett was transferred back to Washington, D.C. at the request of now-Lieutenant General McNair. As commander of Army Ground Forces, McNair was responsible for training all stateside divisions, corps, and armies in preparation for deployment overseas, and he requisitioned combat-experienced officers from all branches to develop the training curricula and supervise the tests. At Army Ground Force Headquarters, Hamlett's first assignment was to write the manual on corps artillery doctrine, based on his observations in North Africa. He remained at Army Ground Forces as assistant G-3 until September 1944.

When his mentor McNair was killed on an inspection tour in France, Hamlett immediately secured assignment as division artillery commander for the John L. Pierce's 16th Armored Division, in which role he was promoted to colonel. The division saw light action in Germany and advanced into Czechoslovakia, liberating Plzeň before being ordered to halt short of Prague. The division withdrew to Sudeten mountains, where Hamlett became the military governor of a district containing 187 towns and villages. Following the German surrender, the 16th Armored Division was inactivated and its artillery elements were folded into the 190th Field Artillery Group, a unit selected for the invasion of Japan. Hamlett was group commander for one month before Japan capitulated and he was transferred to the 15th Army Group to help write the after battle reports of World War II.

After the war, Hamlett spent a year of study at the École Militaire in Paris, France and graduated from the École supérieure de guerre in 1946, before returning to the United States to serve as director of the Gunnery Department at Fort Sill. He was a student at the National War College from 1948 to 1949.

== Korean War ==
In December 1949, Hamlett was ordered to the headquarters of General of the Army Douglas MacArthur as executive officer of the logistics section (G-4), GHQ, Japan. At the start of the Korean War, he served as chief of the Supply Division and later, as G-4 chief of planning, he supervised the logistics planning for the Inchon landing. In December 1951, he went to Korea himself as division artillery commander for the 24th Infantry Division.

Hamlett was promoted to brigadier general in 1952 and assigned to the General Staff in Washington, D.C. as assistant for planning coordination in the office of the deputy chief of staff for plans. He returned to Europe in 1955 as corps artillery commander for VII Corps. Promoted to major general on 17 May 1956, he succeeded George E. Martin as commander of the 10th Infantry Division in Würzburg before being transferred to command the American garrison in West Berlin.

== Commandant of Berlin ==
As commandant of the American sector of Berlin from 4 June 1957 to 15 December 1959, Hamlett commanded a 4,000-man garrison in the southwest corner of West Berlin and was deputy chief of mission to Ambassador David K.E. Bruce in Bonn. His tour coincided with the 1958 Berlin crisis, which began when Soviet Premier Nikita Khrushchev issued an ultimatum demanding that the occupation of Berlin be terminated within six months. Tensions escalated as the Soviets began interfering with Western access to Berlin by detaining United States convoys on the autobahn for hours. In January 1959, Hamlett's own wife was halted by East German police while being driven in a United States Army car from East Berlin to West Berlin. The Western Allies presented a unified diplomatic and military front and the deadline passed without incident.

In October 1959, the East German government declared its intention to fly its new hammer-and-compass flag over the 78 elevated railway stations in the Western sector, since the railway was operated by the East German state railroad system. On 2 November, as chairman of the three-power Allied Kommandatura for that month, Hamlett informed his Soviet counterpart that should the East Germans attempt to fly the flags in the Western sector, then West German police would remove them, and that should the police be prevented from removing the flags, then Allied troops would complete the job and hold the Russians responsible for any resulting disorder. The East Germans backed down on 5 November. Five days later, the army announced that Hamlett had been reassigned to Washington, D.C., stressing that the move was a long-scheduled rotation since the crisis had already extended his tour six months beyond the normal two years. His transfer was interpreted as an indication that the Pentagon believed the immediate danger to West Berlin had passed.

== Army Vice Chief of Staff ==
In January 1960, Hamlett assumed duties as assistant deputy chief of staff for military operations. Twelve months later, he was elevated to deputy chief of staff, and was promoted to lieutenant general on 11 March 1961. As deputy chief of staff for military operations he concentrated on the development of special forces and the new airmobile division.

Promoted to full general in 1962, Hamlett was assigned as Vice Chief of Staff of the United States Army amid speculation that he would soon succeed Army chief of staff General George Decker, who was not expected to be reappointed. As vice chief of staff, Hamlett negotiated the creation of United States Strike Command with Air Force chief of staff General Curtis LeMay, played a key role in army operations during the Cuban Missile Crisis, and participated in the escalation of the Vietnam War. Reflecting on this period later, Hamlett said:

I think the most important thing was something I didn't recommend; and that was that we didn't become involved in Vietnam to the point where we would have to commit combat forces. I think it was a failure, and I would have to say that I shared the responsibility because I didn't see far enough ahead to speak out.

Hamlett was receptive to dissenting views about the progress of the war, most notably arranging for Lieutenant Colonel John Paul Vann to brief the Joint Chiefs of Staff (JCS). "Vann had a lot to say about what was going on in Vietnam, which was completely counter to the reports we were receiving through JCS channels. And they were so different that I wanted him to brief the Chiefs." On his own authority, Hamlett scheduled the briefing for 8 July 1963, but it was canceled at the last minute by army chief of staff General Earle G. Wheeler at the behest of JCS chairman General Maxwell D. Taylor, whose protégé, General Paul D. Harkins, commander of United States forces in Vietnam, was producing the optimistic reports that Vann's briefing was intended to contradict.

In March 1964, Hamlett suffered a massive heart attack and was expected to die. A week later, Vice Chief of Naval Operations Admiral Claude V. Ricketts also suffered a heart attack and actually did die. Detecting a trend, Air Force vice chief of staff General William F. McKee visited Hamlett in the hospital and announced his own retirement. "Why? With you lying there like that, and that other fellow already dead? I'll be next, but I'm going to get out before it happens!" Hamlett and McKee both retired later that year.

== President of Norwich University ==
In 1965 Hamlett became president of Norwich University, the oldest military college in the United States. During his tenure he dealt with student unrest and a drop in cadet enrolment that eventually compelled Norwich to merge with Vermont College in Montpelier, Vermont. The Vermont College student body was predominantly women, sparking apprehension that Norwich might lose its military character. "I told the trustees flat out that if you can't accept change, you better prepare yourself for bankruptcy," Hamlett said later. He stepped down in 1972 after completing the merger.

== Personal life ==
After retiring from Norwich University, Hamlett lived in Charleston, South Carolina. He was president of the Retired Officers Association from 1974 to 1975. He died of cardiac arrest at Walter Reed Army Medical Center in 1979 and was buried at West Point.

Hamlett married the former Frances Valencia Underwood on 15 December 1931, and they had one daughter.

== Decorations ==
Here is General Hamlett's ribbon bar:

1st Row	Army Distinguished Service Medal		Silver Star	
2nd Row	Legion of Merit with Oak Leaf Cluster	Bronze Star Medal	Army Commendation Medal	American Defense Service Medal
3rd Row	American Campaign Medal	European-African-Middle Eastern Campaign Medal with three service stars	World War II Victory Medal	Army of Occupation Medal
4th Row	National Defense Service Medal with Oak Leaf Cluster	Korean Service Medal with one service star	Czechoslovak War Cross 1939-1945	United Nations Korea Medal

Military offices
Preceded by Clyde D. Eddleman	Vice Chief of Staff of the United States Army; 1962–1964	Succeeded by Creighton Abrams
