= Lord Bourne =

Lord Bourne may refer to:

- Geoffrey Bourne, Baron Bourne of Atherstone (1902–1982), British Army officer
- Nick Bourne, Baron Bourne of Aberystwyth (born 1952), British politician
