= Roy Redgrave (British Army officer) =

Major-General Sir Roy Redgrave KBE MC
- Born: 16 September 1925; Bucharest, Romania
- Died: 3 July 2011 (aged 85); United Kingdom
- Military career
- Allegiance: United Kingdom
- Branch: British Army
- Service years: 1943−1980
- Rank: Major-General
- Service number: 330640
- Unit: Royal Horse Guards
- Commands: Household Cavalry Regiment; Royal Horse Guards; British Forces in Berlin; Commander of British Forces in Hong Kong
- Conflicts: World War II; Cyprus Emergency
- Awards: Knight Commander of the Order of the British Empire; Military Cross

Major-General Sir Roy Michael Frederick Redgrave KBE MC (16 September 1925 – 3 July 2011) was Commander of British Forces in Hong Kong.

== Early life ==
Redgrave was born at Athénée Palace Hotel in Bucharest and grew up at Doftana, where his father ran an oil-drilling business. His mother, Micheline Capșa, was the daughter of a Romanian army general. As a boy, Redgrave assumed a family connection to the Capșa family behind Bucharest's famous Casa Capșa, which she denied. When the war broke out, he was at school in England and reunited with the family only after the war.

== Military career ==
Educated at Lambrook preparatory school and Sherborne School, Redgrave joined the Royal Horse Guards as a trooper in 1943 during World War II. In 1953 he managed the Hyde Park Horse Camp for the Coronation of the Queen. Then in the late 1950s he was deployed to Cyprus at the height of the EOKA resistance campaign.

He was made commanding officer of the Household Cavalry Regiment in 1962 and of the Royal Horse Guards in 1964. He became commandant of the Royal Armoured Corps Centre in 1974 and commandant of the British Sector in Berlin in 1975. He went on to be commander of British Forces in Hong Kong in 1978 and retired in 1980.

== Family ==
He was related to the Redgrave family of actors, via his father Robin Roy Redgrave, who was the patriarch Roy Redgrave's son by his first wife. Thus, he was a nephew of Sir Michael Redgrave and a first cousin of the half blood of Vanessa, Corin and Lynn Redgrave. He was married to Valerie Wellesley and had two sons.

== Publications ==
- Balkan Blue by Major General Sir Roy Redgrave KBE MC, published by Pen & Sword, London 2000
- Adventures of Colonel Daffodil by Major General Sir Roy Redgrave KBE MC, published by Pen & Sword, London 2007

Military offices
Preceded by Sir David Scott-Barrett	Commandant, British Sector in Berlin; 1975–1978	Succeeded by Sir Robert Richardson
Preceded by Sir John Archer	Commander of British Forces in Hong Kong; 1978–1980	Succeeded by Sir John Chapple
