= David Peel Yates =

British Army general (1911–1978)

Lieutenant-General Sir David Peel Yates KCB CVO DSO* OBE DL JP
- Born: 10 July 1911; Gillingham, Kent, England
- Died: 8 October 1978 (aged 67); Denver, Colorado, United States
- Military career
- Allegiance: United Kingdom
- Branch: British Army
- Service years: 1931–1969
- Rank: Lieutenant-General
- Service number: 52733
- Unit: South Wales Borderers
- Commands: Southern Command; Eastern Command; British Forces in Berlin; 27th Infantry Brigade; 1st Battalion, South Wales Borderers; 6th Battalion, Lincolnshire Regiment
- Conflicts: North West Frontier; Second World War
- Awards: Knight Commander of the Order of the Bath; Commander of the Royal Victorian Order; Distinguished Service Order; Officer of the Order of the British Empire

Lieutenant-General Sir David Peel Yates, KCB, CVO, DSO*, OBE, DL, JP (10 July 1911 – 8 October 1978) was a senior British Army officer who served in the Second World War and reached high office during the 1960s.

== Early life and education ==
Peel Yates was the son of Hubert Peel Yates and the brother of Captain Colin Peel Yates of the Royal Navy. He was educated at Haileybury College and the Royal Military College, Sandhurst.

== Military career ==
Yates was commissioned as a second lieutenant into the South Wales Borderers, a line infantry regiment of the British Army, in which his father had served, in 1931. He was deployed on Waziristan operations on the North West Frontier of India in 1937 before becoming adjutant of the 1st Battalion, Monmouthshire Regiment, a Territorial Army unit, in 1939.

Yates served in the Second World War, initially as brigade major of the 113th Infantry Brigade in 1940. He then went to the Staff College, Camberley, before becoming brigade major of the 204th Independent Infantry Brigade (Home) in 1941. He served as a general staff officer with the 4th Division and then at First Army Headquarters. He was involved in the fall of Tunis in May 1943. He was appointed commanding officer of the 6th Battalion, Lincolnshire Regiment, which was deployed to the Italian Front in 1943 before he returned to the 4th Division later that year. He was a brigadier on the General Staff of General Sir Harold Alexander at Allied Force Headquarters in Italy in 1945.

After the war, Peel Yates became an instructor at the Joint Services Staff College in 1946 and then assistant adjutant and quartermaster general at the War Office in 1949. He was an instructor at the NATO (North Atlantic Treaty Organisation) Defence College in Paris between 1951 and 1953 when he became commanding officer of the 1st Battalion, South Wales Borderers. He was appointed commander of the 27th Infantry Brigade in Hong Kong in 1955 and Assistant Commandant at the Staff College, Camberley in 1957. He then became chief of staff for Eastern Command in 1960 and Commandant of the British Sector in Berlin in 1962. During the visit of John F. Kennedy to West Berlin in June 1963, Yates explained to the U.S. president the Cold War topography of the city, marked by the Berlin Wall, while both were standing on an observation platform facing the Brandenburg Gate. He was General Officer Commanding-in-Chief (GOC-in-C) for Eastern Command from 1966 to 1968, when he became GOC-in-C for Southern Command. He retired in 1969.

== Family ==
In 1947, Yates married Christine Hilary Williams, daughter of Horatio Stanley Williams; they had a son and a daughter.

Military offices
Preceded by Claude Dunbar	Commandant, British Sector in Berlin; 1962–1966	Succeeded by Sir John Nelson
Preceded by Sir George Cole	GOC-in-C Eastern Command; 1966–1968	Post disbanded
Preceded by Sir John Mogg	GOC-in-C Southern Command; 1968–1969	Succeeded by Sir Michael Carver
Honorary titles
Preceded by Francis Matthews	Colonel of the South Wales Borderers; 1961–1969	Post disbanded, became Royal Regiment of Wales
New post	Colonel of the Royal Regiment of Wales; 1969–1977	Succeeded by Alexander Harrod
