= Patrick Brooking =

British Army general

Major-General Patrick Brooking CB CMG MBE DL
- Born: 4 April 1937
- Died: 22 January 2014 (aged 76)
- Military career
- Allegiance: United Kingdom
- Branch: British Army
- Service years: 1956–1990
- Rank: Major-General
- Service number: 448524
- Commands: 5th Royal Inniskilling Dragoon Guards; 33rd Armoured Brigade; British Forces in Berlin
- Awards: Companion of the Order of the Bath; Companion of the Order of St Michael and St George; Member of the Order of the British Empire

Major-General Patrick Guy Brooking CB CMG MBE DL (4 April 1937 – 22 January 2014) was a British Army officer who served as commandant of the British Sector in Berlin.

== Early life ==
Brooking was born on 4 April 1937. He was educated at Charterhouse School, a public boys boarding school.

== Military career ==
As part of National Service, Brooking was commissioned into the Royal Armoured Corps as a second lieutenant on 23 June 1956. On 4 April 1958, he transferred to the 5th Royal Inniskilling Dragoon Guards and was promoted to lieutenant. On 4 April 1964, he was promoted to captain. Having attended the Staff College, Camberley, he was promoted to major on 31 December 1969.

He served with 39th Brigade in Belfast from 1974 to 1975 when he became commanding officer of his regiment. He became an instructor at the Staff College, Camberley, in 1978, Chief of Staff of 4th Armoured Division in 1979 and commander of 33rd Armoured Brigade in 1982. He was appointed assistant chief of staff for UK Land Forces in 1984 and commandant of the British Sector in Berlin in 1985. Finally he became director-general of Army Manning & Recruiting in 1989.

He retired in 1990.

== Later life ==
In retirement, Brooking became chairman of the British-German Association, a not-for-profit organisation devoted to forging links between the two countries. He also became deputy lieutenant of Wiltshire, and served as Master of the Worshipful Company of Broderers from 2003 to 2004.

Brooking died on 22 January 2014 at the age of 76.

== Personal life ==
In 1964 he married Pamala Mary Walford: they went on to have one son and one daughter.

He was known as the 'Singing General' for his involvement in choral music. While stationed in Germany, he sang with the Berlin Philharmonic Choir.

== Honours and decorations ==
On 25 March 1975, he was appointed Member of the Order of the British Empire (MBE) 'in recognition of distinguished services in Northern Ireland during the period 1 August 1974 to 31 October 1974'. In the 1988 Queen's Birthday Honours, he was appointed Companion of the Order of the Bath (CB). In the 1997 New Year Honours, he was appointed Companion of the Order of St Michael and St George (CMG) 'for services to UK-German relations in Berlin'.

He was appointed Honorary Colonel of the 5th Royal Inniskilling Dragoon Guards on 22 March 1991, transferring on 1 August 1992 following the amalgamation of the 5th Royal Inniskilling Dragoon Guards with the 4th/7th Royal Dragoon Guards to become the first Honorary Colonel of the resultant Royal Dragoon Guards. On 3 February 1997, he became deputy lieutenant (DL) of the County of Wiltshire.

Military offices
Preceded by Bernard Gordon Lennox	Commandant, British Sector in Berlin; 1985–1989	Succeeded by Sir Robert Corbett
