= Eric Nares =

British Army general (1892–1947)

Major-General Eric Nares CB CBE MC*
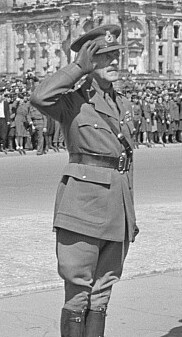
- Nares in 1946
- Born: Eric Paytherus Nares; 9 July 1892
- Died: 18 June 1947 (aged 54); London, England
- Military career
- Allegiance: United Kingdom
- Branch: British Army
- Service years: 1911–1947
- Rank: Major-General
- Service number: 4593
- Unit: Cheshire Regiment
- Commands: British Forces in Berlin (1945–1947); North Africa District (1943–1944); Lines of Communications, Allied Force Headquarters (1943); 2nd Battalion, Cheshire Regiment (1936)
- Conflicts: First World War; Arab revolt in Palestine; Second World War
- Awards: Companion of the Order of the Bath; Commander of the Order of the British Empire; Military Cross & Bar; Mentioned in Despatches (3); Commander of the Legion of Merit (United States)

Major-General Eric Paytherus Nares, CB, CBE, MC & Bar (9 July 1892 – 18 June 1947) was a senior officer of the British Army.

== Military career ==
Born the youngest son of Ramsey Nares and educated at Marlborough College and the Royal Military College, Sandhurst, Eric Nares was commissioned into the Cheshire Regiment on 20 September 1911. Among his fellow graduates were two future generals, Kenneth Anderson and Montagu Stopford.

Nares served in the First World War, during which he was wounded twice, three times mentioned in despatches and was awarded the Military Cross (MC) with a Bar. The citation for his MC reads:

For conspicuous gallantry and devotion to duty. When nearly all the officers of his battalion had become casualties he rendered invaluable service to his Commanding Officer in planning the assembly arrangements of his battalion, which subsequently took and held all its objectives in spite of having lost 60 per cent of its men. It was due to the example set by these two officers that the ground was maintained against many determined hostile counter-attacks, and, after Major Nares had successfully established communication with other units on either flank, he was very severely wounded whilst returning to report to his Commanding Officer. His gallantry and devotion to duty deserved the highest praise.

The citation for the Bar to his MC reads:

For conspicuous gallantry and devotion to duty in commanding his battalion with great ability. He organised several attacks and counter-attacks, and maintained his position until practically surrounded by large forces of the enemy. When compelled to retire, he kept the battalion well in hand and showed sound judgment in the selection of new positions.

After the war, Nares served with the West African Frontier Force until 1924. He attended, from 1927 to 1928, the Staff College, Camberley, and later became a staff captain in China in 1931 and was made assistant adjutant and quartermaster general for the 8th Division in Palestine, during the Arab revolt, in 1936.

Nares served in the Middle East, North Africa and Central Mediterranean (including Italy) during the Second World War. He was appointed a Commander of the Order of the British Empire in 1941, awarded the Legion of Merit (Degree of Commander) from the United States in 1946 for his services in Italy and, in the 1947 New Year Honours, was appointed a Companion of the Order of the Bath. His last post was Commandant of the British Sector in Berlin after the war.

Nares died in London on 18 June 1947 at Queen Alexandra's Military Hospital. He was cremated after a service at St Thomas-on-the-Bourne, Farnham, Surrey. A memorial tablet for him was dedicated to him by his fellow officers in the sanctuary of the regimental chapel in Chester Cathedral.

== Family ==
Nares was married to Jeanne Hubertine from the Netherlands, but she died shortly after contracting sandfly fever after she accompanied Nares to Palestine.

== Bibliography ==
- Smart, Nick (2005). Biographical Dictionary of British Generals of the Second World War. Barnesley: Pen & Sword. ISBN 1844150496.

Military offices
Preceded by Lewis Lyne	Commandant, British Sector in Berlin; 1945–1947	Succeeded by Sir Otway Herbert
