= Iain Mackay-Dick =

British Army general

Major General Sir Iain Mackay-Dick KCVO MBE
- Born: 24 August 1945 (age 81)
- Military career
- Allegiance: United Kingdom
- Branch: British Army
- Service years: 1965–1997
- Rank: Major General
- Commands: London District; Household Division; 1st Armoured Division
- Conflicts: Operation Banner; Falklands War
- Awards: Knight Commander of the Royal Victorian Order; Member of the Order of the British Empire

Major General Sir Iain Charles Mackay-Dick, KCVO, MBE (born 24 August 1945) Is a retired British Army officer. He was the Major-General commanding the Household Division and General Officer Commanding London District from 1994 to 1997.

== Military career ==
Educated at St Edmund's School, Hindhead, then at Sherborne School and the Royal Military Academy Sandhurst, Mackay-Dick was commissioned into the Scots Guards in 1965. He was appointed a Member of the Order of the British Empire for his service in Northern Ireland in 1981. He took part in the Falklands War, leading the landing of 600 Scots Guards and others at Fitzroy on East Falkland.

In 1986 Mackay-Dick was appointed commandant of the Junior Division Staff College at Warminster and in 1989 he became commander of the 11th Armoured Brigade. He was made Deputy Military Secretary at the Ministry of Defence in 1991 and General Officer Commanding 1st Armoured Division in 1992. He went on to be Commander of British Forces in the Falkland Islands in 1993 and Major-General Commanding the Household Division and General Officer Commanding London District in 1994. He retired in 1997.

In retirement Mackay-Dick became Clerk to the Trustees and Chief Executive of Morden College.

== Family ==
Mackay-Dick married Carolynn Hilary Holmes in 1971. They have three daughters.

Military offices
Preceded by Rupert Smith	General Officer Commanding 1st Armoured Division; 1992–1993	Succeeded by Anthony Denison-Smith
Preceded by Sir Robert Corbett	General Officer Commanding London District; 1994–1997	Succeeded by Sir Evelyn Webb-Carter
