= Roland Guy =

British Army general (1928-2005)

General Sir Roland Guy GCB CBE DSO
- Born: 25 June 1928; Srinagar, Kashmir
- Died: 13 December 2005 (aged 77)
- Military career
- Allegiance: United Kingdom
- Branch: British Army
- Service years: 1948–1986
- Rank: General
- Service number: 397265
- Unit: King's Royal Rifle Corps
- Commands: Adjutant-General to the Forces; Military Secretary; 24 Airportable Brigade; 1st Battalion, Royal Green Jackets
- Conflicts: Mau Mau Uprising; Indonesia–Malaysia confrontation Operation Banner
- Awards: Knight Grand Cross of the Order of the Bath; Commander of the Order of the British Empire; Companion of the Distinguished Service Order

General Sir Roland Kelvin Guy, GCB, CBE, DSO (25 June 1928 – 13 December 2005) was a senior British Army officer who was Adjutant-General to the Forces.

== Military career ==
Born in Srinagar, Kashmir, and educated at Wellington College and at the Royal Military Academy, Sandhurst, Roland Guy was commissioned into the Kings Royal Rifle Corps (the 60th) in 1948. He served as an adjutant with the Kenya Regiment during the Mau Mau Uprising. He was adjutant of the 2nd Green Jackets (KRRC) during the confrontation with Indonesia. He became commanding officer of the 1st Battalion The Royal Green Jackets in 1969. He was appointed a Companion of the Distinguished Service Order for service in Northern Ireland in 1972. In 1972 he became Commander of 24 Airportable Brigade.

He was Chief of Staff, HQ BAOR from 1978 to 1980 when he became Military Secretary. He was Adjutant-General to the Forces from 1984 to 1986.

He was also appointed ADC General to the Queen in 1984.

Guy was appointed a Member of the Order of the British Empire in 1955, a Commander of the Order of the British Empire in 1978, a Knight Commander of the Order of the Bath in 1981, and a Knight Grand Cross of the Order of the Bath in 1987.

== Retirement ==
He was a Governor of the Royal Hospital Chelsea from 1987 to 1993, and Chairman of the Army Benevolent Fund also from 1987 to 1993.

== Family ==
In 1957 he married Deirdre Graves-Morris and they went on to have two daughters.

Military offices
Preceded by Sir Robin Carnegie	Military Secretary; 1980–1983	Succeeded by Sir David Mostyn
Preceded by Sir George Cooper	Adjutant General; 1984–1986	Succeeded by Sir David Mostyn
Honorary titles
Preceded by Sir Robert Ford	Governor, Royal Hospital Chelsea; 1987–1993	Succeeded by Sir Brian Kenny
