= Claude Dunbar =

British Army general

Major-General Claude Dunbar CB CBE DSO
- Born: 1909
- Died: 1971 (aged 61 or 62)
- Military career
- Allegiance: United Kingdom
- Branch: British Army
- Service years: 1929−1963
- Rank: Major-General
- Service number: 41098
- Unit: Scots Guards
- Commands: 1st Battalion, Scots Guards; 3rd Battalion, Scots Guards; 2nd Guards Brigade; 4th Guards Brigade; 42nd Infantry Division; British Forces in Berlin
- Conflicts: World War II
- Awards: Companion of the Order of the Bath; Commander of the Order of the British Empire; Distinguished Service Order

Major-General Claude Ian Hurley Dunbar CB CBE DSO (1909–1971) was Commandant of the British Sector in Berlin.

== Military career ==
Dunbar was commissioned into the Scots Guards in 1929.

He served in World War II becoming commanding officer of 1st Bn Scots Guards in 1943 and commanding officer of 3rd Bn Scots Guards in 1943.

After the War he reverted to being commanding officer of 1 Bn Scots Guards and then became assistant quartermaster general for London District in 1948. He was made commander of 2nd Guards Brigade in 1949 and commander of 4th Guards Brigade in 1950.

He went on to command the Scots Guards Regiment and Regimental District in 1952 and became brigadier in charge of administration at Eastern Command in 1954. He was appointed general officer commanding 42nd (Lancashire) Division in 1959 and general officer commanding North West District in 1960. Finally he became Commandant of the British Sector in Berlin in 1962; he retired in 1963.

== Family ==
He was married to Susan.

Military offices
Preceded by Thomas Scott	GOC 42nd (Lancashire) Division; 1959−1962	Succeeded by George Lea
Preceded by Sir Rohan Delacombe	Commandant, British Sector in Berlin; May 1962–December 1962	Succeeded by Sir David Yates
