= List of commandants of Berlin Sectors =

This article lists the military commandants of divided Berlin between 1945 and 1994. Following the end of World War II in Europe, the Allies divided Berlin into distinct, occupied sectors, each had its own military governor, often referred to as commandant. This practice ended officially with the German reunification in 1990, but the several military commanders were in place until as late as 1994, when the respective occupying/protective forces were withdrawn, according to the Treaty on the Final Settlement with Respect to Germany.

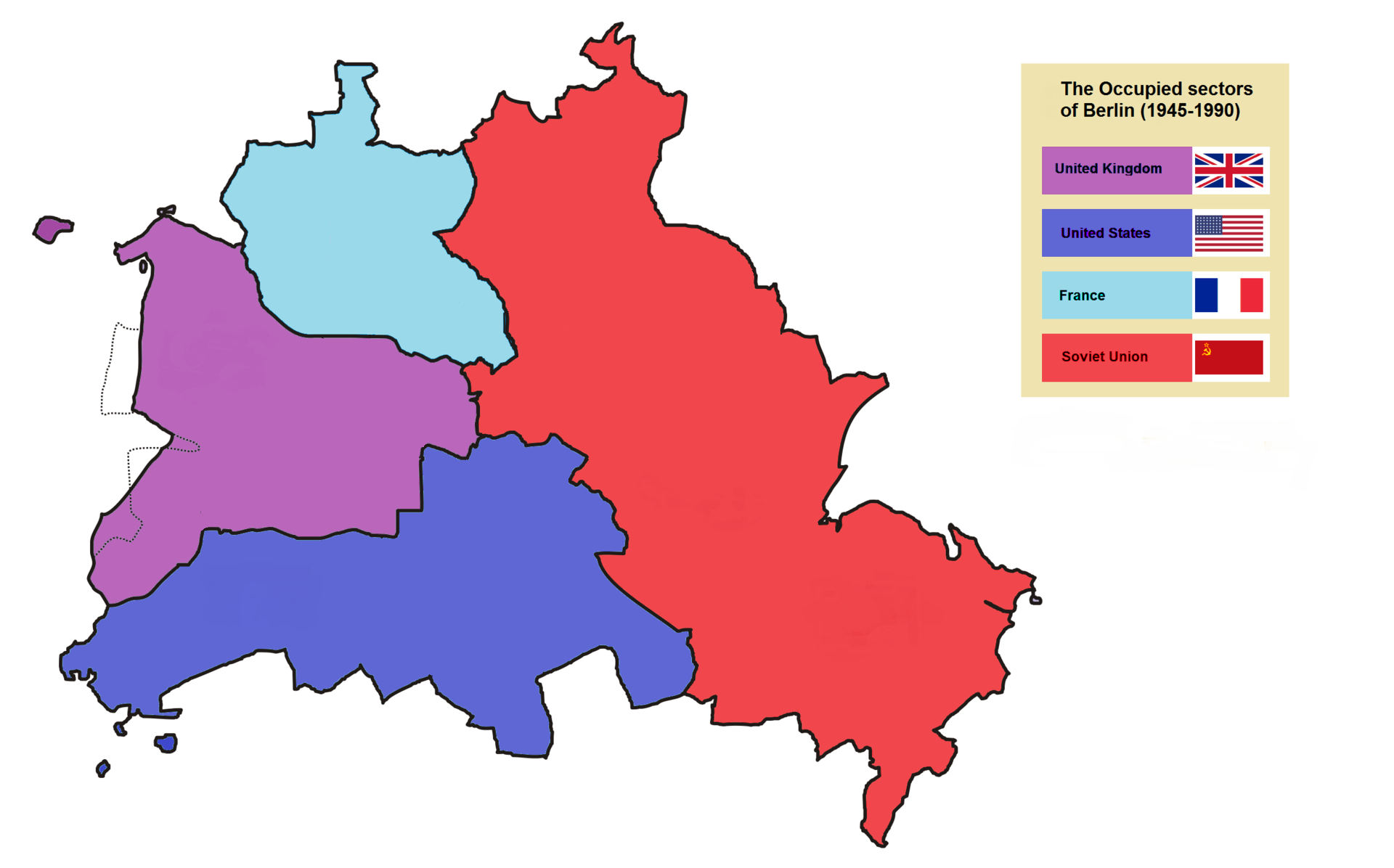
The occupied sectors of Berlin.

== Commandants ==
=== American sector ===
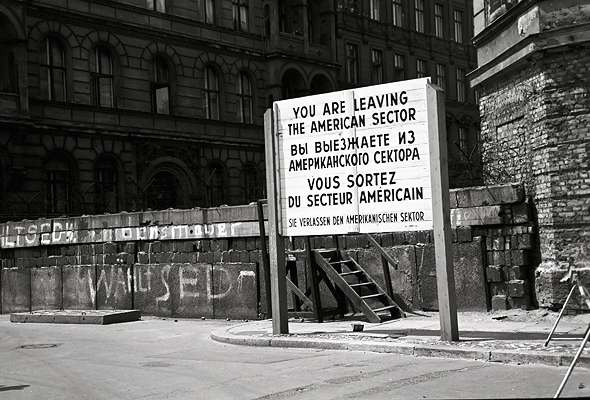
Road sign delimiting the American sector of Berlin, 1965.

Commandant	In Office
MG Floyd L. Parks	4 July 1945 – 2 September 1945
MG James M. Gavin	3 September 1945 – 10 October 1945
MG Ray W. Barker	11 October 1945 – 1 May 1946
MG Frank A. Keating	1 May 1946 – 13 May 1947
MG Cornelius E. Ryan	14 May 1947 – 23 September 1947
MG William Hesketh	24 September 1947 – 30 November 1947
BG Frank L. Howley	1 December 1947 – 31 August 1949
MG Maxwell D. Taylor	31 August 1949 – 31 January 1951
MG Lemuel Mathewson	1 February 1951 – 2 January 1953
MG Thomas S. Timberman	3 January 1953 – 4 August 1954
MG George B. Honnen	5 August 1954 – 9 September 1955
MG Charles L. Dasher	10 September 1955 – 3 June 1957
MG Barksdale Hamlett	4 June 1957 – 15 December 1959
MG Ralph Osborne	20 December 1959 – 3 May 1961
MG Albert Watson II	4 May 1961 – 2 January 1963
MG James H. Polk	2 January 1963 – 31 August 1964
MG John F. Franklin Jr.	1 September 1964 – 3 June 1967
MG Robert G. Fergusson	3 June 1967 – 28 February 1970
MG George M. Seignious	28 February 1970 – 12 May 1971
MG William W. Cobb	12 May 1971 – 10 June 1974
MG Sam S. Walker	10 June 1974 – 11 August 1975
MG Joseph C. McDonough	11 August 1975 – 7 June 1978
MG Calvert P. Benedict	7 June 1978 – 5 July 1981
MG James G. Boatner	5 July 1981 – 27 June 1984
MG John H. Mitchell	27 June 1984 – 1 June 1988
MG Raymond E. Haddock	1 June 1988 – 2 October 1990

=== British sector ===
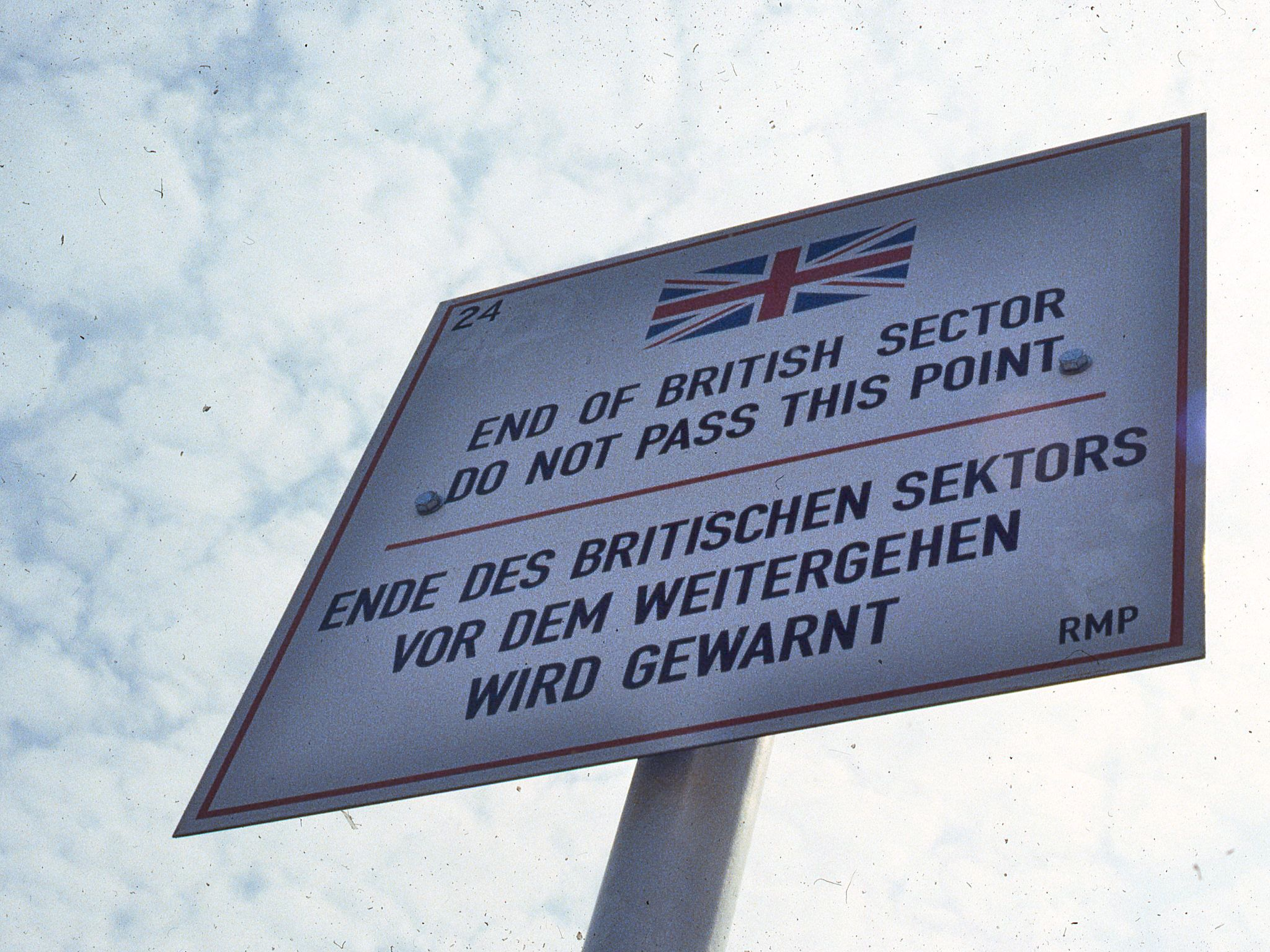
Road sign delimiting the British sector of Berlin, 1984.

Commandant	In Office
Maj Gen Lewis Lyne	5 July 1945 – 30 August 1945
Maj Gen Eric Nares	30 August 1945 – 13 June 1947
Lt Gen Otway Herbert	13 June 1947 – 23 January 1949
Gen Geoffrey Bourne	23 January 1949 – 24 October 1951
Lt Gen Charles Coleman	24 October 1951 – 13 March 1954
Lt Gen William Oliver	13 March 1954 – 30 April 1955
Maj Gen Robert Cottrell-Hill	1 May 1955 – 6 February 1956
Maj Gen Francis Rome	26 March 1956 – 20 March 1959
Maj Gen Rohan Delacombe	23 March 1959 – 3 May 1962
Maj Gen Claude Dunbar	May 1962 – December 1962
Lt Gen David Peel Yates	December 1962 – January 1966
Maj Gen John Nelson	February 1966 – February 1968
Maj Gen James Bowes-Lyon	March 1968 – November 1970
Maj Gen Lord Cathcart	November 1970 – July 1973
Lt Gen David Scott-Barrett	August 1973 – November 1975
Maj Gen Roy Redgrave	November 1975 – January 1978
Lt Gen Robert Richardson	January 1978 – September 1980
Gen David Mostyn	September 1980 – October 1983
Maj Gen Bernard Gordon Lennox	October 1983 – December 1985
Maj Gen Patrick Brooking	December 1985 – January 1989
Maj Gen Robert Corbett	1989 – 2 October 1990

=== French sector ===
Commandant	In Office
Geoffroi du Bois de Beauchesne	11 July 1945 – 12 March 1946
Charles Lançon	12 March 1946 – 4 October 1946
Jean Ganeval	4 October 1946 – 5 October 1950
Pierre Carolet	1 October 1950 – 31 December 1952
Pierre Manceaux-Démiau	1 January 1953 – 31 December 1954
Amédée J.B. Gèze	1 January 1955 – 30 September 1958
Jean Lacomme	1 October 1958 – 25 February 1962
Edouard K. Toulouse	1962 – 1964
François Binoche	1964 – 1967
Bertrand Huchet de Quénétain	1967 – 1970
Maurice Routier	1970 – 1973
Camille Metzler	1973 – 1975
Jacques Mangin	1975 – 1977
Bernard d'Astorg	1977 – 1980
Jean P. Liron	1980 – 1984
Olivier Le Taillendier de Gabory	1984 – 1985
Paul Cavarrot	1985 – 1987
François Cann	1987 – 2 October 1990

=== Soviet sector ===
Commandant	In Office
Soviet Commandants
Nikolai Berzarin	28 April 1945 – 16 June 1945
Alexander Gorbatov	17 June 1945 – 19 November 1945
Dmitry Smirnov	19 November 1945 – 1 April 1946
Aleksandr Kotikov	1 April 1946 – 7 June 1950
Sergey Dengin	7 June 1950 – 28 May 1953
Pyotr Dibrova	28 May 1953 – 23 June 1956
Andrey Chamov	28 June 1956 – 26 February 1958
Matvei Zakharov	26 February 1958 – 9 May 1961
Andrey Soloviev	9 May 1961 – 22 August 1962
East German Commandants
Helmut Poppe	22 August 1962 – 31 May 1971
Arthur Kunath	1 June 1971 – 31 August 1978
Karl-Heinz Drews	1 September 1978 – 31 December 1989
Wolfgang Dombrowski	1 January 1990 – 30 September 1990
Detlef Wendorf	30 September 1990 – 2 October 1990

== See also ==
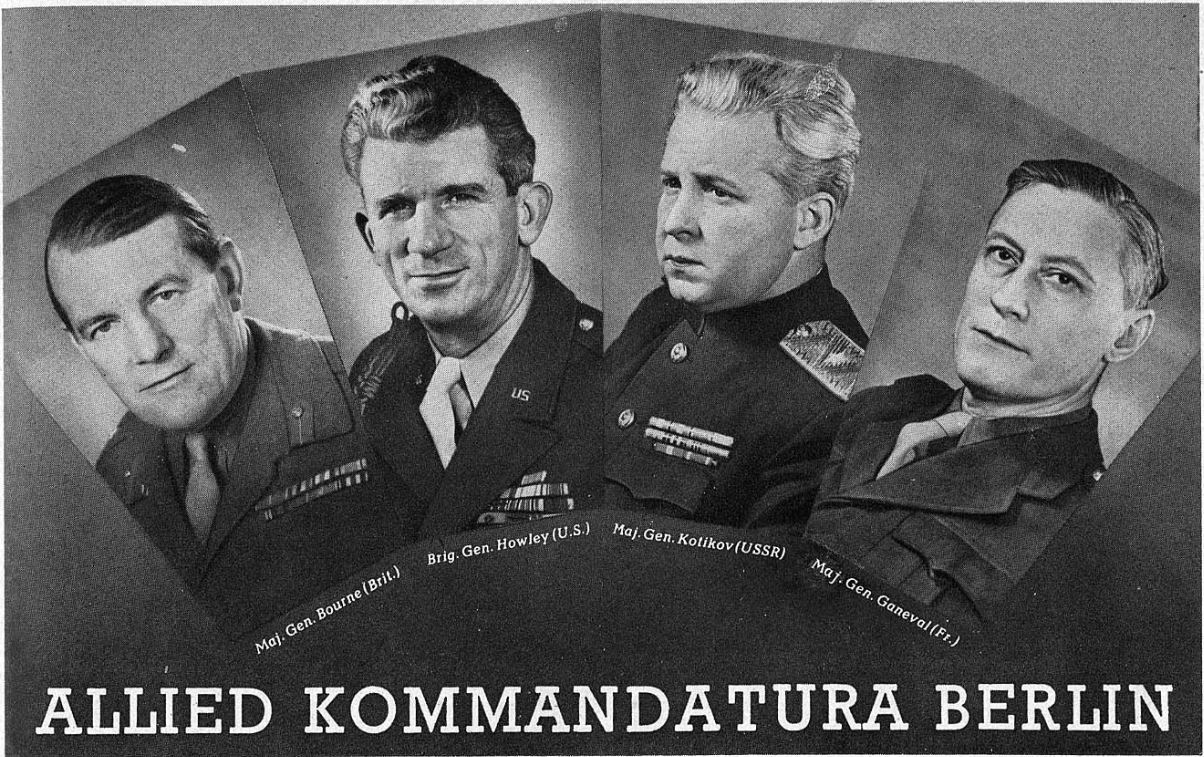
The four Allied commandants of Berlin, 1949

- Cold War
- Allied-occupied Germany
- Allied Kommandatura
- Berlin Wall
- West Berlin / East Berlin
- Berlin border crossings
- United States Army Berlin (for the American forces in the city)
  - Berlin Brigade
- Berlin Operations Base
- Berlin Infantry Brigade (for the British forces in the city)
- French Forces in Berlin
- 6th Separate Guards Motor Rifle Brigade (for the Soviet forces in the city)
