= Robert Corbett (British Army officer) =

British Army general

Major General Sir Robert Corbett KCVO CB
- Born: 16 May 1940 (age 86)
- Military career
- Allegiance: United Kingdom
- Branch: British Army
- Service years: 1959–1994
- Rank: Major General
- Commands: London District; British Forces in Berlin; 5th Airborne Brigade; 1st Battalion Irish Guards
- Awards: Knight Commander of the Royal Victorian Order; Companion of the Order of the Bath

Major General Sir Robert John Swan Corbett, KCVO, CB (born 16 May 1940) is a retired senior British Army officer who served as the last Commandant of the British Sector in Berlin from 1989 to 1990.

== Military career ==
Educated at Woodcote House School and Shrewsbury School, Corbett was commissioned into the Irish Guards in 1959. He became commanding officer of the 1st Battalion Irish Guards in 1981. He served as chief of staff to British Forces in the Falkland Islands in 1984 and commander of the 5th Airborne Brigade in 1985. He went on to be Director of Defence Programmes at the Ministry of Defence in 1987 and the last Commandant of the British Sector in Berlin prior to the German reunification in 1990. He was appointed Major-General commanding the Household Division and General Officer Commanding London District in 1991. He retired in 1994.

In retirement Corbett became Secretary of the Dulverton Trust, a national charity with priorities in youth and education.

== Family ==
Corbett married Susan Margaret Anne O'Cock in 1966. They have three sons.

Military offices
Preceded by Patrick Brooking	Commandant, British Sector in Berlin; 1989–1990	Post disbanded
Preceded by Sir Simon Cooper	GOC London District; 1991–1994	Succeeded by Sir Iain Mackay-Dick
