= Bernard Gordon Lennox =

British Army general

Major-General Bernard Gordon Lennox CB MBE
- Born: 19 September 1932; Chelsea, London
- Died: 27 December 2017 (aged 85)
- Military career
- Allegiance: United Kingdom
- Branch: British Army
- Service years: 1953–1987
- Rank: Major-General
- Service number: 426886
- Unit: Grenadier Guards
- Commands: 1st Battalion, Grenadier Guards; British Forces in Berlin
- Awards: Companion of the Order of the Bath; Member of the Order of the British Empire

Major-General Bernard Charles Gordon Lennox, CB, MBE (19 September 1932 – 27 December 2017) was a senior British Army officer. He served as Commandant of the British Sector in Berlin from October 1983 to December 1985.

== Military career ==
Gordon Lennox was born at 17 Cheyne Court, Chelsea, London, the eldest son of Lieutenant General Sir George Gordon Lennox and Nancy Brenda Darell. His grandfathers were Lord Bernard Gordon-Lennox (son of the 7th Duke of Richmond) and Sir Lionel Darell, 6th Baronet.

He served as Page of Honour to King George VI. He was educated at Eton College. He graduated from the Royal Military Academy Sandhurst, where he won the Sword of Honour, and was commissioned into the Grenadier Guards in 1953.

He was appointed commanding officer of 1st Bn Grenadier Guards in 1974. He went on to be on the Army Directing Staff at the RAF Staff College in 1976, Commander of 20th Armoured Brigade in 1978 and chief of staff for South East District in 1981. He was promoted to major general in 1983 and appointed GOC (general officer commanding) of the British Sector in Berlin. Finally he became the senior army member at the Royal College of Defence Studies in 1986. He retired from the Army in 1988.

== Personal life ==
In 1958, he married Sally-Rose Warner. They had three sons:

- Edward Charles (born 30 January 1961), Page of Honour to Queen Elizabeth II
- Angus Charles (born 4 February 1964)
- Charles Bernard (born 18 June 1970)

He lived at Eversley in Hampshire. He died in 2017 from the effects of dementia, at the age of 85.

Court offices
Preceded by None due to the War	Page of Honour; 1946 – 1949	Succeeded by Henry Charles Seymour
Military offices
Preceded by Sir David Mostyn	Commandant, British Sector in Berlin; 1983–1985	Succeeded by Patrick Brooking
