= Otway Herbert =

British Army Lieutenant General (1901-1984)

Lieutenant-General Sir Otway Herbert KBE CB DSO*
- Born: 19 November 1901
- Died: 4 April 1984 (aged 82); Glyndŵr, Clwyd, Wales
- Military career
- Allegiance: United Kingdom
- Branch: British Army
- Service years: 1921–1960
- Rank: Lieutenant-General
- Service number: 18477
- Unit: Royal Artillery
- Commands: Western Command (1957–1960); West Africa Command (1953–1956); 44th (Home Counties) Infantry Division (1952–1953); British Forces in Berlin (1947–1949); 132nd (Welsh) Field Regiment, Royal Artillery (1942–1943); 181st Field Regiment, Royal Artillery (1942); 6th Battalion, King's Shropshire Light Infantry (1942)
- Conflicts: Second World War
- Awards: Knight Commander of the Order of the British Empire; Companion of the Order of the Bath; Distinguished Service Order & Bar; Mentioned in Despatches (3); Officer of the Legion of Merit (United States); Commander of the Order of Orange-Nassau (Netherlands); Commander of the Order of Leopold II (Belgium)

Lieutenant-General Sir Edwin Otway Herbert, KBE, CB, DSO & Bar (19 November 1901 – 4 April 1984) was a senior British Army officer who served during the Second World War and achieved high command in the 1950s.

== Military career ==
Herbert attended the Royal Military College, Sandhurst, and was commissioned as a second lieutenant into the British Army's Royal Artillery on 22 December 1921. He served in Egypt between 1928 and 1935. Returning to the United Kingdom, he became brigade major for the 27th (Home Counties) Anti-Aircraft Group in 1935.

Herbert served in the Second World War, initially as deputy assistant adjutant-general for 27 Anti-Aircraft Group, then deployed to France and Belgium with the British Expeditionary Force. On 1 March 1942 he took over as commanding officer of the 6th Battalion, King's Shropshire Light Infantry with the task of converting it into the 181st Field Regiment, Royal Artillery. In August 1942 he joined the 132nd (Welsh) Field Regiment, Royal Artillery, which formed part of the 78th "Battleaxe" Infantry Division and commanded it in the Tunisian campaign. In 1943 he joined the 21st Army Group in England and later in Northwest Europe.

After the war Herbert became Commander Royal Artillery for 5th Division, moving on to be Commandant of the British Sector in Berlin in 1947. He became director territorial army and cadets at the War Office in 1949 and general officer commanding 44th (Home Counties) Infantry Division in 1952. He was general officer commanding-in-chief (GOC-in-C) West Africa Command from 1953, earning the distinction of being the last soldier to hold this command. He was GOC-in-C Western Command from 1957 and retired from the British Army in 1960. He was also colonel commandant of the Royal Artillery from 1956 to 1966.

Herbert lived at Brynsiencyn in Anglesey.

== Family ==
In 1925 Herbert married Muriel Irlam Barlow and together they went on to have a daughter.

== Bibliography ==
- Don Neal, Guns and Bugles: The Story of the 6th Bn KSLI – 181st Field Regiment RA 1940–1946, Studley: Brewin, 2001, ISBN 1-85858-192-3.

Military offices
Preceded by Eric Nares	Commandant, British Sector in Berlin; 1947–1949	Succeeded by Lord Bourne
Preceded by Brian Kimmins	GOC 44th (Home Counties) Division; 1952–1953	Succeeded by Robert King
Preceded by Sir Lashmer Whistler	GOC West Africa Command; 1953–1956	Post disbanded
Preceded by Sir Lashmer Whistler	GOC-in-C Western Command; 1957–1960	Succeeded by Sir William Stirling
