= Karl-Heinz Drews =

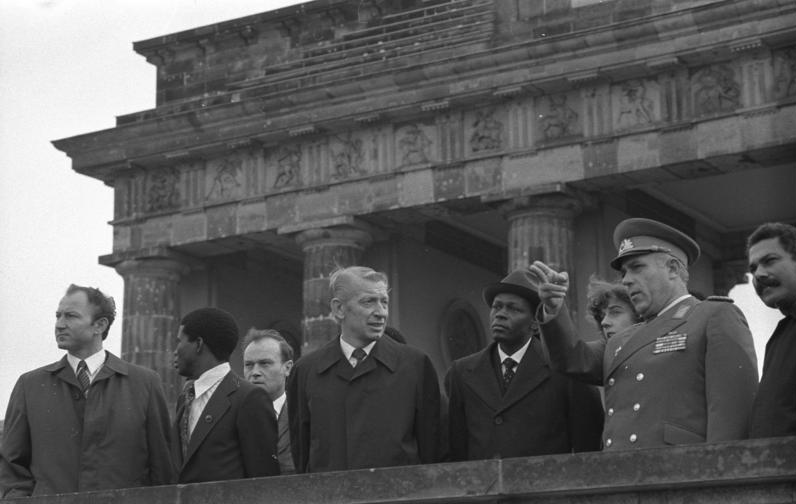
Drews (right) with a delegation at the Brandenburg Gate, 1981.

Karl-Heinz Drews (born on December 22, 1929) is a former lieutenant general of the National People's Army and City Commandant of East Berlin.

== Life ==
Drews was born in Stettin on December 22, 1929, the son of a saddler. After attending elementary and secondary school, he served as a motorcycle messenger in the Volkssturm and the Wehrmacht from 1944 to 1945.

After the war, from 1945 to 1948, he worked as a dairy driver and farm laborer in the Osterburg district. In 1948, he joined the Socialist Unity Party of Germany and the Volkspolizei as a candidate. After attending political and officer training schools, he became a political officer in the Kasernierte Volkspolizei, and from 1956 in the National People's Army (NVA) . From 1967 to 1967, Drews held, among other positions, the post of head of the political department of the 4th Motorized Rifle Division. From 1967 to 1975, he was head of the political administration of Military District V in Neubrandenburg. During this time, he also attended the General Staff Academy of the USSR and was promoted to major general in 1969 in this capacity.

From 1976 to 1978, he was military attaché at the GDR embassy in the Soviet Union, and from 1 September 1978 – 31 December 1989, he succeeded Lieutenant General Artur Kunath as city commandant of East Berlin. From 1981 to 1990, he also served as a city councilor in East Berlin. In 1981, he was promoted to lieutenant general and retired in December 1989 after reaching the age of 60.

== Awards ==
- Patriotic Order of Merit in Bronze (1970)
- Combat Order "For Services to the People and Fatherland" (1979)
- Scharnhorst Order (1984)
- Patriotic Order of Merit in Silver (1986)
