= Robert Richardson (British Army officer) =

British Army general (1929–2014)

Lieutenant-General Sir Robert Richardson KCB CVO CBE
- Born: 2 March 1929; Leith, Edinburgh, Scotland
- Died: 21 November 2014 (aged 85)
- Military career
- Allegiance: United Kingdom
- Branch: British Army
- Service years: 1949−1995
- Rank: Lieutenant-General
- Service number: 408020
- Unit: Royal Scots
- Commands: 1st Battalion, Royal Scots; 39th Infantry Brigade; British Forces in Berlin; Northern Ireland
- Conflicts: Korean War; Aden Emergency; The Troubles
- Awards: Knight Commander of the Order of the Bath; Commander of the Order of the British Empire; Commander of the Royal Victorian Order; Mention in Despatches

Lieutenant-General Sir Robert Francis Richardson KCB CVO CBE (2 March 1929 – 21 November 2014) was a British Army officer. Among other posts, he commanded a battalion and a brigade during the Troubles before becoming General Officer Commanding in Northern Ireland from 1982 to 1985.

== Regimental career ==
He was educated at George Heriot's School, Edinburgh, and then at the Royal Military Academy Sandhurst. He was commissioned into the Royal Scots as a second lieutenant on 16 December 1949, after leaving Sandhurst, and posted to the 1st Battalion. He was promoted to lieutenant on 16 December 1951, and briefly saw service at the end of the Korean War. He then travelled with the battalion to the Middle East, where he was promoted to captain on 16 December 1955. After service with the British Army of the Rhine, he studied at the Defence Services Staff College in India from 1960-1961.

He was then posted to staff duties at the Ministry of Defence until 1964, when he attended the Joint Services Staff College. Whilst at the Ministry of Defence, he was promoted to major on 16 December 1962. He was appointed a Member of the Order of the British Empire (MBE) in the 1965 New Year Honours.

He was brigade major of the Aden Brigade during the Aden Emergency in 1967, where he was Mentioned in Despatches. He then returned to staff duties at the Ministry of Defence, receiving his promotion to lieutenant-colonel on 31 December 1968, and was appointed as commanding officer of the 1st Battalion, Royal Scots in 1969, a post he held until 1971. During his time in command, the battalion made a number of short tours to Northern Ireland. He was promoted to Officer of the Order of the British Empire (OBE) in the 1971 New Year Honours.

He was then appointed to the staff at the Staff College, Camberley, and promoted to colonel on 30 June 1972.

== Senior command ==
He was promoted brigadier on 31 December 1973, and appointed commander of 39th Infantry Brigade, based in Northern Ireland, the following year. For his work in Northern Ireland, he was promoted to Commander of the Order of the British Empire (CBE).

In 1975, he was appointed the Deputy Adjutant General of the British Army of the Rhine (BAOR), and on 24 January 1978, he was appointed Commandant of the British Sector in Berlin, with the acting rank of major-general, and received substantive promotion on 22 July 1978. He was appointed Commander of the Royal Victorian Order (CVO) on 25 May 1978. He relinquished command on 15 September 1980.

On 19 December 1980, he was appointed Vice-Adjutant General, and Director of Manning for the Army at the Ministry of Defence, and relinquished the appointment on 29 March 1982.

He succeeded Sir Richard Lawson as GOC Northern Ireland on 1 June 1982, was promoted to lieutenant-general on the same date, and was appointed Knight Commander of the Order of the Bath (KCB) in the 1982 Birthday Honours. He had previously commanded both a roulement battalion and a resident brigade in Northern Ireland, giving him experience of the issues faced in the region. His tour as GOC was mainly marked by a gradual process of reducing the role of Army units in day-to-day security, handing over control to the Royal Ulster Constabulary. He was relieved by Robert Pascoe in June 1985.

== Ceremonial posts ==
On 31 August 1980, he was appointed Colonel of the Royal Scots, and held the post for ten years, until 31 August 1990. He was appointed the Lieutenant of the Tower of London on 1 March 1992, and held the post until 1 March 1995.

His medals are now held in the Museum of the Royal Scots in Edinburgh Castle.

== Personal life ==
Richardson married Maureen Robinson in 1956; they had four children, Claire, Charles, Jeremy and Guy; she died in 1986. In 1988 he married Alexandra (Candy) Inglis (née Bomford); she survived him and died in 2025.

Military offices
| Preceded by Sir Roy Redgrave | Commandant, British Sector in Berlin; 1978−1980 | Succeeded by Sir David Mostyn |
| Preceded by Sir Richard Lawson | General Officer Commanding the British Army in Northern Ireland; 1982−1985 | Succeeded by Robert Pascoe |
