= 181st Field Regiment, Royal Artillery =

6th Bn, King's Shropshire Light Infantry 181st Field Regiment, Royal Artillery
- Cap badge of the Royal Regiment of Artillery.
- Active: 1 March 1942 – 9 January 1946
- Country: United Kingdom
- Branch: British Army
- Type: Field artillery
- Size: Regiment
- Part of: 15th (Scottish) Infantry Division
- Nickname: "The Shropshire Gunners"
- Engagements: Operation Epsom; Operation Bluecoat; Geel 's-Hertogenbosch; Asten; Blerick; Operation Veritable; Operation Plunder; Uelzen; Elbe

Commanders
- Notable commanders: Sir Otway Herbert

The 181st Field Regiment, Royal Artillery ('The Shropshire Gunners') was a unit of the Royal Artillery, raised by the British Army during World War II. First raised as infantry of the 6th Battalion, King's Shropshire Light Infantry from the Welsh Borders, it was converted to the field artillery role, serving in a Scottish formation in the North West Europe campaign in which it was the first British field artillery regiment to cross the Rhine and Elbe rivers.

== 6th King's Shropshire Light Infantry ==
In June 1940, shortly after the British Expeditionary Force was evacuated from Dunkirk, the King's Shropshire Light Infantry (KSLI) began forming a new 6th Battalion at its regimental depot at Shrewsbury. A previous 6th (Service) Battalion had been raised as part of Kitchener's Army during the Great War of 1914–18, and the men of the new unit were conscious of its heritage. The bulk of the men (95 per cent) were recent conscripts, mostly from Shropshire, Herefordshire, Staffordshire, and other parts of the Welsh Borders and the English Midlands. The battalion's four rifle companies were designated W, X, Y and Z and the Commanding Officer of the battalion was Lt-Col Robert Munn, who had served with the KSLI in the First World War and was awarded a Military Cross.

The new battalion was officially formed by 4 July 1940 and moved to the Dukeries area of Nottinghamshire to commence basic training. Battalion Headquarters was established first at Thoresby Park and then a short distance away at Welbeck Abbey. On 12 October the 6th KSLI became part of the new 204th Independent Infantry Brigade (Home), which had been formed by No 4 Infantry Training Group.

After six months' training, the 6th KSLI and the rest of 204 Bde were sent at the beginning of January 1941 to man coastal defences in Lincolnshire as part of Lincolnshire County Division, which became operational on 27 March.

== 181st Field Regiment, RA ==
In January 1942, when the battalion was stationed at Melton Mowbray, orders were received to convert 6th KSLI into a field regiment of the Royal Artillery (RA). The change was officially carried out on 28 February, when the battalion became 181st Field Regiment. Officers were given the choice of transferring to the RA or to another infantry unit; 484 Other Ranks continued with the regiment after suitability tests, while 140 transferred to other battalions of the KSLI and the Herefordshire Light Infantry and a similar number went to the Pioneer Corps. Specialists and signallers were drafted in from the RA, bringing the strength up to 672 all ranks. Lieutenant-Colonel E.O. Herbert, DSO, RA, was appointed to command the new regiment.

=== Training ===
181 Field Regiment transferred to Northern Command to begin artillery training on ranges in North Yorkshire. It was organised into three batteries: 'Q' training drivers, 'R' training gunners, and 'S' training signallers; these were redesignated P, Q and R respectively on 11 March 1942. Later, the training batteries exchanged Troops to give three equal batteries, designated 177, 178 and 179 on 1 January 1943. Each battery was to be equipped with eight 25-pounder guns, though at first there were only two on which to train, and still only four in April 1942.

On 7 November 1942, 181 Field Regiment was assigned to 15th (Scottish) Infantry Division (replacing a Scottish artillery unit, which had already gone on active service), and began training with 44th (Lowland) Brigade, with whose units it would operate in action:

- 177 Battery supporting 8th Bn Royal Scots
- 178 Battery supporting 6th Bn King's Own Scottish Borderers
- 179 Battery supporting 6th Bn Royal Scots Fusiliers.

=== Overlord ===
In March 1943 the division was raised to full war establishment, initially as a 'Mixed' division including an armoured brigade, then from September 1943 as a conventional infantry division as part of Second Army in 21st Army Group preparing for the Allied landings in Normandy (Operation Overlord). In that month, 15th (S) Division moved from Northumberland to a training area in the West Riding of Yorkshire and began a series of training exercises through the winter. In mid-February the whole division participated in a 12-day training exercise (Exercise Eagle) in the Yorkshire Wolds along with the other divisions assigned to VIII Corps. On 22 April 1944, 181 Fd Regt moved south to the Worthing area as part of the concentration for Overlord. Then on 10 June it was moved close to Tilbury Docks ready for embarkation in two Liberty ships, which sailed on 12 and 13 June, arriving off Arromanches-les-Bains on the evening of 15 June (D + 9). Disembarkation was disrupted by a storm: 178 and 179 Btys were landed by 19 June, but RHQ and 177 Bty could not get ashore, at another beach, until 21 June, and then without guns and most of their equipment.

=== Normandy ===
The assault formations of 21st Army Group had landed on D Day (6 June). 15th (S) Division was not completely ashore until 23 June. The guns then moved up into 'hides' during 24 June before the division was committed to its first action in the Battle of the Odon (Operation Epsom). The regiment was shelled on 25 June and took its first battle casualties, one gun being hit with three of its crew killed and three wounded. The following day 181 Fd Rgt fired its guns in action for the first time as 15th (S) Division commenced Epsom at 07.30. It attacked on a two-brigade front behind a Creeping barrage fired by 344 divisional and corps field and medium guns. The objective was to force crossings of the Rivers Orne and Odon. The infantry fought their way into the villages of Cheux and St Manvieu but the Odon bridges were still 2 miles (3.2 km) away at the end of the first day. At one point there was a threat of German tanks breaking through and 181 Fd Rgt prepared to fire in the anti-tank role over open sights. The fighting was intense, but on the second day the Scots captured the vital bridge over the Odon. By now 15th (S) Division had created a deep salient into the German positions (known as 'Scottish Corridor') without reaching the Orne. Over following days the Germans made repeated attempts to overwhelm the corridor. Ultimately the Germans could not take the pounding from concentrated Allied firepower and had to stop their attacks. However, Operation Epsom caused a quarter of all the casualties suffered by 15th (S) Division in the North West Europe campaign.

For the next month the division fought its way slowly through the Bocage country, capturing Éterville, retaking Gavrus and advancing to Évrecy in Operations Jupiter and Greenline. Early on the morning of 16 July 181's forward observation officer (FOO), Capt Meredith, was advancing with a troop of four 17-pounder guns of 97th Anti-Tank Rgt who got lost. He called down a defensive fire (DF) task on Évrecy to get his bearings, and found his own shells landing all round him. Realising that they were in Évrecy itself, and it was full of German tanks, he and the anti-tank gunners quickly withdrew in the dark.

After Greenline the division was rapidly switched west for Operation Bluecoat, the attack on Caumont-sur-Orne, beginning on 30 July. This allowed the artillery little time to plan, and to preserve secrecy there was no preliminary bombardment. 181st Field Rgt married up as usual with 44th (Lowland) Bde, its observation posts (OPs) accompanying the infantry; the field regiments also had OPs in tanks with the supporting 6th Guards Tank Brigade. 15th (Scottish) Division's artillery including 181 Fd Rgt was tasked with firing concentrations in support of the attacking troops in Phase I. For Phase II a 110-minute slow barrage was fired. Three-quarters of the 25-pdr rounds were fuzed to Air burst, which was effective over bocage and allowed the tanks to keep close to the barrage in safety. The division's objective was Point 309 ('Quarry Hill') to protect the flank of the attack. Launched on 30 July the attack made good progress, with 15th (S) Division getting onto the Estry and Perrier Ridges to support the advancing armour. Heavy fighting ensued for several days, 15th (S) Division supporting 43rd (Wessex) Division's seizure of Mont Pinçon on 6 August. By 11 August 181 Fd Regt had reached Monchamp near Caen. On 13 August the Germans began to withdraw and 15th (S) Division was relieved and went for its first rest since the landings.

=== Belgium ===
After its rest, the division joined XII Corps and was engaged in rapid movements as 21st Army Group advanced to the River Seine. 15th (S) Division made an assault crossing of the river against limited opposition, and the Royal Engineers soon erected bridges to allow the supporting units to cross. The division pressed on to Les Andelys, finding the Germans already gone. The armoured divisions then passed through, and 15th (S) Division followed them into Belgium, 181 Field Rgt crossing the border on 6 September. The following day, guided by Belgian Resistance fighters, 177 Bty's FOO, Capt Jack Cunis from an OP at the top of a block of flats, brought down regimental fire all day at columns of retreating German: the divisional history described it as 'a target such as generations of gunners dreamed of'.

The regiment reached the Albert Canal on 12 September, where the division took over a small bridgehead near Geel. Next day the it pushed on to the Junction Canal. Here on the night of 14/15 September it seized a bridgehead over the canal at Aart, but it attracted no less than 13 German counter-attacks over the next eight days that reduced it to an area less than 440 yards square. Ammunition shortage restricted the divisional artillery to urgent DF tasks only. One attack on the evening of 16 September was held off by small arms fire, while the guns hit the enemy troops in the rear, then caught another counter-attack as it was forming up. Operation Market Garden was launched on 17 September, with XXX Corps breaking out of its own canal bridgehead. Given the fierce resistance at Aart, XII Corps HQ decided to cross elsewhere, while 15th (S) Division merely improved its position and bridged the Junction Canal. The divisional artillery continued its DF tasks to break up counter-attacks. Despite the artillery Observation Posts being shelled and disrupted, 181's CO, Lt-Col Dick Bethell, organised fire plans that beat off the attacks. The regiment's FOOs working in a tall factory building won high praise during this action, and afterward the 181st was awarded three Military Crosses, three Military Medals and a Distinguished Service Order (to Bethell) for this action.

=== Netherlands ===
15th (Scottish) Division next went into action at Best on 21 September in an attempt to widen XXX Corps' narrow corridor. The divisional artillery OP parties took up position in the Bata Shoe Factory. On 26 September the division put in a set-piece attack on the cement factory with 46th (H) Bde, supported by the whole of the divisional artillery. Although Operation Market Garden had ended in failure, fighting continued round Best until 1 October, when the division was finally relieved for rest.

After another short rest, 181 Fd Rgt went into action on 19 October for Operation Pheasant to support 51st (Highland) Division, which was attacking 's-Hertogenbosch. After 15th (Scottish) liberated Tilburg on 28 October, the Germans put in a heavy counter-attack against 7th US Armored Division at Asten. The division's troops were rushed across to help stop the attack up the Asten–Meijel road. Afterwards 15th (Scottish) Division remained at Meijel under heavy German artillery fire for several weeks. 181 Field Rgt was engaged for six days under bomb and shell fire before this was suppressed. The Germans withdrew on 18 November, and the division followed up in bad weather. It was relieved on 27–28 November.

On 3 December the Division carried out a textbook attack on Blerick to eliminate the remaining German bridgehead on the River Maas, opposite Venlo. It employed a single brigade, 44th (L), backed by Second Army's's superior resources in airpower, engineering and artillery to overcome formidable minefields, anti-tank ditches and fortifications. The divisional artillery was reinforced with no less than three Army Groups Royal Artillery (AGRAs), making a total of over 400 guns, including super-heavies. The artillery programme began at 05.25, when 'Blerick was blotted out by smoke and dust and sheets of flame'. The breaching operation started at 07.25 and was a complete success, with low casualties.

The following day the regiment lost one of its best-known members, Gunner Frederick 'Paddy' Mills, a pre-war professional footballer for Leeds United, who dismounted from a vehicle while it was halted in a taped route through a minefield. It was unclear whether he stepped on a mine or tried to retrieve a booby-trapped box, but he was killed instantly.

15th (Scottish) Division remained on the line of the Maas for the next seven weeks while Second Army turned to assist US forces to block the German Ardennes Offensive.

=== Rhineland ===
On 17 January 1945, the divisional artillery shot in support of an attack by 7th Armoured Division on Roermond. Then between 23 and 28 January 15th (S) Division was concentrated at Tilburg to prepare for Operation Veritable to clear the Reichswald between the Maas and the River Rhine. The division was given four objectives, the first and easiest phase (Operation Gilbert) was to close up to the Siegfried Line defences. Advancing on a two-brigade front, the attack was supported by the divisional artillery reinforced by two self-propelled field regiments and a medium regiment. The divisional artillery moved up to its assembly area on the night of 5/6 February, the field regiments taking up positions astride the main road by last light on 7 February. The preliminary bombardment of the enemy defences began at 05.00 on 8 February, and at 07.30 the guns switched to firing smoke screens designed to draw enemy fire against the expected attack. There was then a pause to allow the sound-rangers and flash-spotters to locate the German artillery. The destructive fire was renewed at 07.50, with Counter-battery fire until 10.00 when the barrage began. H Hour for 15 (S) Division was at 10.30 and then the barrage advanced ahead of the infantry in a series of 300 yards (270 m) lifts every 12 minutes; each lift was signalled to the infantry by one gun of each troop firing a round of yellow smoke. By keeping up with the barrage the infantry achieved the first objective successfully, but Operation Sullivan, to breach the Siegfried Line at 21.00, was held up by traffic jams and bad going. By 08.00 the following morning there was still no sign of the battalion due to carry out the attack. When the attack went in, Capt A.D.G. Shaw of D Troop, 178 Battery, took command of an infantry company that had lost all its officers and led it to its objective, while continuing to direct the fire of his guns from his Forward Observation Post. (He had trained as an infantryman with 6th KSLI). Shaw was awarded a DSO for this action.

It took until the evening of 9/10 February for the division to reach its main objective, the 'Materborn Feature' overlooking the town of Kleve. Over following days it made slow progress through the forest against increasing German artillery. Conditions were so bad that 25-pdr ammunition had to be delivered to the guns by amphibious vehicles until a circuitous road was opened up. Two brigades of the division were relieved on 15 February, but 46th (H) Bde continued attacking Moyland Castle until 17 February. The division then took part in Operation Blockbuster to capture Goch. It was finally relieved on 25–26 February.

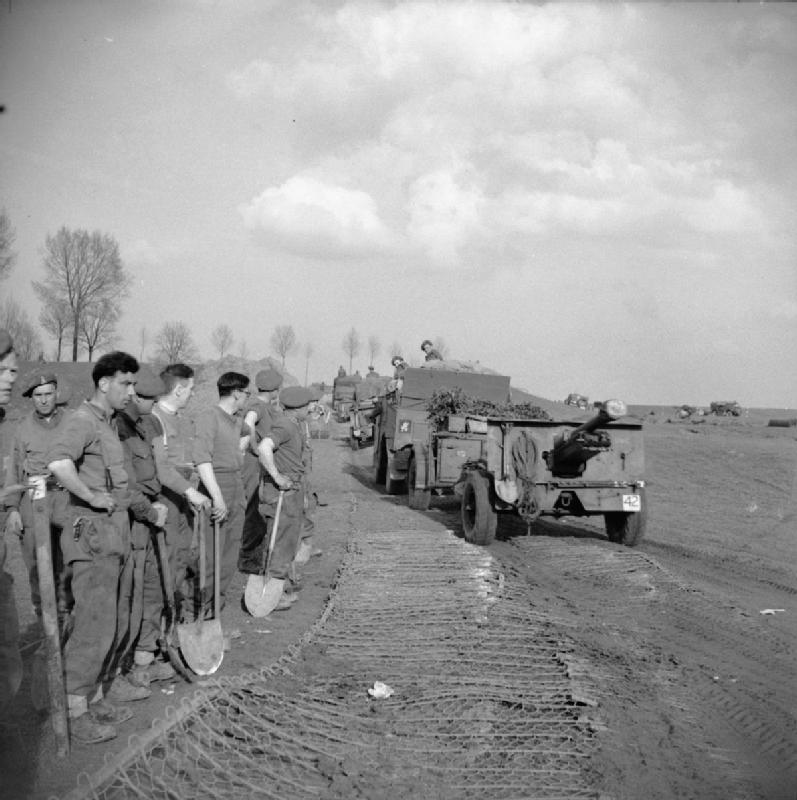
25-pounders moving up to cross the Rhine, March 1945.

=== Rhine crossing ===
On 1 March 1945, 181 Fd Rgt was withdrawn to Belgium to begin training for the assault crossing of the River Rhine (Operation Plunder). 15th (Scottish) Division's role was to establish a two-brigade bridgehead at Xanten in Operation Torchlight covered by an intense artillery bombardment. 181 Field Rgt was then to cross to support 44 (Lowland) Bde. Establishing gun positions and dumping of ammunition close up to the river was carried out behind a massive smokescreen, and the guns moved in on the night of 22 March. The bombardment for XXX Corps' crossing began at 17.00 on 23 March, followed an hour later by the 700 guns of XII Corps supporting 15th (S) Division. The preparation began with counter-battery (CB) fire, then at 11.30 the full 'softening' bombardment began. 44th (L) Brigade's crossing went off successfully and it made good progress on the far bank. The artillery fell silent just before 10.00 on 24 March as the aircraft carrying XVIII Airborne Corps went over to drop their troops behind the German defenders in Operation Varsity. 181 Field Rgt was rafted over in the afternoon, the first field artillery to cross the Rhine, and went into action with 44 Bde as German resistance stiffened.

=== To the Elbe ===
After completing mopping up operations the division was pulled out of action on 29 March and went into billets in German houses; 181 Fd Rgt harboured in Münster. On 3 April it was on the move again, to catch up with the fighting and it took the lead on 10 April, advancing towards Uelzen, mopping up scattered German forces. On 20 April the regiment reached the River Elbe. Here it halted for nine days to prepare for the assault crossing. The CB bombardment began at midnight on 28 April, and the softening bombardment at 00.50. The sight of this bombardment playing on the opposite cliffs under the artificial moonlight provided by searchlights was described as 'awe-inspiring'. The amphibious vehicles began crossing at 02.00, when the barrage lifted from the shoreline to the top of the cliff. By 08.00 the assaulting battalions had cleared the riverside villages and were advancing over the plateau behind. Next day the division drove off the last counter-attack of the campaign. 181 Field Rgt itself crossed the river on 30 April, once again being the first field regiment to do so. The division continued to advance rapidly through the Sachsenwald towards Hamburg, which surrendered before the division reached itt. The regiment's batteries were in constant demand in the final days of the war. 178 Battery was the last subunit in action, on 4 May 1945, the day of the German surrender at Lüneburg Heath.

After some months of occupation duties in Germany, 181 Field Regiment was formally disbanded on 9 January 1946. Many of the remaining personnel who had not already been demobilised or sent to South East Asia Command were posted to 121st (The Leicestershire Regiment) Light Anti-Aircraft Regiment, RA.

== Uniform ==
While part of 204 Bde, the battalion wore that formation's badge on the upper sleeve. This comprised a triangle composed of three smaller conjoined triangles in the Facing colours of its three senior units: buff (South Lancashire Regiment), pearl grey (Leicestershire Regiment) and Lincoln green (Sherwood Foresters), the whole being edged in blue (KSLI).

When converted to the RA, there was a shortage of insignia, so on 27 March 1942 the troops were ordered to cut off the 'KING'S' and 'L.I.' from the ends of their cloth shoulder titles, leaving 'SHROPSHIRE', which led to the regiment's nickname 'the Shropshire Gunners'. They were allowed to keep their light infantry green Field service caps instead of the RA's red and blue, and officers could retain their green lanyards and KSLI buttons. All ranks exchanged their KSLI cap badges for RA 'gun' or 'bomb' badges. Lieutenant-Colonel Herbert devised a distinctive embroidered arm badge for the regiment, of a light infantry bugle-horn embroidered in gold on a green background. This was worn throughout the unit's service in the RA.

While in Northern Command the regiment wore that formation's green apple badge, but on joining the 15th Scottish Division it adopted the divisional shoulder badge of the rampant lion. The men were issued with the Scottish Tam o' Shanter head-dress (the smaller Balmoral bonnet for officers) on which RA 'bomb' badges were worn on a red and blue cloth strip.

== Commanding officers ==
The following officers commanded 6th Bn KSLI/181 Fd Regt RA:

- Lt-Col R.B.S. Munn, MC, commanded 6th KSLI throughout its existence, but did not transfer to the RA.
- Lt-Col E.O. Herbert (later Lt-Gen Sir Otway Herbert), appointed 1 March 1942; went to North Africa as CO of 132 Field Regiment.
- Lt-Col (later Brig) A.C.E. Devereux, commanded in Normandy.
- Lt-Col (later Brig) R.B.W. Bethell, DSO, appointed 6 August 1944; posted to SEAC as Commander, RA, of 23rd Indian Division in March 1945.
- Lt-Col (later Brig) T.P. Keene, appointed 6 March 1945.
