= Albert Watson II =

United States Army general (1909–1993)

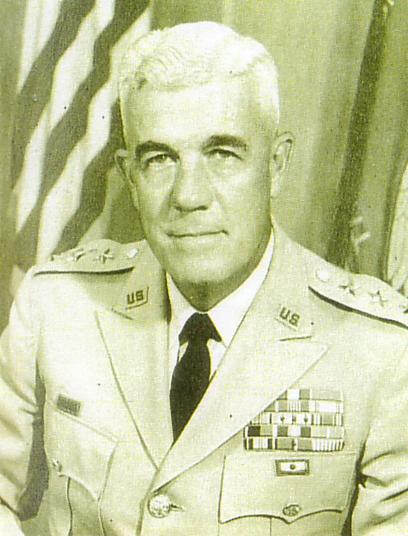
- Born: January 5, 1909; Mount Vernon, Illinois
- Died: March 14, 1993 (aged 84); San Antonio, Texas
- Military career
- Allegiance: United States
- Branch: United States Army
- Service years: 1930–1966
- Rank: Lieutenant General
- Commands: United States Civil Administration of the Ryukyu Islands; IX Corps; United States Third Army; Commandant of Berlin; 24th Infantry Division
- Conflicts: World War II: Operation Cartwheel; Battle of Leyte; Battle of Okinawa; Korean War
- Awards: Army Distinguished Service Medal (2); Legion of Merit

Albert Watson II (January 5, 1909 – March 14, 1993) was a United States Army lieutenant general. He participated in World War II and fought in a number of significant battles in the Pacific Theater, including the Battle of Okinawa. From May 1961 to January 1963, Watson served as Commandant of Berlin and commanded American military forces there when construction of the Berlin Wall began. A major diplomatic incident occurred when members of Watson's staff were refused access to East Berlin. Riots also broke out during his tenure following the death of Peter Fechter. From 1964 to 1965, Watson filled the position of Commissioner of the United States Civil Administration of the Ryukyu Islands. He increased Ryuku autonomy but ultimately spoke against the significant lessening of American administration authority in the Ryukyus. Watson received two Army Distinguished Service Medals during his career.

== Personal life ==
Watson was born on January 5, 1909, and grew up in Mount Vernon, Illinois. His father was an army colonel and his grandfather, Albert Watson, was a member of the Supreme Court of Illinois. His family raised him Episcopalian and he remained so throughout his life.

Watson married Anne Dunlap Bucher and had two children with her: Albert Watson III and John B. Watson. Both of his sons attended military schools in Pennsylvania. He became reasonably fluent in German while serving in the country. His hobbies included playing tennis and golf. The Berlin press also noted that he enjoyed horseback riding, bridge, light opera, and mystery novels. Syracuse University holds the collection of his writings in their Special Collections Research Center.

== Military career ==
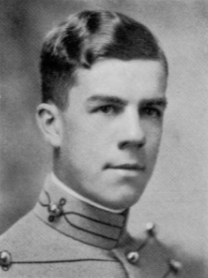
As a West Point cadet

Watson graduated from the United States Military Academy at West Point in 1930, and from the United States Army Field Artillery School as part of the 1934–1935 class. Watson both graduated from and served as a member of the faculty at the United States Army War College. At the college he taught strategy, tactics, and geopolitics.

Watson participated in Operations Reckless and Persecution, the Battle of Leyte, and the Battle of Okinawa during World War II. He served mainly with the Tenth Army in New Guinea. Afterward he served as the Director of Personnel Plans in the Office of Deputy Chief of Staff for Personnel. He also fought in the Korean War.

Watson commanded the United States Third Army from 1963 to 1964. He also commanded two infantry divisions stationed in West Germany, including the 24th Infantry Division. Upon retiring he had reached the rank of lieutenant general.

=== Commandant of Berlin ===
Watson was Commandant of Berlin as a major general from May 5, 1961, to January 2, 1963. In this position he fulfilled many roles, reporting to Ambassador Walter C. Dowling in a diplomatic role, General Lauris Norstad in a military role, and communicated directly to the United States Department of State through United States mission head E. Allan Lightner Jr. He received his first Army Distinguished Service Medal during his years as commandant.

Construction of the Berlin Wall began during his tenure as commandant. In a show of defiance regarding a portion of the Wall set up there, Watson was ordered to set up a military presence in the Steinstücken enclave and sent continuing helicopter flights to the contested area. Tank showdowns would also take place in the wall's early years.

A small diplomatic incident occurred when Watson cancelled an appointment with the Soviet Commandant of East Berlin, Soloviev. East German border guards, whose authority the United States did not recognize, denied access to his two aides and his interpreter after they did not show papers at the border despite being in an official army car and the American insistence that only Soviet officials could demand that American military show identification; this prompted Watson to turn around and send protest to the Soviets instead of meeting with them. Ironically, the meeting had in part been called to discuss the barring of an American official's entry into East Berlin less than a week earlier. Watson responded by blocking Soloviev and his chief political adviser from entering the American sector. A second diplomatic crisis occurred when Soviet official P. V. Signaov refused to meet with Watson over the latter's refusal to stop West German youth from throwing stones at East German buses. He also dealt with the Peter Fechter incident and the riots that followed Fechters murder.

=== Commissioner of the Ryukyu Islands ===
Watson became Commissioner of the United States Civil Administration of the Ryukyu Islands and commander of the IX Corps on August 1, 1964. The State Department originally intended General Charles H. Bonesteel III for the role; when Bonesteel proved unable to fill the position due to failing eyesight, they offered Watson the job instead.

In August 1965, Watson received Prime Minister of Japan Eisaku Satō, becoming the first Commissioner of the islands to meet with a Japanese head of government. Watson also greatly increased the amount of aid that Japan was allowed to give to the islands far above the figures that his predecessors had allowed. He made attempts to improve relations between the American military and Ryukyu legislature. He expanded autonomy and Japanese involvement to an extent and expressed a more lenient attitude to the residents of the island chain. However, he refused to give up United States administrative rights to the island, stating that doing so would lower troop mobility and threaten national security.

Despite a promising start, Watson continued the trend of his predecessor and practiced a tumultuous relationship with United States Ambassador to Japan, Edwin O. Reischauer. The two accused each other of keeping the other out of the loop and breaking agreements. He received a second Army Distinguished Service Medal at the end of his term as commissioner.
