= David Mostyn (British Army officer) =

British Army general

General Sir David Mostyn KCB CBE
- Born: 28 November 1928
- Died: 20 January 2007 (aged 78)
- Military career
- Allegiance: United Kingdom
- Branch: British Army
- Service years: 1948–1989
- Rank: General
- Service number: 397994
- Unit: Oxfordshire and Buckinghamshire Light Infantry
- Commands: 2nd Battalion, Royal Green Jackets; 8 Infantry Brigade; British Forces in Berlin
- Conflicts: Brunei Revolt; Operation Banner
- Awards: Knight Commander of the Order of the Bath; Commander of the Order of the British Empire; Mentioned in Despatches

General Sir Joseph David Frederick Mostyn, KCB, CBE (28 November 1928 – 20 January 2007) was a British soldier and one-time Adjutant-General to the Forces.

== Military career ==
Educated at Downside School and at the Royal Military Academy, Sandhurst, David Mostyn was commissioned into the Oxfordshire and Buckinghamshire Light Infantry in 1949. He was mentioned in despatches for helping to suppress the Brunei Revolt in 1962 whilst serving with the 1st Green Jackets (43rd and 52nd). In 1969 he was appointed commanding officer of the 2nd Battalion The Royal Green Jackets and was deployed to BAOR and Northern Ireland. In 1972 he went on to command the 8th Infantry Brigade. In 1980 he became Commandant of the British Sector in Berlin and in 1983 he was appointed Military Secretary. He went on to be Adjutant General in 1986 retiring from the British Army in 1989.

He was made an ADC General to the Queen in 1987.

He was appointed a Member of the Order of the British Empire in 1962, promoted to Commander in the Order in 1974, and made Knight Commander of the Order of the Bath in 1984.

In retirement he became Chairman of the Lyme Regis Hospital Trust.

== Family ==
In 1952 he married Diana Patricia Sheridan and together they went on to have four sons and two daughters. Lady Mostyn died in 2018.

Military offices
Preceded by Sir Robert Richardson	Commandant, British Sector in Berlin; 1980–1983	Succeeded by Bernard Gordon Lennox
Preceded by Sir Roland Guy	Military Secretary; 1983–1986	Succeeded by Sir Patrick Palmer
Preceded by Sir Roland Guy	Adjutant General; 1986–1988	Succeeded by Sir Robert Pascoe
