= Joseph C. McDonough =

United States Army general (1924–2005)

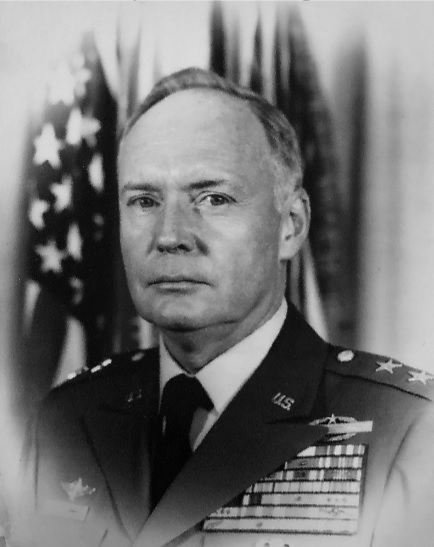
- MG Joseph C. McDonough
- Born: September 30, 1924; New York City, U.S.
- Died: June 22, 2005 (aged 80); Loudoun, Virginia, U.S.
- Burial place: Arlington National Cemetery
- Military career
- Allegiance: United States of America
- Branch: United States Army
- Service years: 1945–1978
- Rank: Major general
- Unit: Infantry Branch
- Commands: United States Commander, Berlin; 8th Infantry Division; 196th Infantry Brigade
- Conflicts: Korean War; Vietnam War: Operation Pershing; Operation Pegasus; Battle of Khe Sanh
- Awards: Distinguished Service Medal (2); Silver Star; Legion of Merit (2); Distinguished Flying Cross; Bronze Star Medal (2) with "V" device Air Medal (33)

Joseph Corbett McDonough (September 30, 1924 – June 22, 2005) was a highly decorated United States Army Major General who served for 33 years including one combat tour during the Korean War and two combat tours during the Vietnam War. During his first tour in Vietnam (1967–1968), then Colonel McDonough commanded the 2nd Brigade, 1st Air Cavalry Division which played a crucial role in Operation Pegasus, the relief of the besieged U.S. Marine Combat Base at Khe Sanh in April 1968. General McDonough went on to hold several staff and command positions including Commanding General, 8th Infantry Division between 1973-1975 and United States Commander, Berlin 1975–1978.

== Early life and education ==
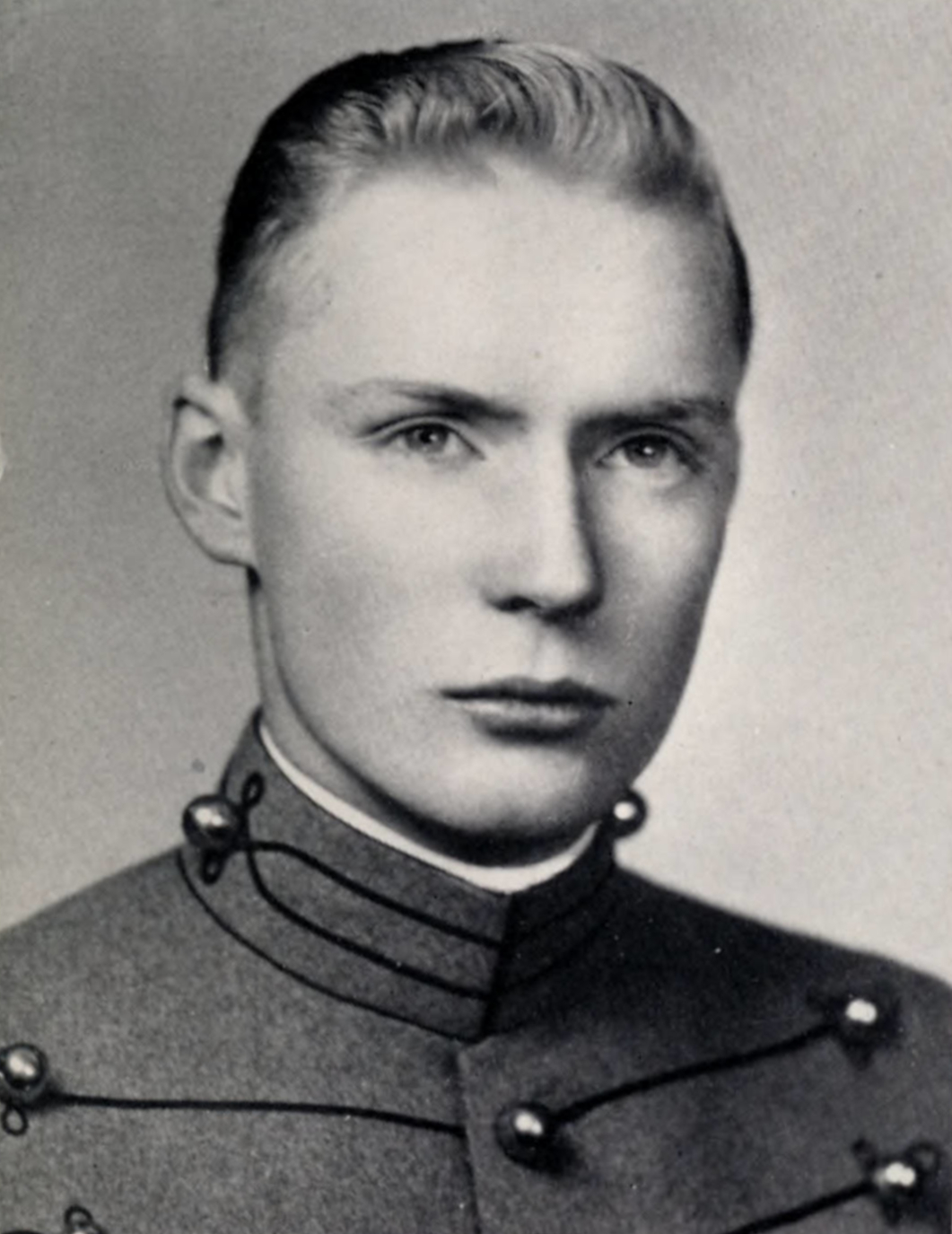
At West Point in 1945

McDonough was born into an Irish American family in New York City on September 30, 1924, and grew up in Chatham Borough, New Jersey. He graduated from the United States Military Academy at West Point in June 1945 with a Bachelor of Science degree and was commissioned a second lieutenant in the Infantry. He earned a Master of Arts degree in International Relations from Georgetown University in 1957.

== Military career ==
=== Early service ===
After graduating from West Point in June 1945, he attended the Basic Course at Army Infantry School at Fort Benning, Georgia and was sent to the Philippines for two and half years and served as a company commander in both U.S. and Philippine Scout Infantry Units. In 1947 he returned to the United States for duty with the 2nd Infantry Division at Fort Jackson, South Carolina. Upon the completion of parachute training in 1948, McDonough joined the 82nd Airborne Division at Fort Bragg, North Carolina where he served for three years as a company grade commander and staff officer.

In 1951-1952 he attended the Advanced Course, Infantry School at Fort Benning and from there he was deployed to Korea. McDonough spent a year in combat with the 1st Battalion, 223rd Infantry Regiment as a rifle company commander, battalion operations officer and battalion executive officer and was awarded a Bronze Star Medal for his service.

McDonough returned from Korea in 1953 and attended the Army Command and General Staff College at Fort Leavenworth, Kansas. He reported for duty to the United States Naval Academy at Annapolis, Maryland one year later and served there as an instructor until November 1958. He was subsequently ordered to England where he was a student at the British Staff College, Camberley.

From January 1959 to May 1960, he served in the Plans Branch, Assistant Chief of Staff, Intelligence, Headquarters, U.S. Army, Europe in Heidelberg, West Germany. McDonough then served from May 1960 to June 1961, as Battalion S-3, Battalion Executive Officer and Battalion Commander, 1st Battalion, 54th Infantry, 4th Armored Division stationed in Baden-Württemberg, West Germany.

McDonough then returned to the United States and assumed duty as a Plans and Projects Officer in Infantry Branch Officer Personnel Directorate, Department of the Army, Washington D.C. While in D.C., he was ordered to the Army War College in August 1964 and upon graduation one year later he was assigned to the Office of the Under Secretary of the Army under Stanley Rogers Resor and served as Chief, Military Personnel Management Division.

=== Vietnam War ===
In May 1967, McDonough joined the 1st Air Cavalry Division in Vietnam as the Battalion Commander of the 2nd Battalion, 5th Cavalry. During this period the battalion participated in Operation Pershing I and II which was a battle against enemy forces and an effort to assist the Vietnamese in establishing a pacification program in Bình Định province.

In September 1967, he assumed command of the 2nd Brigade, 1st Air Cavalry Division. The Brigade continued operations in Bình Định province and when the Tet Offensive commenced the 2nd Brigade was tasked with assuming operational responsibility for the Division's entire Area of Operations because the other two Division Brigades were redeployed to reinforce U.S. forces at the Demilitarized Zone and Battle of Hue. The 2nd Brigade subsequently rejoined the Division and on 1 April 1968, the 2nd Brigade, alongside other 1st Cavalry Division elements, conducted Operation Pegasus in order to relieve the Marines at Khe Sanh. On April 7, the 2nd Brigade captured the old French fort near Khe Sanh after a three-day battle. The link-up between the relief force and the Marines at KSCB took place at 08:00 on 8 April, when the 2nd Battalion, 7th Cavalry Regiment entered the camp. The 1st Cavalry Division completed the relief of the Marine units on 10 April and assumed responsibility for the Khe Sanh area of operations.

McDonough completed his tour in Vietnam in May 1968 and departed for the United States. For his service in Vietnam, he was decorated with Distinguished Service Medal, Silver Star, two Legion of Merit, second Bronze Star Medal, the Distinguished Flying Cross and Air Medal with 33 Oak Leaf Clusters. He also received several decorations from the Government of South Vietnam.

== Late career ==
Upon his return, McDonough was promoted to brigadier general and from May 1968 until May 1970 served as a member of the European Branch, J-3, Joint Chiefs of Staff at the Pentagon and then in May 1970 he was assigned as the deputy director of the Operations, National Military Command Center with the Joint Chiefs of Staff. In April 1971, McDonough returned to Vietnam and served as the Assistant Division Commander, 23rd Infantry Division and was then assigned Commanding General, 196th Infantry Brigade which he commanded until June 1972. His brigade assisted in port security duties in Da Nang and was the last combat brigade to leave Vietnam by the end of June 1972.

During the 1970s, McDonough was promoted to major general and held several senior level staff and field level commands including Chief of Staff, Central Treaty Organization – CENTO with headquarters in Ankara, Turkey. He was transferred to West Germany in October 1973 and assumed duty as Commanding General, 8th Infantry Division at Bad Kreuznach.

He held that assignment until July 1975, when he was transferred to Berlin for duty as the United States Commander. He remained in that capacity until June 1978, when he returned to the United States and retired, completing 33 years on active service. McDonough received his second Distinguished Service Medal for his service in Germany. General McDonough's soldiers regarded him as a tough, but fair and compassionate commander. The safety and welfare of his troops was always his priority.

== Retirement ==
After his retirement from the Army, McDonough served as the Executive Vice President of Operations for Butler Aviation in Montvale, New Jersey 1980 – 1992. He died on June 22, 2005, at the age of 80 and was buried at Arlington National Cemetery, Virginia with full military honors. His wife of 60 years Mary Patricia Aaron McDonough (March 11, 1925 – May 18, 2018) was later interred with him.

== Decorations ==
Here is the ribbon bar of Major General Joseph C. McDonough:

Army Parachutists Badge
Combat Infantryman Badge with one star
1st Row	Army Distinguished Service Medal with Oak Leaf Cluster			
2nd Row	Silver Star	Legion of Merit with Oak Leaf Cluster	Distinguished Flying Cross	Bronze Star Medal with Oak Leaf Cluster and "V" device
3rd Row	Air Medal with award numeral 33	Army Commendation Medal with two Oak Leaf Clusters	American Campaign Medal	Asiatic–Pacific Campaign Medal
3rd Row	World War II Victory Medal	Army of Occupation Medal	National Defense Service Medal with Oak Leaf Cluster	Korean Service Medal with three 3/16 inch service stars
4th Row	Vietnam Service Medal with four 3/16 inch service stars	Philippine Independence Medal	National Order of Vietnam, 5th Class	Vietnam Distinguished Service Order, 1st Class
5th Row	Vietnamese Gallantry Cross with Palm and Gold Star	Korean Order of Military Merit, 4th Class	United Nations Korea Medal	Vietnam Campaign Medal

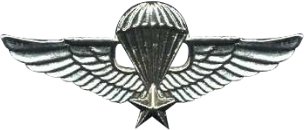

Badge	1st Cavalry Division Combat Service Identification Badge	
Badge	Republic of Vietnam Parachutist Badge	
Ribbons	Republic of Korea Presidential Unit Citation	Republic of Vietnam Gallantry Cross Unit Citation

Badges	Army Staff Identification Badge	Joint Chiefs of Staff Identification Badge
