= Doftana =

Doftana may refer to the following places in Romania:

- Doftana, a village in Telega Commune, Prahova County
- Doftana prison, a Romanian prison built in 1895, located in the above village
- Doftana (Prahova), a tributary of the Prahova in Prahova County
- Doftana (Tărlung), a tributary of the Tărlung in Brașov County

== See also ==
- Dofteana, a commune in Bacău County
- Dofteana (river), a river in Bacău County
