= Frank L. Howley =

United States Army general

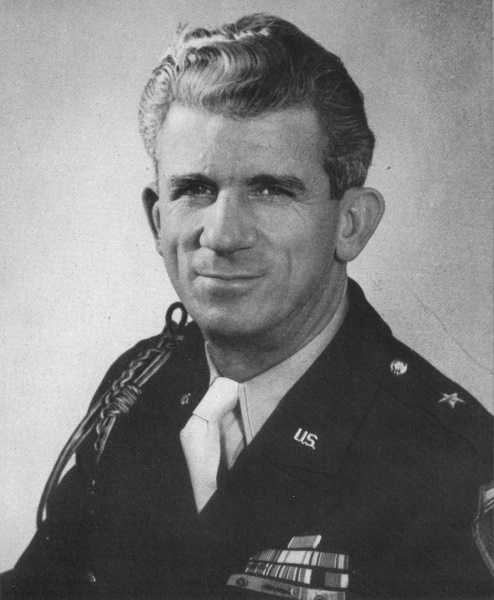
- Frank L. Howley
- Born: February 3, 1903; Hampton, New Jersey
- Died: July 30, 1993 (aged 90) Warrenton, Virginia
- Allegiance: United States of America
- Branch: United States Army
- Service years: 1932–1949
- Rank: Brigadier General
- Commands: Civil Affairs Detachment, A1A1; Director, OMG Berlin Sector; Commandant, Berlin
- Other work: Vice Chancellor of NYU, New York, New York

Frank Leo "Howlin'" Howley (February 3, 1903 – July 30, 1993) was a United States Army brigadier general and subsequently an administrator at New York University. Howley served as commandant of the American sector of Berlin after World War II, when the city was broken and in dire need of being restored. He became known as Howlin' Howley because of his interminable and intractable interactions with the Soviets.

== Early life ==
He was born in Hampton, New Jersey, and was educated at the Parsons School of Fine and Applied Arts in New York City. Howley also attended classes in business and art at the Sorbonne in Paris, and graduated with a B.S. degree in economics from New York University (NYU).

At NYU he played football for the Violets at the positions of left end and placekicker. Although the team was then mediocre at best (1922–1924), Howley gained notoriety for his kicking expertise, and a nickname to match, Golden Toe. During his senior year, in a 41–3 loss to Rutgers, Howley's field goal accounted for their only score. He was also a baseball and track and field athlete.

In the 1930s Howley formed his own advertising agency based in Philadelphia called Frank L. Howley & Associates, and gained business nationwide despite the ongoing economic depression.

== Military career ==
Howley entered the Officers Reserve Corps in 1932 and was called to active duty in 1940. His first assignment was commanding officer of an Air Corps ground school, and he was promoted to captain. In 1941 Howley chose to pursue the cavalry and was made operations officer of the Cavalry School at Fort Riley, Kansas. Sometime later he was made executive officer of the Third Cavalry Mechanized at Camp Gordon, Georgia, and was promoted to the rank of lieutenant colonel. In the summer of 1943, whilst in Georgia, Howley suffered a motorcycle accident and broke his back and pelvis. He was hospitalized more than five months and was eventually forced to transfer from the cavalry. He was told he could go home or move to Military Government, or more precisely, to Civil Affairs. He chose the latter.

=== World War II ===
Howley was assigned to schools in the U.S. and then in England. He was made director of the Military Government Officers' Division based in Shrivenham. Only upon his insistence in taking part in Normandy was he not left behind. For the invasion Howley was designated commander of the Civil Affairs Detachment, with the "mystifying" code name of A1A1. In Normandy he landed on Omaha Beach on D plus 4 with a mixed American-British unit, along with French liaison officers. While the 9th Infantry Division worked to push the Germans out of Cherbourg, but with most of the street fighting over, Howley's A1A1 detachment exercised its mission authority. He augmented and reconstituted the local government, and got the city back on its feet. "The Cherbourg Civil Affairs operation was subsequently described by Allied observers as efficient beyond all expectations."

After an initial mix up of orders, Howley's follow-on assignment became Paris. There he commanded a combined delegation of 150 officers and 200 enlisted men, and entered Paris along with the first troops. This job was much bigger than Cherbourg, and was to provide relief to the beleaguered French capital and its citizens. While in Paris, Howley was selected by Eisenhower's military government chief, Lieutenant General A.E. Grassett, to lead a military government detachment to Berlin. The British troops assigned to his unit received initial orders to return to England for their own preliminary preparations.

In December 1944, Howley set up his headquarters in Barbizon, France, preparing for Berlin. Around SHAEF Barbizon was called "Howley's mystery town." There, he states, they girded themselves "for virtually all eventualities, except, of course, the curious behavior of our Russian allies." Governing Berlin would not be an easy proposition in any case, as it was to be on a unanimous four-power basis. They would have to agree on every point, from food distribution to education.

=== Commandant of the U.S. Sector of Berlin ===
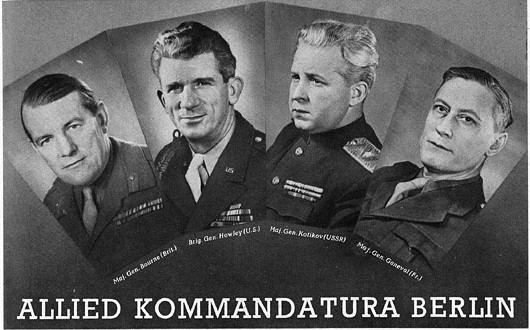
Allied Commandants of Berlin, 1949. From left, Gen. Bourne (Brit.), Gen. Howley (U.S.) Gen. Kotikov (USSR), Gen. Ganeval (Fr.).

Colonel Howley reached Berlin on July 1, 1945, after substantial haranguing by the Soviets. He had about 500 officers and men, and 120 vehicles as he began his expedition through the Soviet Zone. As soon as he arrived at the demarcation line (June 17th) he was told he was limited to 37–50–175, as per the Berlin Agreement. This stipulated, so they said, that he could pass with no more than 37 officers, 50 vehicles, and 175 men. There is no documented evidence of any such agreement. Howley "felt the hairs rising on the back of his neck," as he experienced the first of his many personal disagreements with the Soviets. He ended up serving over four years in Berlin, first as deputy, and then as Commandant of the U.S. sector, and was relieved in 1949.

The city of Berlin was heavily damaged, having been devastated by thousands of tons of bombs by mostly British and American bombers. This was followed by close quarter combat in the streets. On top of that, the city was stripped by the Soviets of industrial infrastructure, particularly in the western sectors. The citizenry was starving, physically sick, mentally exhausted, and demoralized. To make any of this right was the task that awaited the prospective U.S. military governor, and Howley brought to bear a broad background of leadership, experience, and pragmatism.

As director of OMG Berlin Sector, he served as Deputy Commandant and G5 to several commanders of the U.S. Berlin garrison. These were generals Floyd L. Parks, James M. Gavin, Ray W. Barker, Frank A. Keating, Cornelius E. Ryan (no relation to the renowned Irish journalist and author), and William Hesketh. But it was Howley's presence during these first two years that imbued stability in the U.S. sector despite the constant rotation of U.S. commander. The reasons for this were two-fold: first, Howley's expertise was in Military Government. His several superiors, however, were combat soldiers, who often lacked the experience and vision in dealing with civil affairs or in governing Berlin. And secondly, except for Keating, all of his predecessors averaged a stay of less than three and a half months in Berlin. General Lucius D. Clay promoted Howley to Commandant on December 1, 1947, and he succeeded Hesketh. Howley finally had free hand in dealing with the Soviets, but not before the city had suffered significantly, including some of its brightest citizens.

There were a myriad of duties to attend in trying to resurrect a large city that housed millions that had been left to itself and abandoned by its former Nazi leaders. In trying to accomplish this he ran into many obstacles, not the least of which was Howley's main antagonist—and there were plenty to choose from—Soviet Commandant Major General Aleksandr Kotikov. Howley's interminable squabbles and face-offs with Kotikov are documented in detail.

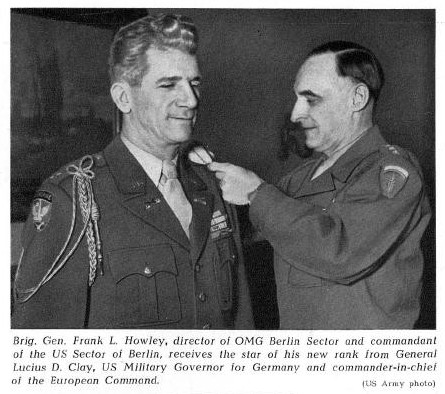
Lucius D. Clay pinning star on Brigadier General Howley, April, 1949.

As commandant of the U.S. Sector of Berlin, Howley was finally promoted to brigadier general in March, 1949. In this he was decorated personally by his superior, General Clay, U.S. Military Governor for Germany and commander-in-chief of the European Command.

G.P. Putnam's Sons, publisher of Berlin Command, put it best, "Frank Howley was a hard-hitting Philadelphia advertising man before he went on active duty with the Army. Tough-minded, brilliant, never giving an inch, he was magnificently suited to face the Russians day after day during the four years he served as deputy and commander of the U.S. forces in besieged Berlin."

In the end, Howley conferred more than 2,000 hours with his Russian, British, and French counterparts. On August 31, 1949, he was relieved of his command and departed Berlin a week later. It was time to go home. He was succeeded by Major General Maxwell D. Taylor, but only as Commandant. Military rule was out, and civil rule was in.

=== Soviet Walkout from the Kommandatura ===
On the night of June 16, 1948, the Soviet delegation unexpectedly withdrew from quadripartite meetings. The commandants and their respective staffs had been quibbling most of the day, having only reached one minor agreement. Towards midnight, Colonel Howley indicated he was tired, asked to be excused, and left his deputy to carry on.

Even though Howley's actions complied with protocol completely, after briefly consulting with their ever present political commissar, the Soviets took offense at Howley's gesture. They declared that unless Howley returned and apologized for his "early" retreat, they would depart and not return. Indeed, they all arose and walked out. Unbeknownst to the western Allies at the time, the Soviets planned to instigate a blockade of western Berlin within days. Howley's departure that night had served them well. Some Kommandatura committees continued to function for several weeks with all four powers represented, even though the Soviet delegation did not attend all scheduled meetings. On August 1, 1948, the Soviet flag was lowered, they left for good, and the four-power Kommandatura ceased to exist.

After that time the three western allied commandants continued to hold unofficial meetings at their own HQ offices. Instead of issuing Kommandatura orders, they basically issued unilateral orders, each man to his own sector, Howley included. However, these were issued in a manner of familial or neighborly cooperation.

== Later career ==
Frank Howley was named Vice Chancellor of New York University, and served in that capacity between 1950 and 1969.

He also appeared before the Senate Judiciary Committee in 1955, regarding the topic of Strategy and Tactics of World Communism. Howley gave sworn testimony regarding his experience in Europe during World War II, and afterwards with the Soviets in Berlin. He was a member of the anti-Castro organization, Citizens Committee for a Free Cuba.

He wrote several publications and books, including The Frank L. Howley Papers, 1944–1950 (1950), Berlin Command (1950), Your War for Peace (1953), and Peoples and Policies: A World Travelogue (1959). The Frank L. Howley Papers, 1944–1950 is an official U.S. Army collection of documents during his time as military governor in Europe, including France and Berlin. Berlin Command is Howley's personal story of his four years in Berlin. It describes in great detail the day to day effort in getting Berlin back on its feet and surviving the Soviets and the Berlin Blockade. This book is consulted, heavily at times, in many works regarding the Berlin Blockade and the resulting Airlift. Your War for Peace was the general's effort at describing various political and military hot spots around the world after the war and during the 1950s.

== Personal life ==
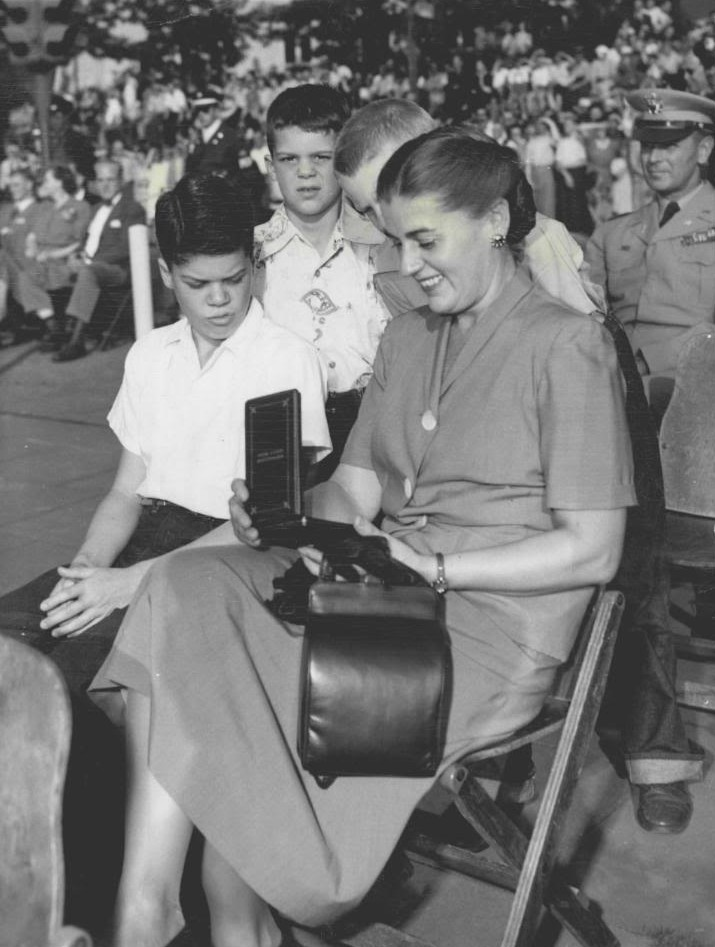
Howely's wife and children, Berlin, 1945.

He was married to Edith Howley, and has four children: three sons, Dennis, Peter, William, and daughter Frances. After the war he moved to a farm in West Grove, Pennsylvania. Howley died in 1993, in Warrenton, Virginia, at age ninety.

== Acknowledgements ==
General Howley was awarded the Distinguished Service Medal September 6, 1949. John J. McCloy, the new High Commissioner of Germany at the time, bestowed the honor on behalf of President Truman.

The city of Berlin named a street after Howley in recognition of his leadership and passion in getting Berlin's citizens back on their respective feet after the war. Frank-L.-Howely-Weg is in the district of Lichterfelde, and runs parallel to two other streets of recognition, Harry-S.-Truman-Allee and William-H.-Tunner-Strasse. All are within the confines of the former McNair Barracks, an American army post during post-war Berlin.

== See also ==
- Allied Control Council
- Allied-occupied Germany
- European Advisory Commission
- Georgy Zhukov
- Military occupation
- Vasily Sokolovsky
