= 204th Independent Infantry Brigade =

204th Independent Infantry Brigade (Home) 204th Independent Infantry Brigade
- Insignia of the 204th Independent Infantry Brigade
- Active: 12 October 1940 – 1 September 1942
- Country: United Kingdom
- Branch: British Army
- Type: Infantry Brigade
- Role: Home Defence

204th Independent Infantry Brigade (Home) was a Home Defence formation of the British Army during the Second World War.

== Origin ==
The 204th Independent Infantry Brigade (Home) was formed for service in the United Kingdom on 12 October 1940 by No 4 Infantry Training Group in the West Midland Area of Home Forces. It was commanded by Brigadier G. McI. Bruce and comprised four newly raised infantry battalions from the North and Midlands of England.

== Service ==
The brigade moved from West Midlands Area to the Lincolnshire County Division when that was formed on 27 March 1941. The Lincolnshire County Division ceased to function on 24 November and the brigade, now re-designated the 204th Independent Infantry Brigade was transferred to the Durham and North Riding Coastal Area. On 1 September 1942, the Brigade headquarters was re-designated 185th Infantry Brigade and its units transferred to other formations. 7th South Lancashires, 12th Foresters and 7th Leicesters went to India while 8th South Lancashires was disbanded.

== Order of battle ==
The composition of the 204th Brigade was as follows:

- 7th Battalion, South Lancashire Regiment (from 12 October 1940 – 31 August 1942)
- 8th Battalion, South Lancashire Regiment (12 October 1940 – 31 May 1941)
- 12th Battalion, Sherwood Foresters (from 12 October 1940 – 31 August 1942)
- 6th Battalion, King's Shropshire Light Infantry (12 October 1940 – 24 November 1941) – converted in March 1943 to the 181st Field Regiment, Royal Artillery
- 7th Battalion, Leicestershire Regiment (26 November 1941 – 31 August 1942)

Attached when an Independent Brigade.

- 204th Independent Infantry Brigade Company Royal Army Service Corps (31 March 1942 – 31 August 1942)

== Insignia ==
The brigade's cloth shoulder badge was a triangle composed of three smaller conjoined triangles in the Facing colours of its three senior units: buff (S. Lancashires), pearl grey (Leicesters) and Lincoln green (Foresters), the whole being edged in blue (KSLI).

== Online sources ==
- Land Forces of Britain, the Empire and Commonwealth (Regiments.org)
- The Royal Artillery 1939–45
