= Geoffrey Bourne, Baron Bourne =

British Army general (1902-1982)

General The Right Honourable The Lord Bourne GCB KBE CMG
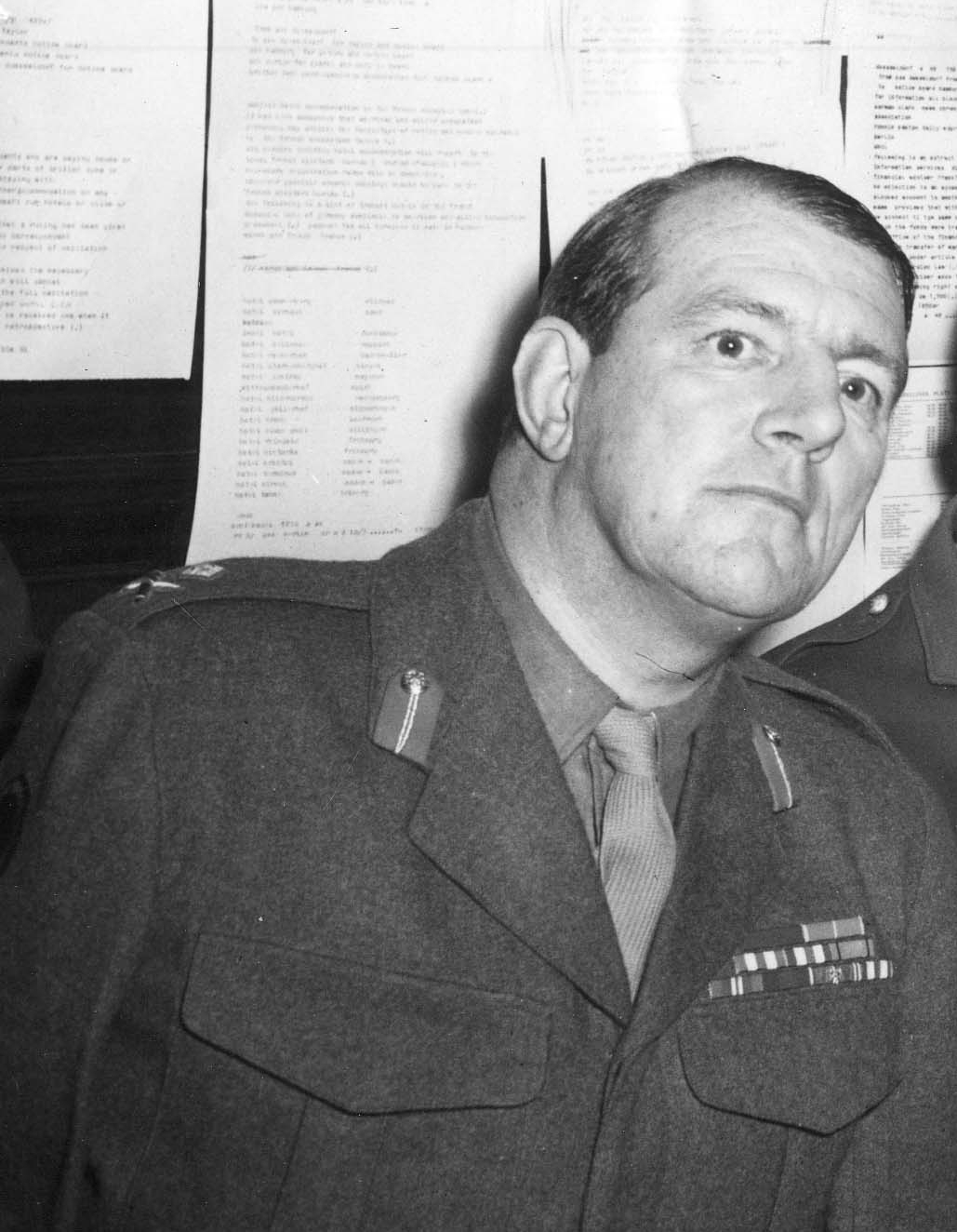
- Bourne in 1948
- Born: 5 October 1902; Kensington, London, England
- Died: 26 June 1982 (aged 79)
- Military career
- Allegiance: United Kingdom
- Branch: British Army
- Service years: 1923–1960
- Rank: General
- Service number: 23643
- Unit: Royal Artillery
- Commands: Imperial Defence College (1958–1960); Middle East Land Forces (1957–1958); Malaya Command (1954–1956); Eastern Command (1953–54); 16th Airborne Division (1951–1952); British Forces Berlin (1949–1951); 5th Indian Infantry Division (1946); 152nd Field Regiment, Royal Artillery (1944); 21st Anti-Tank Regiment, Royal Artillery (1942)
- Conflicts: Second World War; Malayan Emergency; Operation Termite
- Awards: Knight Grand Cross of the Order of the Bath; Knight Commander of the Order of the British Empire; Companion of the Order of St Michael and St George; Silver Star (United States); Legion of Merit (United States)

General Geoffrey Kemp Bourne, Baron Bourne, GCB, KBE, CMG (5 October 1902 – 26 June 1982) was a British Army officer.

== Military career ==
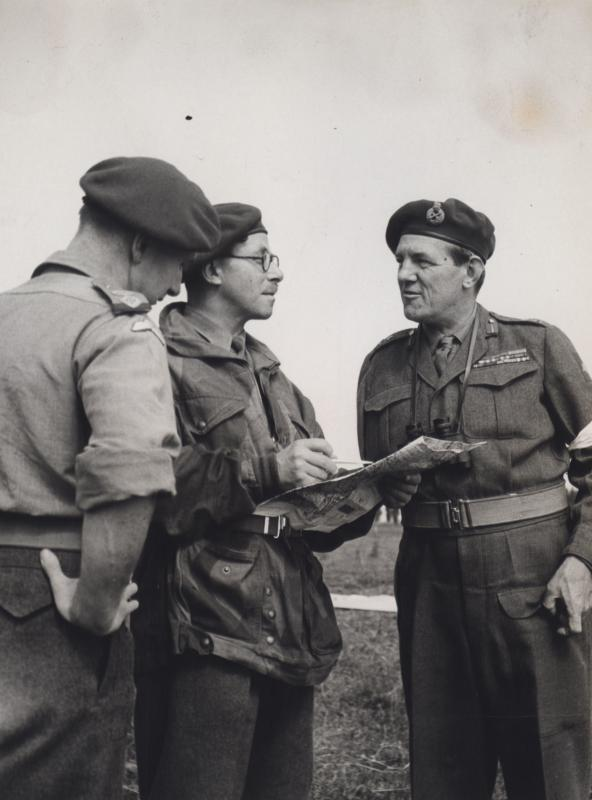
Major General Geoffrey Bourne, GOC 16th Airborne Division, talking with officers of the division during an exercise in Germany while serving with the British Army of the Rhine, 1952.

Commissioned into the Royal Artillery in 1923, Bourne, promoted to lieutenant in February 1925, served in Hong Kong from 1930 to 1932, in Gibraltar from 1933 and 1934, as a student at the Staff College, Camberley in 1935 and 1936, during which time he was promoted to captain, and in Colchester in 1937. In 1938 and 1939, he was a General Staff Officer at the War Office.

During the Second World War, Bourne was a member of the Joint Planning Staff between 1939 and 1941, and a member of the Joint Staff Mission in Washington, D.C. in 1942. In 1944, after commanding the 21st Anti-Tank Regiment, Royal Artillery, throughout most of 1943, and serving for six months as a staff officer with South East Asia Command, he was commander of the 152nd (Ayrshire Yeomanry) Field Regiment, Royal Artillery, fighting with the regiment in Italy, before serving with I Airborne Corps as a Brigadier General Staff (BGS) fighting in Belgium.

Between 1945 and 1946, Bourne was Commander, Royal Artillery with the 5th Indian Division in Java, and worked at the Imperial Defence College in 1947. He was Head of the British Mission to Burma in 1948 and Commandant of the British Sector in Berlin from 1949 to 1951. Between 1951 and 1953 he commanded the 16th Airborne Division, was General Officer Commanding-in-Chief Eastern Command from 1953 to 1954, and General Officer Commanding Malaya from 1954 to 1956. Bourne was Commander-in-Chief, Middle East Land Forces in 1957 and Commandant of the Imperial Defence College from 1958 to 1959. He retired in 1960.

Bourne was also Aide-de-Camp General to The Queen in 1959 and 1960, Colonel Commandant of the Royal Artillery from 1954 to 1967 and Honorary Colonel, 10 Battalion, The Parachute Regiment, Territorial Army from 1960 to 1965.

== Personal life ==
On 11 July 1928, Bourne married Agnes Evelyn Thompson, daughter of Sir Ernest Thompson. The couple had one son, the Hon. Michael Bourne (1937–2013) and one daughter. Lady Bourne died in 1990.

Bourne was invested as a Companion of the Order of St Michael and St George, as a Knight Commander of the Order of the British Empire, and as a Knight Grand Cross of the Order of the Bath. On 22 August 1964, he was created a life peer with the title Baron Bourne, of Atherstone in the County of Warwick.

== Arms ==
Coat of arms of Geoffrey Bourne, Baron Bourne

Crest
Out of a coronet Or in front of two swords in saltire as in the arms a stag's head Proper.
Escutcheon
Azure issuant from the sinister flank a dexter arm embowed in armour the hand grasping a sword erect Proper hilt and pommel Or on a chief Argent three strawberry leaves Proper.
Supporters
On either side a magpie Proper.
Motto
Vestigia Nulla Retrorsum (No Steps Backward)

Military offices
Preceded by Sir Otway Herbert	Commandant, British Sector in Berlin; 1949–1951	Succeeded by Sir Charles Coleman
Preceded by Gerald Lathbury	GOC 16th Airborne Division; 1951–1953	Succeeded by Francis Rome
Preceded by Sir George Erskine	GOC-in-C Eastern Command; 1953–1954	Succeeded by Sir Francis Festing
Preceded by Sir Hugh Stockwell	GOC Malaya; 1954–1956	Succeeded by Sir Roger Bower
Preceded by Sir Charles Keightley	C-in-C Middle East Land Forces; 1957–1958	Succeeded by Sir Roger Bower
Preceded by Sir Guy Russell	Commandant of the Imperial Defence College; 1958–1960	Succeeded by Sir Robert Scott
