= Herefordshire Militia =

Auxiliary unit of the British Army

Herefordshire Militia 4th Battalion, King's Shropshire Light Infantry
- Active: 1558–15 July 1908
- Country: England (1558–1707); Kingdom of Great Britain (1707–1800); United Kingdom (1801–1908)
- Branch: Militia
- Role: Infantry
- Size: Battalion
- Part of: King's Shropshire Light Infantry
- Garrison/HQ: Militia Barracks, Hereford
- Engagements: Irish Rebellion of 1798

The Herefordshire Militia (Note: There is no consistency in the sources as to whether the regiment was the 'Hereford' or 'Herefordshire' Militia, both forms being used indiscriminately.) was an auxiliary military force in the English Midlands county of Herefordshire. From their formal organisation as Trained Bands in 1572, the Militia of Herefordshire provided internal security and home defence during times of international tension and all of Britain's major wars, relieving regular troops from routine garrison duties and acting as a source of trained officers and men for the Regular Army. It later formed a battalion of the King's Shropshire Light Infantry. It was disbanded in 1908.

== Early history ==
The English militia was descended from the Anglo-Saxon Fyrd, the military force raised from the freemen of the shires under command of their Sheriff. It continued under the Norman kings as the Posse comitatus. The force was reorganised under the Assizes of Arms of 1181 and 1252, and again by King Edward I's Statute of Winchester of 1285. Now Commissioners of Array would levy the required number of men from each shire. The usual shire contingent was 1000 infantry commanded by a millenar, divided into companies of 100 commanded by constables or ductores, and subdivided into sections of 20 led by vintenars. The able-bodied men were equipped by their parishes. Edward I regularly summoned the men of the Welsh Marches to fight in his Welsh Wars. (John E. Morris, the historian of Edward's Welsh Wars writing in 1901, likened this process to calling out the Militia Battalion of the King's Shropshire Light Infantry). In July 1287 Herefordshire provided the largest infantry contingent, 1280 men, to the Earl of Cornwall's army against the Welsh rebellion. The Herefordshire men suffered heavy casualties in the siege of Dryslwyn Castle, many in the collapse of a mine they were digging under the wall. Edward also used these organised and experienced contingents in his Scottish campaigns. In 1296 Herefordshire and Cheshire together sent a well-trained 'battalion' to the Dunbar campaign and in February 1298 Wales and the border counties contributed a large part of the force concentrated at Newcastle upon Tyne for the Falkirk campaign. This procedure was continued for border campaigns under later kings. By now the infantry were mainly equipped with the English longbow. For example, Herefordshire supplied 2 ductores, 9 vintenars and 171 foot archers (effectively two companies) for Edward III's summer campaign of 1335 in Scotland.

When invasion threatened in 1539, Henry VIII held a Great Muster of all the counties, recording the number of armed men available in each hundred. The detailed list for Herefordshire showed all the archers and billmen in the county and the 'harness' (armour) and weapons held by the wealthier men. The numbers were:

- Hundred of Radlow – 610
- Hundred of Grymer – 405
- City of Hereford – 346
- Hundred of Huntington – 316
- Hundred of Stretford – 443
- Hundreds of Wigmore, Wolphy and Leominster – 916 (plus 46 sets of harness)
- Hundred of Webtree – 413
- Hundred of Ewyas Lacy – 213

A footnote pointed out that the Hundred of Wigmore had only just been transferred from Wales to Herefordshire and could not provide much armament

== Herefordshire Trained Bands ==
The legal basis of the militia was updated in Queen Mary I's reign with two acts of 1557 covering musters (4 & 5 Ph. & M. c. 3) and the maintenance of horses and armour (4 & 5 Ph. & M. c. 2). The county militia was now under the Lord Lieutenant, assisted by the Deputy Lieutenants and Justices of the Peace (JPs). The entry into force of these acts in 1558 is seen as the starting date for the organised county militia in England.

Although the militia obligation was universal, it was clearly impractical to train and equip every able-bodied man. After 1572 the practice was to select a proportion of men for the Trained Bands (TBs), who were mustered for regular training. When war broke out with Spain training and equipping the militia became a priority. Herefordshire aimed to train half its armed men, but warned that once trained they might become unruly and do little work for their masters. From 1584 counties were organised into groups for training purposes, with emphasis on the invasion-threatened 'maritime' counties. However, distant Wales and the 'Marcher' counties like Herefordshire were given low priority and were not placed under lords-lieutenant and professional training captains until 1586. The Armada Crisis in 1588 led to the mustering of the TBs in April. They were put on one hour's notice in June and called out on 23 July as the Armada approached, though they were never engaged.

In the 16th Century little distinction was made between the militia and the troops levied by the counties for overseas expeditions. Between 1589 and 1601 Herefordshire supplied 1,100 levies for service in Ireland and 300 for the Netherlands. However, the counties usually conscripted the unemployed and criminals rather than the Trained Bandsmen – in 1585 the Privy Council had ordered the impressment of able-bodied unemployed men, and the Queen ordered 'none of her trayned-bands to be pressed'. Replacing the weapons issued to the levies from the militia armouries was a heavy cost on the counties.

With the passing of the threat of invasion, the trained bands declined in the early 17th Century. Later, King Charles I attempted to reform them into a national force or 'Perfect Militia' answering to the king rather than local control. In 1638 the Hereford Trained Band and Trained Band Horse consisted of 480 foot (280 muskets, 200 corslets (body armour, signifying pikemen)) and 90 horse.

=== Civil wars ===
For the Second Bishops' War in 1640, Herefordshire was ordered to muster 300 trained bandsmen and march them to Newcastle upon Tyne. Once again many of those sent on this unpopular service would have been untrained replacements and conscripts.

Control of the TBs was one of the major points of dispute between Charles I and Parliament that led to the First English Civil War. When open warfare broke out, neither side made much use of the TBs beyond securing the county armouries for their own full-time troops who would serve anywhere in the country, many of whom were former trained bandsmen, or using the TBs as auxiliary units for garrisons.

As Parliament tightened its grip on the country after the Second English Civil War, it passed new Militia Acts in 1648 and 1650 that replaced lords lieutenant with county commissioners appointed by Parliament or the Council of State. From now on, the term 'Trained Band' began to disappear in most counties. Under the Commonwealth and Protectorate, the militia received pay when called out, and operated alongside the New Model Army to control the country. Many militia regiments were called out in 1651 during the Scottish invasion (the Worcester campaign) and the Herefordshires were part of a concentration ordered to defend Gloucester.

== Restoration Militia ==
After the Restoration the English Militia was re-established by the Militia Act 1661 (13 Cha. 2 St. 1. c. 6) under the control of the king's lords lieutenants, the men to be selected by ballot. This was popularly seen as the 'Constitutional Force' to counterbalance a 'Standing Army' tainted by association with the New Model Army that had supported Cromwell's military dictatorship, and almost the whole burden of home defence and internal security was entrusted to the militia. Care was taken that they were politically reliable: in 1666 the Hereford Town Militia was purged of men who had refused to pay the hearth tax, and the remainder of the company resisted the disarming of these men.

They militia were frequently called out during the reign of King Charles II; for example, the Herefordshire Militia were embodied in 1666 during the Second Anglo-Dutch War when invasion seemed to threaten, and were put on notice to be embodied again the following year. The Herefordshires were called out during the Monmouth Rebellion and were ordered to march with the Gloucestershire and Monmouthshire regiments to secure Bristol, a likely objective for the West Country rebels. However, they did not see any action.

By 1691 the counties were beginning to clothe their militiamen in uniforms, and the Earl of Macclesfield as Lord Lieutenant of Herefordshire wrote to his deputies to tell them so, and hoping that they were doing the same. There was a national militia muster in 1697 when the Regular Army was being run down after the Peace of Ryswick; however, the return for Herefordshire does not appear to have survived.

The Militia passed into virtual abeyance during the long peace after the Treaty of Utrecht in 1712, although some were called out during the Jacobite risings of 1715 and 1745.

== 1757 reforms ==
Under threat of French invasion during the Seven Years' War the Militia Act 1757 (30 Geo. 2. c. 25) reorganised the county militia regiments, the men being conscripted by means of parish ballots (paid substitutes were permitted) to serve for three years. In peacetime they assembled for 28 days' annual training. There was a property qualification for officers, who were commissioned by the lord lieutenant. An adjutant and drill sergeants were to be provided to each regiment from the Regular Army, and arms and accoutrements would be supplied when the county had secured 60 per cent of its quota of recruits.

Herefordshire's quota was set at 480 men. The Midlands counties were not directly threatened with invasion and were generally unenthusiastic about forming their militia regiments; Herefordshire's was not formed until 7 September 1762, and its arms were listed as being ready in November. However, peace negotiations were under way by then, and the regiment was not embodied for service. After 1762 the militia carried out their 28 days' annual training.

=== American War of Independence ===
The militia was called out on 31 March 1778 when Britain was threatened with invasion by the Americans' allies, France and Spain. This meant that the Herefordshire regiment was embodied for permanent service for the first time. The routine militia duties included manning coastal garrisons, escorting and guarding prisoners of war, riot control, anti-smuggling patrols and attending summer training camps. In the summer of 1780 the Herefordshire regiment was stationed at Plymouth. On 12 August there was a serious riot brought on by a quarrel at a 'disorderly house' in the Dock area between some of the Brecknockshire Militia and two black musicians of the 1st Somerset Militia band. A large mob formed and the Somersets armed with bayonets and assisted by the Herefordshires attempted to storm the Brecknocks' lines, despite the efforts of the officers. The mob surged towards Stoke Church, where the picquet guard of the 97th Foot was ordered to fire, killing two and wounding nine. This and the persuasion of the officers quelled the trouble.

A peace treaty having been agreed in Paris, the militia was disembodied in March 1783. From 1784 to 1792 the militia were supposed to assemble for 28 days' annual training, even though to save money only two-thirds of the men were called out each year. In 1786 the number of permanent non-commissioned officers (NCOs) was reduced.

=== French Revolutionary War ===
The militia had already been called out before Revolutionary France declared war on Britain on 1 February 1793. By 8 August 1793 the Herefordshires, with 8 companies, were stationed at Bristol.

The French Revolutionary Wars saw a new phase for the English militia: they were embodied for a whole generation, and became regiments of full-time professional soldiers (though restricted to service in the British Isles), which the regular Army increasingly saw as a prime source of recruits. Meanwhile, their traditional local defence duties were taken over by the Volunteers and mounted Yeomanry.

Wartime food shortages led to bread riots. The militia were used for riot control, but in Chichester in April 1795 some of the Herefordshires joined the crowd of townsmen and people from the nearby country in trying to fix lower prices. They marched out to an adjoining village and forced the farmer to bring his grain to market next day and sell it cheaply.

=== Supplementary Militia ===
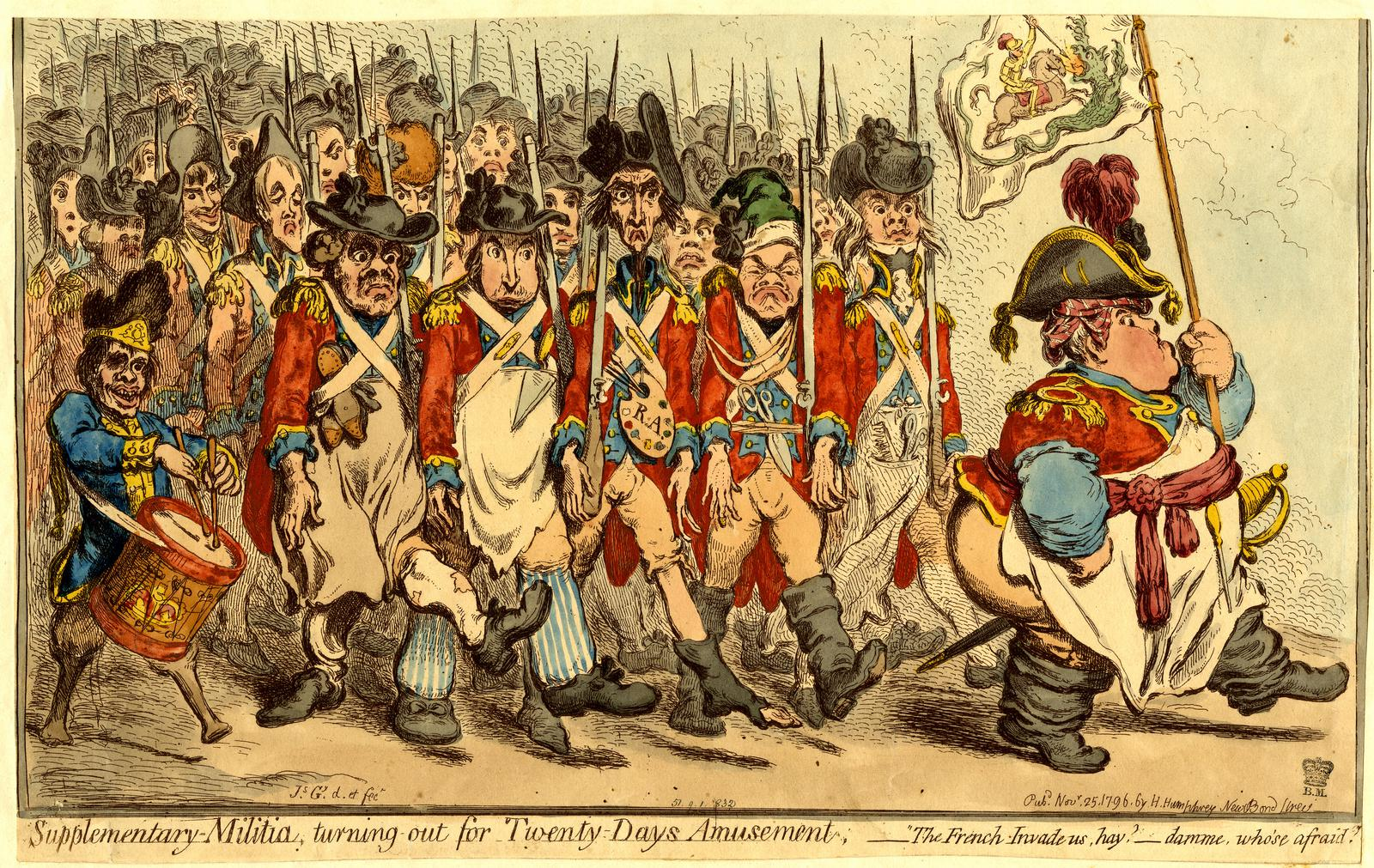
Supplementary-Militia, turning-out for Twenty Days Amusement: 1796 caricature by James Gillray

In an attempt to have as many men as possible under arms for home defence in order to release regulars, the Government created the Supplementary Militia in 1796, a compulsory levy of men to be trained in their spare time, and to be incorporated into the Militia in emergency. The lieutenancies were required to carry out 20 days' initial training as soon as possible. Herefordshire's quota was increased by an additional 662 men, still within the single regiment, which had to train them in the county. The supplementaries were embodied in 1798, which meant that additional officers had to be found. However, the invasion threat having passed, the supplementary militia was stood down in 1799, the discharged men being encouraged to volunteer for the regular army. By 1802 the total quota for Herefordshire had been reduced to 502 men, closer to the original number.

=== Irish Rebellion ===
In the summer of 1798 the Irish Rebellion became more serious, with the French sending help to the rebels. The Herefordshire was one of the militia regiments that volunteered to serve in Ireland and once the necessary legislation was passed it was among 13 regiments whose offer was accepted. The regiment marched from its station at Canterbury to embark in July, but the move was countermanded. Instead the Herefordshires went to Shorncliffe Camp and trained as part of a light brigade. They were then brigaded with the West Kent Militia and ordered to requisition vehicles for a forced march, the officers in Postchaises and the men in waggons, to Milford Haven, where they finally embarking for Ireland. The Herefords were part of the overwhelming force under the commander-in-chief, Marquess Cornwallis, that compelled the surrender of Gen Humbert's Franco-Irish army. The remaining rebel parties were suppressed over the following months. At the end of the year the militia regiments were asked if they would extend their service in Ireland, but with the crisis over they were not enthusiastic to do so.

Afterwards, the Herefordshire was one of four militia regiments granted the Irish harp as an emblem on their Regimental colour for their distinguished service in Ireland in 1798–9. The regiment was also designated the Herefordshire Fusiliers Militia from 1798.

The regiments returned to England and resumed their routine duties. Hostilities ended with the Treaty of Amiens in 1802 and the militia were disembodied.

=== Napoleonic Wars ===
John Bateman, 2nd Viscount Bateman, lord-lieutenant of Herefordshire since 1748, died in 1802. His successor, George Capel-Coningsby, 5th Earl of Essex, took over direct command of the Herefordshire Militia, vowing to eradicate the corrupt practices in the regiment that Bateman had allowed. The Peace of Amiens did not last long, and the militia were re-embodied in 1803. By 1805 all the officers of the Herefordshire Militia had been newly commissioned or promoted by the Earl of Essex since the re-embodiment. On 25 February Sir George Cornewall, 2nd Baronet, was appointed as colonel of the regiment (he was he was also major-commandant of the Hereford Volunteer Cavalry and was soon to be Member of Parliament (MP) for Herefordshire). Thomas Foley (probably Thomas Foley (1778–1822), MP for Droitwich and later Herefordshire) was his lieutenant-colonel. John Berington and Thomas Bowyear were the majors, and among the captains were George Rodney, 3rd Baron Rodney (later Lt-Col of the North Hampshire Militia) and his younger brother the Hon James Rodney.

During 1805 the regiment was at Ipswich, where it took part in a grand review on Rushmere Heath before the Commander-in-Chief, the Duke of York. That summer, when Napoleon was massing his 'Army of England' at Boulogne for a projected invasion, the Herefordshire Militia was stationed at Dover. On 1 September 1805, with 571 men in 10 companies under the command of Lt-Col Thomas Foley, it was in Dover Castle as part of Maj-Gen Lord Forbes's militia brigade.

In 1808–09 the regiment was officially listed as the Royal Herefordshire Militia, but this honorific title seems not to have lasted for long.

=== Local militia ===
While the regular militia were the mainstay of national defence during the Napoleonic Wars, they were supplemented from 1808 by the local militia, which were part-time and only to be used within their own districts. These were raised to counter the declining numbers of Volunteers, and if their ranks could not be filled voluntarily the militia ballot was employed. The local militia suffered from disciplinary problems and at the first annual training in 1809, there were serious disturbances in the Archenfield Local Militia of Herefordshire, which had replaced the Archenfield Volunteers.

=== France ===
In November 1813 the militia were invited to volunteer for limited overseas service, primarily for garrison duties in Europe. Seven officers and 210 other ranks (ORs) of the Herefordshires volunteered under Lt-Col John Berington. Although not all of the volunteers eventually went, they formed part of the 3rd Provisional Battalion commanded by Col Sir Watkin Williams-Wynn of the Royal Denbigh Rifles:

3rd Provisional Battalion

- Royal Denbigh Rifles – 135 all ranks
- Derbyshire Militia – 125 all ranks
- Herefordshire Militia – 110 all ranks
- Westmorland Militia – 162 all ranks
- 2nd West Yorkshire Militia – 349 all ranks

The battalion assembled at Chester and marched to Portsmouth where the Militia Brigade under the Marquess of Buckingham was assembling. The brigade embarked on 10–11 March 1814 and three days later arrived at Bordeaux, which had just been occupied by the Earl of Dalhousie's 7th Division. It did not take part in the Battle of Toulouse on 10 April, but carried out garrison and occupation duties as the war was ending. The 3rd Provisional Battalion was quartered in villages along the River Gironde. The brigade did not form part of the Army of Occupation after the abdication of Napoleon and returned to Plymouth in June.

Some of the militia remained embodied during Napoleon's brief return to power in 1815, which ended at the Battle of Waterloo. The Herefordshires were finally disembodied in May 1816.

=== Long peace ===
After Waterloo there was another long peace. Although ballots were still held, the regiments were rarely assembled for training and the permanent staffs of sergeants and drummers (who were occasionally used to maintain public order) were progressively reduced. The ballot was suspended by the Militia Act 1829

Lords lieutenant continued to appoint officers to the disembodied militia. John Somers-Cocks, 2nd Earl Somers, of Eastnor Castle, Lord Lieutenant of Herefordshire and former MP for Hereford, was himself commissioned as colonel of the Herefordshire Militia on 16 January 1836. His lieutenant-colonel, commissioned a month later, was J.C. Scudamore. In 1845–46 there was an effort to replace elderly members of the permanent staff and to appoint a few younger officers from the county gentry, though they had no duties to perform. A number of new officers were commissioned to the Herefords in 1846: Sir John Walsham, 1st Baronet, became the major, while Sir Velters Cornewall, 4th Baronet, grandson of the former colonel, and a younger John Berington were among the captains. As late as 1850 three of the officers were still listed as half-pay lieutenants of the 3rd Provisional Battalion.

== 1852 reforms ==
The Militia of the United Kingdom was revived by the Militia Act 1852, enacted during a renewed period of international tension. As before, units were raised and administered on a county basis, and filled by voluntary enlistment (although conscription by means of the Militia Ballot might be used if the counties failed to meet their quotas). Training was for 56 days on enlistment, then for 21–28 days per year, during which the men received full army pay. The Militia was transferred from the Home Office to the War Office (WO). Under the Act, militia units could be embodied by Royal Proclamation for full-time home defence service in three circumstances:

1. 'Whenever a state of war exists between Her Majesty and any foreign power'.
2. 'In all cases of invasion or upon imminent danger thereof'.
3. 'In all cases of rebellion or insurrection'.

New officers, many ex-Regulars, were appointed to the revived regiments. Unusually, a significant number of existing officers, mainly appointed in 1846, were carried over in the Hereford Militia. Earl Somers had died in 1852 and been replaced by Philip James Yorke, a former officer in the Scots Fusiliers Guards. In March 1853 a group of new officers was commissioned, with George Rushout, MP, a former captain in the 1st Life Guards, as lieutenant-colonel; Sir John Walsham remained major.

The Crimean War having broken out and a large expeditionary force sent overseas, the militia were called out for home defence: the Herefordshire regiment was embodied in December 1854. It remained at Hereford until January 1856, when it moved to Aldershot Camp. It was disembodied in June that year after the Treaty of Paris.

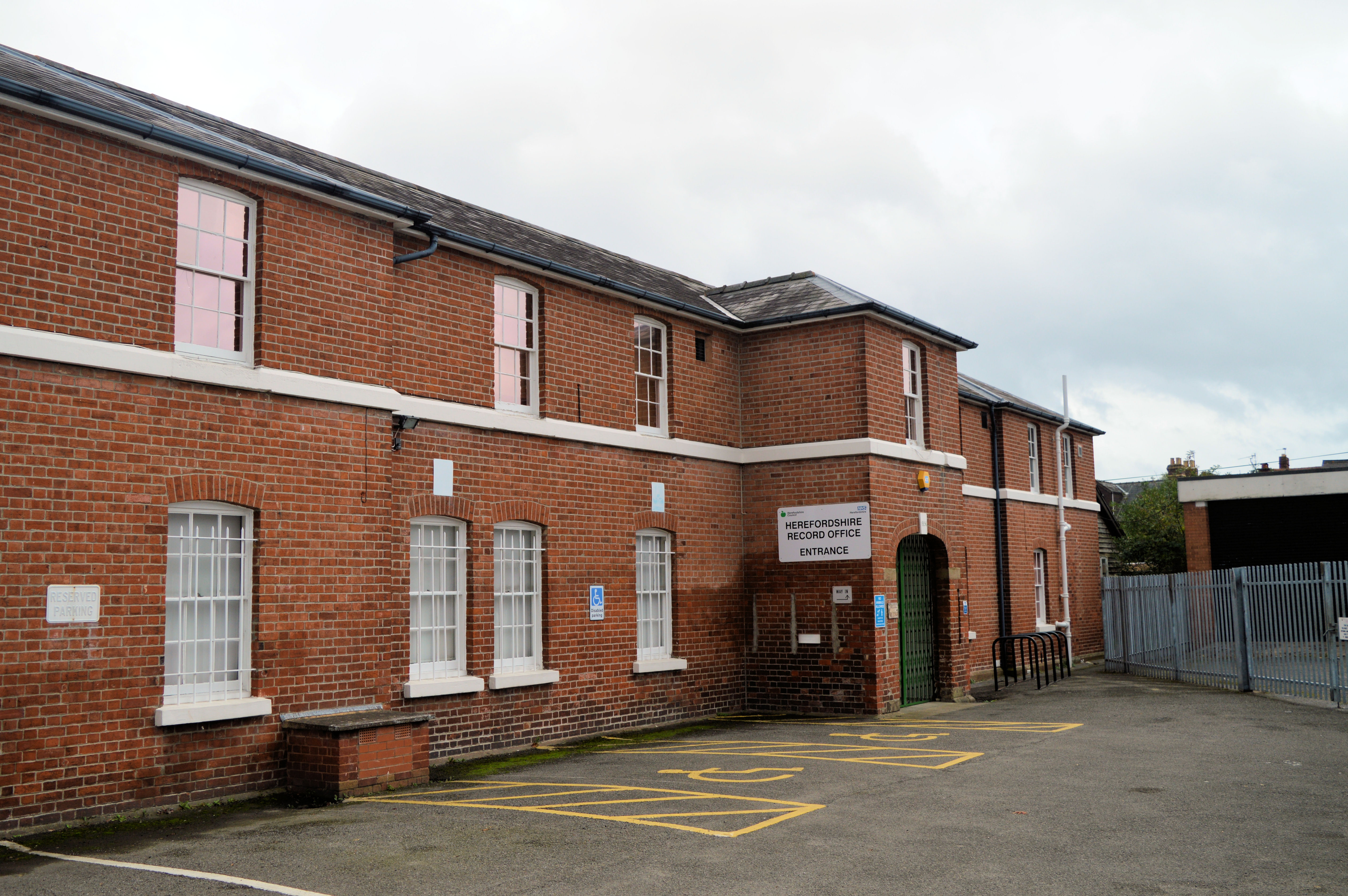
Harold Street Drill Hall in Hereford, the old militia barracks

The regiment completed construction of the Harold Street drill hall in Hereford as its permanent barracks about this time.

The rank of colonel was abolished in the militia after the 1852 reforms, so George Rushout, who succeeded as 3rd Lord Northwick in 1859, became Lt-Col Commandant. In 1864 William Bateman-Hanbury, 2nd Baron Bateman, Lord Lieutenant of Herefordshire, was appointed Honorary Colonel of the regiment. (Note: Not to be confused with the personal honorary rank of colonel awarded to most militia lt-cols-commandant.)

Over the following years the regiment mustered each year for 21 or 27 days' training. The militia now came under the WO rather than their lords lieutenant and had a large cadre of permanent staff (about 30). Around a third of the recruits and many young officers went on to join the Regular Army. The Militia Reserve introduced in 1867 consisted of present and former militiamen who undertook to serve overseas in case of war.

== Cardwell and Childers reforms ==
Under the Localisation of the Forces scheme introduced by the Cardwell Reforms, Regular infantry battalions were linked together and assigned to particular counties, while the county Militia and Rifle Volunteers were affiliated to them. Sub-District No 22 (Counties of Worcester and Hereford) comprised:

- 29th (Worcestershire) Regiment of Foot
- 36th (Herefordshire) Regiment of Foot
- Worcestershire Militia
- Herefordshire Militia
- 1st Administrative Battalion, Worcestershire Rifle Volunteer Corps
- 2nd Administrative Battalion, Worcestershire Rifle Volunteer Corps
- 1st Administrative Battalion, Herefordshire Rifle Volunteer Corps

At this time the Worcestershire was the largest militia regiment in the country, with 12 companies and more than 200 more men enrolled than any other regiment. Together with three other large regiments it was permitted to form a second battalion of 6 companies, which came into existence at Worcester on 13 June 1874.

Following the Cardwell Reforms a mobilisation scheme began to appear in the Army List from December 1875. This assigned Regular and Militia units to places in an order of battle of corps, divisions and brigades for the 'Active Army', even though these formations were entirely theoretical, with no staff or services assigned. The Hereford Militia were assigned to 2nd Brigade of 2nd Division, V Corps. The division would have mustered at Warminster in Wiltshire in time of war.

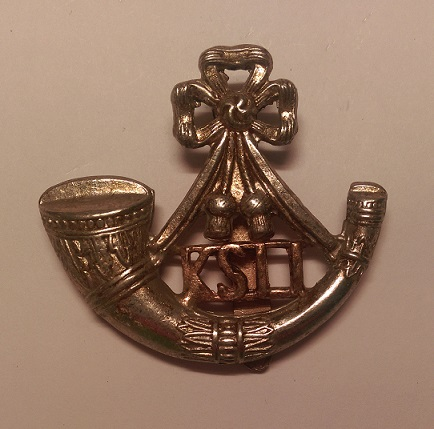
KSLI cap badge

=== 4th King's Shropshire Light Infantry ===
The 1881 Childers Reforms took Cardwell's scheme a stage further, the linked regular regiments combining into single two-battalion regiments. The 29th and 36th therefore became the Worcestershire Regiment on 1 July 1881. The scheme envisaged each county regiment having two militia battalions: because the Worcestershires already had a double battalion, they became the 3rd and 4th Battalions, while the Herefordshire Militia and Volunteers were instead linked with the King's Shropshire Light Infantry (KSLI):

- 1st Battalion, KSLI – ex 53rd (Shropshire) Regiment of Foot
- 2nd Battalion, KSLI - ex 85th (King's Light Infantry) Regiment of Foot
- 3rd (Shropshire Militia) Battalion, KSLI
- 4th (Hereford Militia) Battalion, KSLI (Note: Replacing the Royal Montgomeryshire Militia, initially designated as 4th Bn KSLI.)
- 1st Shropshire Volunteer Battalion, KSLI
- 2nd Shropshire Volunteer Battalion, KSLI
- 1st Hereford Volunteer Battalion, KSLI

=== Second Boer War ===
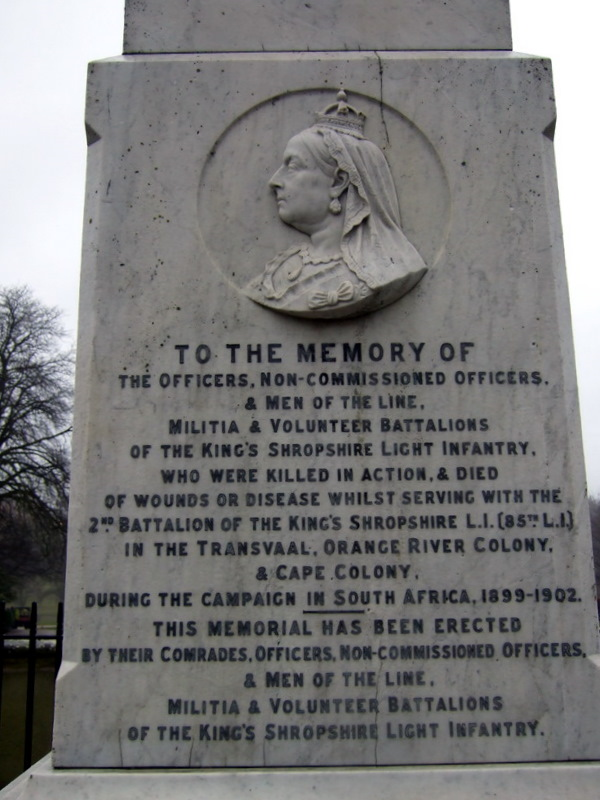
The KSLI Boer War Memorial on St Chad's Terrace, Shrewsbury

With the bulk of the Regular Army (reinforced by the Militia Reserve) serving in South Africa during the Second Boer War, the Militia were called out for home defence. The 4th Bn KSLI was embodied from 12 December 1899 to 1 November 1900.

Neither militia battalion of the KSLI served in South Africa during the war, but their militia reservists did, and there is a war memorial on St Chad's Terrace in Shrewsbury dedicated to the men of the 'line, militia and volunteer battalions' of the regiment who died on service with the 2nd Bn KSLI during the war.

=== Disbandment ===
After the Boer War, the future of the Militia was called into question. There were moves to reform the Auxiliary Forces (Militia, Yeomanry and Volunteers) to take their place in the six Army Corps proposed by the Secretary of State for War, St John Brodrick. However, little of Brodrick's scheme was carried out.

Under the more sweeping Haldane Reforms of 1908, the Militia was replaced by the Special Reserve (SR), a semi-professional force whose role was to provide reinforcement drafts for Regular units serving overseas in wartime, rather like the earlier Militia Reserve. The Volunteers became part of the new Territorial Force (TF).

Not all the 4th battalions survived to be transferred to the SR, and the 4th (Hereford Militia) Bn, KSLI, was one of those that was disbanded, on 15 July 1908. (The two Shropshire VBs were amalgamated and renumbered as the new 4th Bn KSLI when they transferred to the TF, while the Hereford VB became a freestanding wholly TF regiment at the Harold St former militia barracks.)

== Commanders ==
Commanding officers of the Herefordshire Militia included:

- Col Sir George Cornewall, 2nd Baronet, 25 February 1805
- Col John Somers-Cocks, 2nd Earl Somers 16 January 1836
- Col Philip James Yorke, formerly Scots Fusilier Guards, 13 July 1852
- Lt-Col George Rushout, 3rd Baron Northwick, formerly 1st Life Guards, 1 March 1853; later lt-col commandant
- Lt-Col Thomas Symonds, promoted 1 October 1862
- Lt-Col John Berington, promoted 10 April 1866
- Lt-Col Richard Webb, promoted 5 May 1884
- Lt-Col Hugh Williams, promoted 17 September 1892
- Lt-Col E.S. Lucas, promoted 5 April 1899
- Lt-Col Gilbert Bourne. promoted 9 May 1903
- Lt-Col Charles Shipley, promoted 29 August 1906

=== Honorary colonels ===
- William Bateman-Hanbury, 2nd Baron Bateman, Lord Lieutenant of Herefordshire, appointed 19 May 1864, died 1901)
- Lieutenant-General Sir Edward Hopton, Deputy Lieutenant of Herefordshire, appointed 6 June 1903

== Heritage & ceremonial ==
=== Uniforms & insignia ===
When the Herefordshire Militia was first embodied in 1778 its uniform was given as red with apple green facings. However, later army lists show the facings as 'goslin (sic) green': 'gosling green' as a facing colour was long associated with the Northumberland Fusiliers and was taken to be a yellowish- or brownish-green like the down of a young goose. As part of the King's Shropshire Light Infantry the battalion wore blue facings appropriate to a 'Royal' regiment.

The badge of the Herefordshire Militia on the helmet plates of 1878–81 and men's forage caps of 1874–81 was the coat of arms of the City of Hereford. The buttons carried an apple, which was also worn as a collar and cap badge. The battalion adopted KSLI badges in 1881.

=== Precedence ===
During the War of American Independence the counties were given an order of precedence determined by ballot each year. For the Herefordshire Militia the positions were:

- 18th on 1 June 1778
- 33rd on 12 May 1779
- 5th on 6 May 1780
- 15th on 28 April 1781
- 18th on 7 May 1782

The militia order of precedence balloted for in 1793 (Herefordshire was 25th) remained in force throughout the French Revolutionary War. Another ballot for precedence took place in 1803 at the start of the Napoleonic War, when Herefordshire was 61st. This order continued until 1833, when the King drew the lots for individual regiments. The regiments raised before the peace of 1763 took the first 47 places; the next 22 places went to the regiments raised between the peace of 1763 and the peace of 1783: Herefordshire was placed at 52nd. The list was revised in 1855, with mainly minor changes, and it is not clear why the Herefordshire was given a precedence as low as 110th. Most militia regiments ignored the numeral.

== See also ==
- Trained Bands
- Militia (English)
- Militia (Great Britain)
- Militia (United Kingdom)
- King's Shropshire Light Infantry
