= General Buchanan =

General Buchanan may refer to:

- Ferdinand Buchanan (1888–1967), South African Army general
- Henry Buchanan (British Army officer) (1830–1903), British Army lieutenant general
- Jeffrey S. Buchanan (fl. 1980s–2010s), U.S. Army lieutenant general
- Kenneth Buchanan (1880–1973), British Army major general
- Robert C. Buchanan (1811–1878), U.S. Army brevet major general
