= Eastern Command (United Kingdom) =

- Active: 1793–1968
- Country: United Kingdom
- Branch: British Army
- Type: Command
- Garrison/HQ: Colchester (1866–1905); London (1905–1939); Hounslow (1939–1941, 1945–1968); Luton Hoo (1941–1945); Wilton Park (1954–1957)

Commanders
- Notable commanders: Marquess Cornwallis

Eastern Command was a Command of the British Army.

== Nineteenth century ==
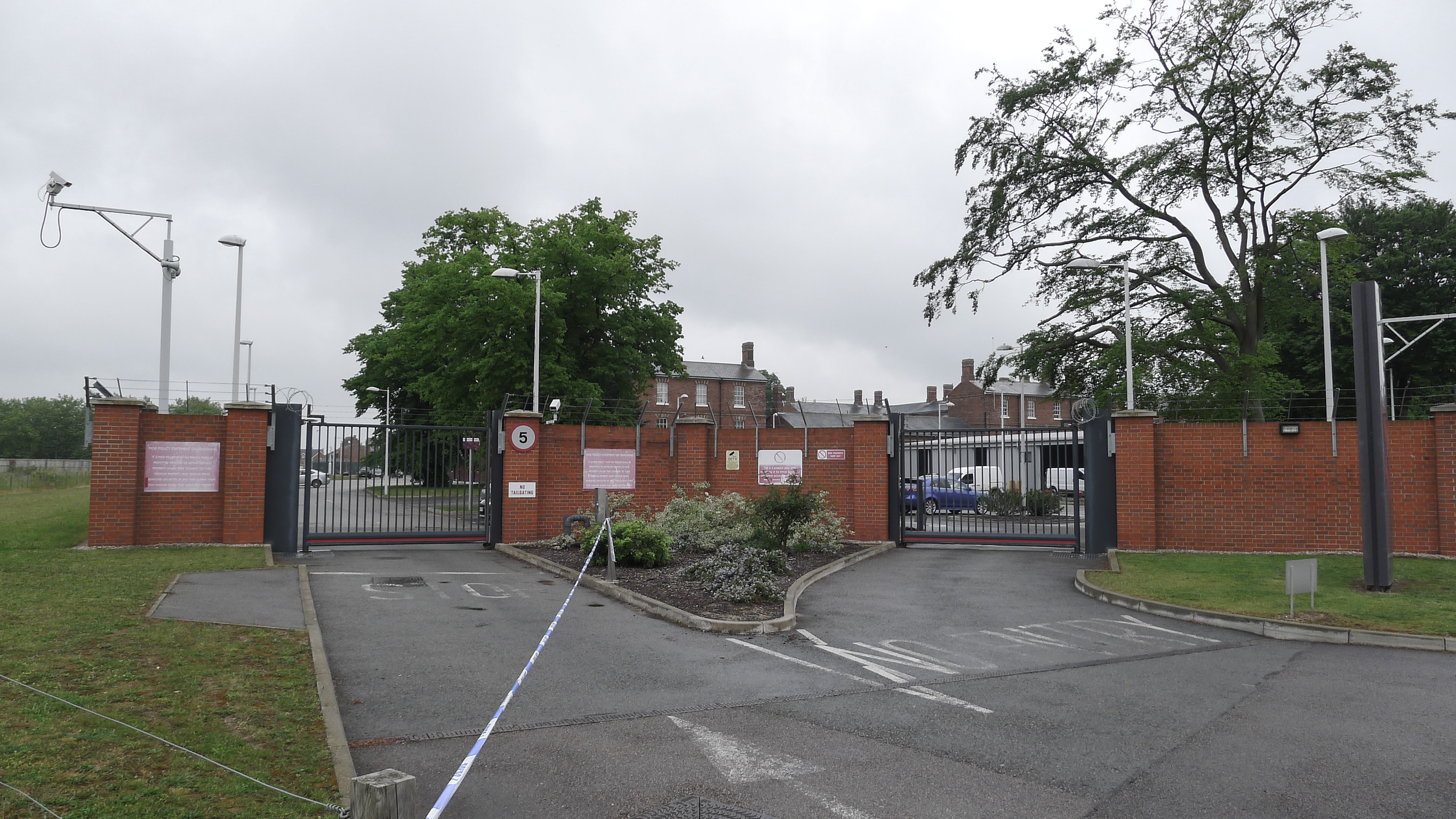
Colchester Garrison, command headquarters from 1866 to 1905

Great Britain was divided into military districts on the outbreak of war with France in 1793. In the first half of the 19th century the command included the counties of Essex, Suffolk, Norfolk, Cambridgeshire, Huntingdonshire and Hertfordshire. It was based in Colchester.

Disbanded after the Napoleonic Wars, the Eastern District Command was re-created in 1866 and was based at Flagstaff House in Colchester. In January 1876 a ‘Mobilization Scheme for the forces in Great Britain and Ireland’ was published, with the ‘Active Army’ divided into eight army corps based on the District Commands. 1st Corps was to be formed within Eastern Command, based in Colchester. This scheme disappeared in 1881, when the districts were retitled ‘District Commands’.

== Twentieth century ==
The 1901 Army Estimates introduced by St John Brodrick allowed for six army corps based on six regional commands. As outlined in a paper published in 1903, IV Corps was to be formed in a reconstituted Eastern Command, with HQ at London. Lieutenant General Lord Grenfell was appointed acting General Officer Commanding-in-Chief (GOCinC) of IV Corps in April 1903.

=== First World War ===
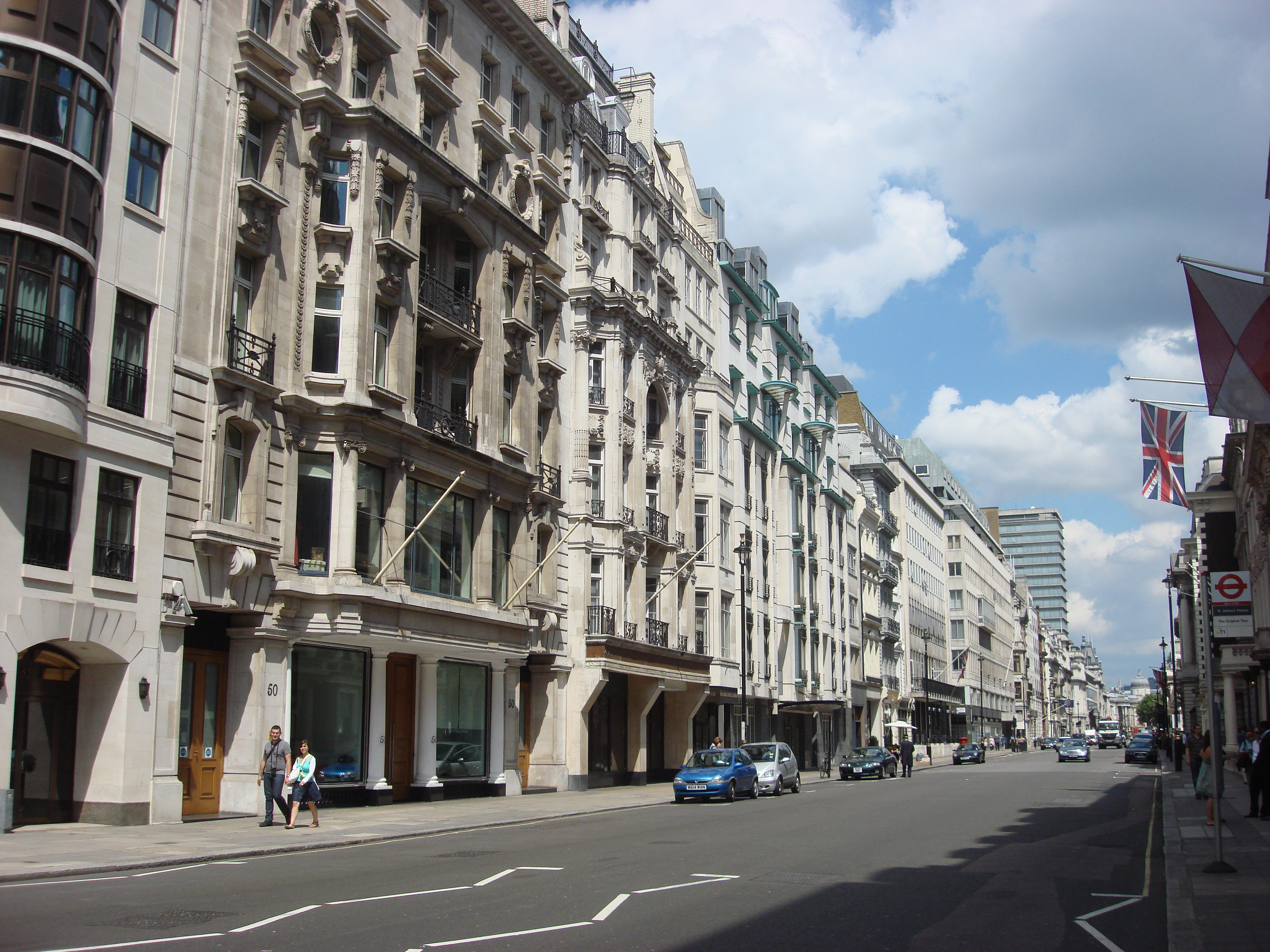
50 Pall Mall (second building on the left), command headquarters during the First World War

Army Order No 324, issued on 21 August 1914, authorised the formation of a 'New Army' of six Divisions, manned by volunteers who had responded to Earl Kitchener's appeal (hence the First New Army was known as 'K1'). Each division was to be under the administration of one of the Home Commands, and Eastern Command formed what became the 12th (Eastern) Division. It was followed by 18th (Eastern) Division of K2 in September 1914. During the First World War, HQ Eastern Command was in London: initially at Horse Guards, then (from February 1916) at 50 Pall Mall, London; in 1919 it moved to 41 Queen's Gardens, Bayswater.

=== Second World War ===
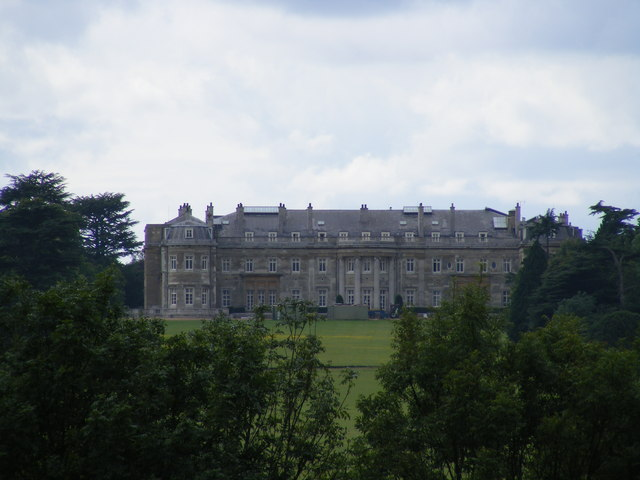
Luton Hoo, command headquarters from 1941 to 1945

At the outbreak of the Second World War, the headquarters was again located at Horse Guards, but by October 1939 it had moved to Hounslow Barracks. At that time Regular Troops reporting to the Command included 4th Infantry Division. In 1941, the Command relocated to Luton Hoo in Bedfordshire. During the war, the 76th Infantry (Reserve) Division was assigned to the command as its training formation.

From 1 December 41 to 30 July 1943 36th Tank Brigade was located in Eastern Command. It disbanded without going overseas.

=== Post War ===
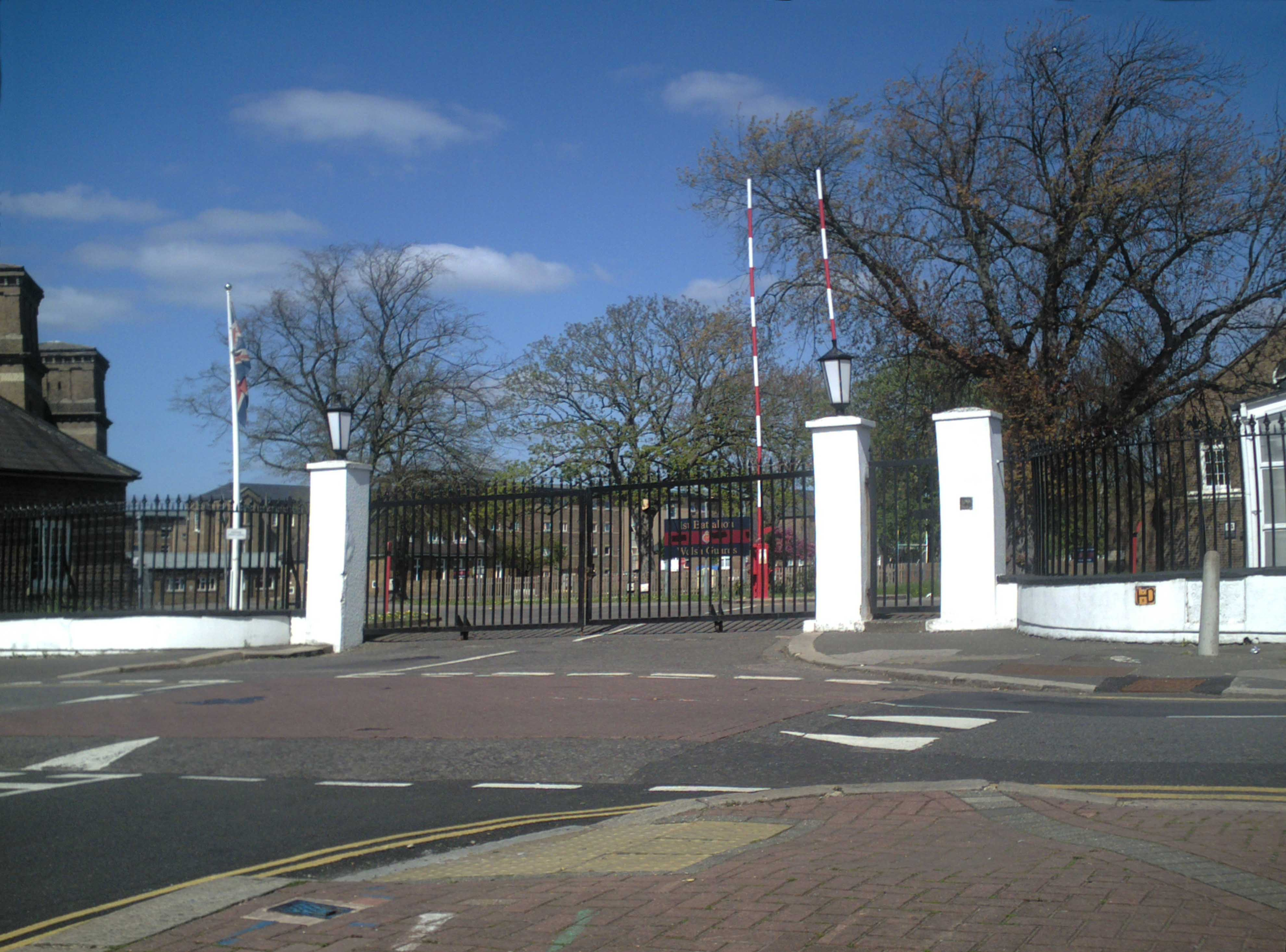
Cavalry Barracks, Hounslow, command headquarters from 1939 to 1941 and 1945 to 1968

After the War the command headquarters moved back to Cavalry Barracks, Hounslow in north London. When the Territorial Army was reformed in 1947, 54th (East Anglian) was not reestablished as a field division, but 161st Infantry Brigade was reformed as an independent infantry brigade in Eastern Command. From 1947 to 1956 101 Coast Brigade supervised RA TA coastal defence regiments, until the disestablishment of all coastal artillery.

In 1952 the Command was reported to include 48 Field Regiment RA, Kirkee Barracks, Colchester; 49 Field Regiment RA, Canterbury; 47 Coast Regiment RA, Dover; 36 Army Engineer Regiment, Maidstone; and 1st Battalion, The Devonshire Regiment, at Colchester.

In 1954 a single-storey blockhouse was built at Wilton Park in Beaconsfield, to provide a protected Eastern Command headquarters for use in the event of war; however in 1957 this provision was superseded by plans for Regional Seats of Government. In 1968, Eastern Command was dissolved and merged into a reconfigured Southern Command. The new HQ Southern Command was established at Hounslow, and the last GOCinC Eastern Command took over as GOCinC Southern Command. In 1972, Southern Command, together with the other two geographic commands, was merged with Army Strategic Command to form a new command: UK Land Forces (UKLF).

== Command Training Centres ==
Between 1941 and 1943, each regional command of the British Army formed at-least one training centre which trained those recruits preparing to move overseas. The centres which were based within the command were:

- Essex Infantry Training Centre, Warley Barracks, became No.1 Training Centre on 14 August 1941 — affiliated with the City of London Regiment (Royal Fusiliers) and Essex Regiment
  - From 2 July 1941 included No.51 Physical Training Wing
- Norfolk Infantry Training Centre, Britannia Barracks, became No.2 Training Centre on 14 August 1941 — affiliated with the Royal Norfolk Regiment and Northamptonshire Regiment
  - From 2 July 1941 included No.52 Physical Training Wing
- Suffolk Infantry Training Centre, Gibraltar Barracks, became No.3 Training Centre on 14 August 1941 — affiliated with the Suffolk Regiment and Bedfordshire and Hertfordshire Regiment
  - From 2 July 1941 included No.53 Physical Training Wing

== General Officers Commanding-in-Chief ==
GOCs and GOCinCs have included:
General Officer Commanding Eastern District

- 1795 – 1800 General Sir William Howe
- 1801 – 1802 General the Marquess Cornwallis
- 1802 Lieutenant General William Grinfield
- 1802 – 1805 Major General Sir James Craig
- 1805 – 1806 Major General Sir James Pulteney
- 1806 – 1814 Lieutenant General Lord Chatham
- 1815 – 1819 Major General Sir John Byng

- 1866 – 1869 Major General Thomas Tidy
- 1869 – 1870 Major General Richard Farren
- 1870 – 1872 Lieutenant General Freeman Murray
- 1872 Lieutenant General the Hon. Alexander Hamilton-Gordon
- 1872 – 1877 Major General Sir Edward Greathed
- 1877 – 1878 Lieutenant General Sir Richard Kelly
- 1878 – 1882 Lieutenant General William Pollexfen Radcliffe
- 1882 Major General the Hon. Sir Henry Clifford
- 1882 – 1886 Lieutenant General Robert White
- 1886 – 1889 Major General Sir Evelyn Wood
- 1889 – 1892 Major General Henry Buchanan
- 1892 – 1896 Lieutenant General John Glyn
- 1896 – 1898 Major General Charles Burnett
- 1898 – 1899 Major General Sir William Gatacre
- 1899 – 1900 Major General Henry Abadie
- 1900 – 1903 Major General Sir William Gatacre (also commander 10th Division and 19th Brigade from 1 April 1903)
- 1903 – 1904 Major General Herbert Plumer
- 1904 – 1905 Major General Arthur Wynne

10th Division was renamed 6th Division in 1905.

Commander 4th Army Corps

Home District at Horse Guards, Eastern District at Colchester, Thames District at Chatham and Woolwich District were grouped under 4th Army Corps in 1903.

- 1 April 1903: General the Lord Grenfell
- 6 June 1904: General the Lord Methuen

4th Army Corps was renamed Eastern Command 1 June 1905.

General Officer Commanding Eastern Command

- 1905 – 1908 Lieutenant General Lord Methuen
- 1908 – 1912 Lieutenant General Sir Arthur Paget
- 1912 – 1914 Lieutenant General Sir James Grierson
- 1914 – 1915 Lieutenant General Sir Charles Woollcombe
- 1915 – 1916 Lieutenant General Sir Leslie Rundle
- 1916 – 1917 Lieutenant General Sir James Wolfe Murray
- 1917 – 1918 Lieutenant General Sir Henry Wilson
- 1918 General Sir William Robertson
- 1918 – 1919 Lieutenant General Sir Charles Woollcombe
- 1919 – 1923 General Lord Horne
- 1923 – 1926 Lieutenant General Sir George Milne
- 1926 – 1927 Lieutenant General Sir Walter Braithwaite
- 1927 – 1931 General Sir Robert Whigham
- 1931 – 1933 General Sir Webb Gillman
- 1933 – 1936 Lieutenant General Sir Cyril Deverell
- 1936 – 1938 Lieutenant General Sir Edmund Ironside
- 1938 – 1941 Lieutenant General Sir Guy Williams
- 1941 – 1942 Lieutenant General Laurence Carr
- April 1942 – August 1942 Lieutenant General Sir Kenneth Anderson
- September 1942 – January 1944 Lieutenant General Sir James Gammell
- January 1944 – December 1944 Lieutenant General Sir Kenneth Anderson
- December 1944 – August 1945 Lieutenant General Sir Alan Cunningham
- 1945 – 1947 Lieutenant General Sir Oliver Leese
- 1947 – 1950 General Sir Evelyn Barker
- 1950 – 1952 General Sir Gerald Templer
- 1952 – 1953 Lieutenant General Sir George Erskine
- 1953 – 1954 Lieutenant General Sir Geoffrey Bourne
- 1954 – 1956 Lieutenant General Sir Francis Festing
- 1956 – 1959 Lieutenant General Sir Charles Coleman
- 1959 – 1960 Lieutenant General Sir James Cassels
- 1960 – 1961 General Sir Gerald Lathbury
- 1962 – 1965 Lieutenant General Sir Roderick McLeod
- 1965 – 1966 Lieutenant General Sir George Cole
- 1966 – 1968 Lieutenant General Sir David Peel Yates

== Sources ==
- Forty, George (2013) [1998]. Companion to the British Army 1939–1945 (ePub ed.). New York: Spellmount. ISBN 978-0-7509-5139-5.
- Jeffery, Keith (2006). Field Marshal Sir Henry Wilson: A Political Soldier. Oxford University Press. ISBN 978-0-19-820358-2.
- Joslen, H. F. (2003) [1960]. Orders of Battle: Second World War, 1939–1945. Uckfield, East Sussex: Naval and Military Press. ISBN 978-1-84342-474-1.
- Pevsner, Nikolaus (1965). Essex (Pevsner Architectural Guides: Buildings of England). Yale University Press. ISBN 978-0300096019.
- Wickwire, Franklin and Mary (1980). Cornwallis: The Imperial Years. Chapel Hill: University of North Carolina Press. ISBN 0-8078-1387-7.
