= William Forbes Gatacre =

British Army general (1843–1906)

Lieutenant-General Sir William Forbes Gatacre KCB DSO KStJ
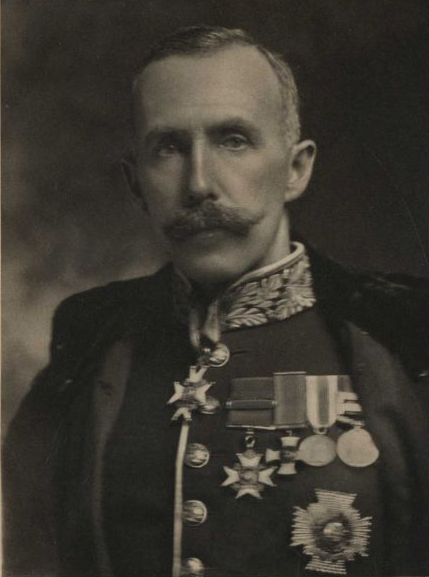
- Born: 3 December 1843; Herbertshire Castle, Stirlingshire, Scotland
- Died: 18 January 1906 (aged 62); Gambella, Abyssinia
- Military career
- Allegiance: United Kingdom
- Branch: British Army
- Service years: 1862–1904
- Rank: Lieutenant-General
- Unit: 77th Foot
- Commands: Eastern District
- Conflicts: Third Burmese War; Hazara Expedition (1888); Chitral Expedition; Reconquest of the Sudan; Battle of Atbara; Battle of Omdurman; Second Boer War; Battle of Stormberg
- Awards: Knight Commander of the Order of the Bath; Distinguished Service Order; Knight of Grace of the Order of St John; Kaisar-i-Hind Medal; Order of the Medjidie

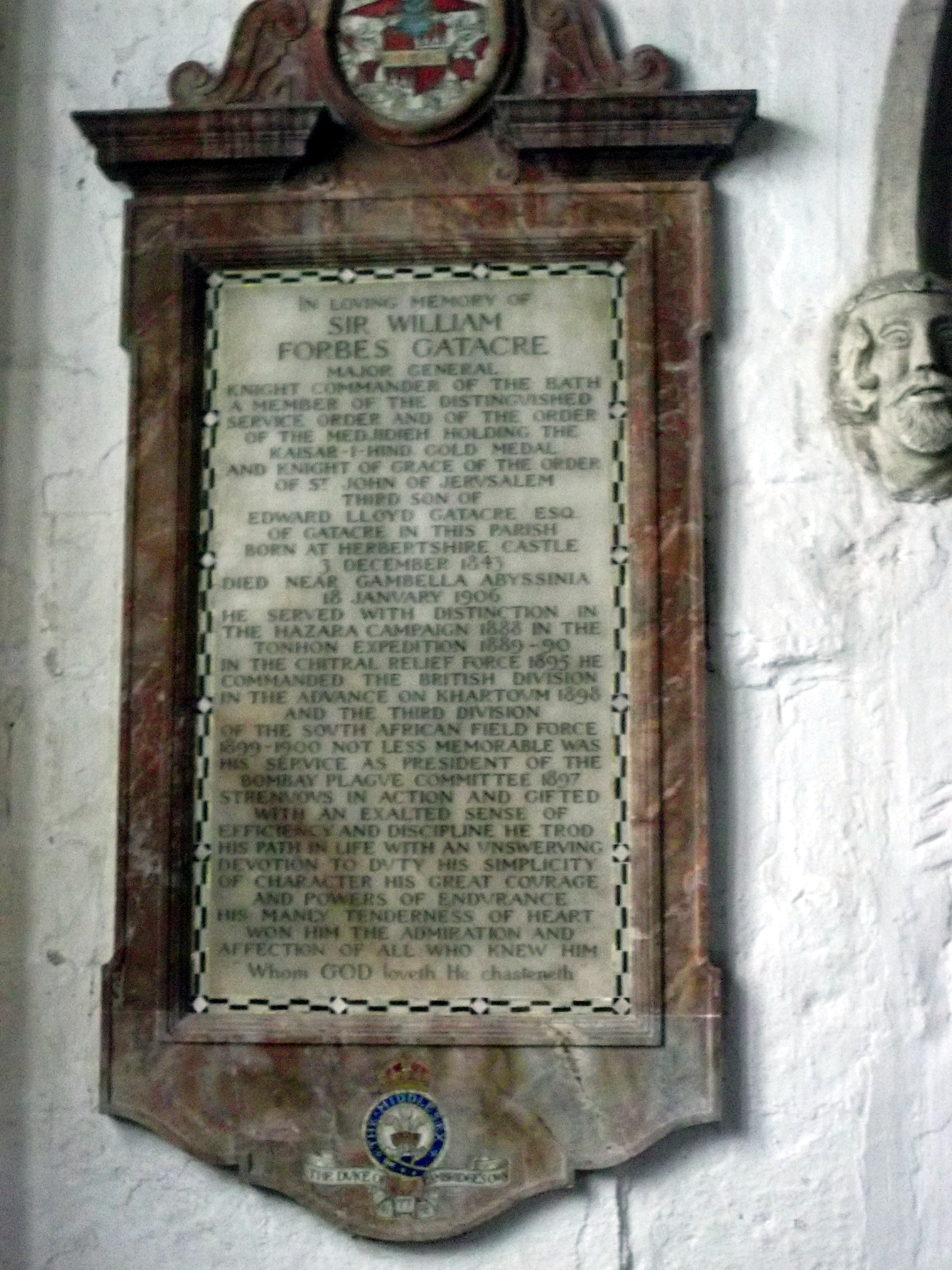
Memorial to William Forbes Gatacre, All Saints Church, Claverley, Shropshire, in the South Gatacre chapel

Lieutenant-General Sir William Forbes Gatacre KCB DSO KStJ (3 December 1843 – 18 January 1906) was a British Army officer who served in India and in the African continent. He commanded the British Army at the Battle of Omdurman and the 3rd Division during the first months of the Second Boer War, during which time he suffered a humiliating defeat at the Battle of Stormberg.

== Early life ==
William Forbes Gatacre was born at Herbertshire Castle, near Stirling, on 3 December 1843. He was the third son of Edward Lloyd Gatacre, of Gatacre, Claverley, Shropshire, and Jessie Forbes, whose father William Forbes owned Herbertshire Castle. He was educated at the Royal Military College, Sandhurst, and entered the army as an ensign of the 77th Foot in 1862, when he was posted to India. He purchased the rank of lieutenant on 23 December 1864.

== Military career ==
He purchased the rank of captain on 7 December 1870, shortly before the purchase of commissions was abolished, and passed into Staff College, Camberley, in 1873. Between 1875 and 1879 he returned to Sandhurst as an instructor of surveying. He then returned to India with his regiment in 1880 and was promoted to major on 23 March 1881.

On 29 April 1882 he was promoted to lieutenant-colonel and appointed to command a battalion on 28 June 1884 until he was made Deputy Quartermaster General in December 1885.

After service in the Hazara Expedition of 1888, and command of the Mandalay brigade during the Tonhon expedition in Burma in 1889–90, Gatacre gained the substantive rank of colonel and became Adjutant-General of the Bombay Army with local rank of major-general on 25 November 1890. While serving as a major-general in India in the early 1890s he was temporarily deranged by a jackal bite whilst hunting with the Bombay Jackal Club and he consequently barred his bungalow windows against jackals.

He was put in command of a second class district in India in January 1894. In the following year he commanded the Third Brigade of the Chitral Relief Force, and was mentioned in Lieutenant-General Sir Robert Low's dispatch of 1 May 1895. As Chairman of the Bombay Plague Committee he prepared the 3 volume 1896-7 Report on the Bubonic Plague of Bombay.

He returned home to command a brigade at Aldershot Command in August 1897.

Gatacre was selected to command the British Army forces during the reconquest of the Sudan, serving under General Kitchener, Commander-in-Chief of the Egyptian Army. In the Sudan, he commanded the British Brigade at the Battle of Atbara in April 1898, and a division of two British brigades at the Battle of Omdurman. Returning to England, he served as General Officer Commanding Eastern District from December 1898 to October 1899.

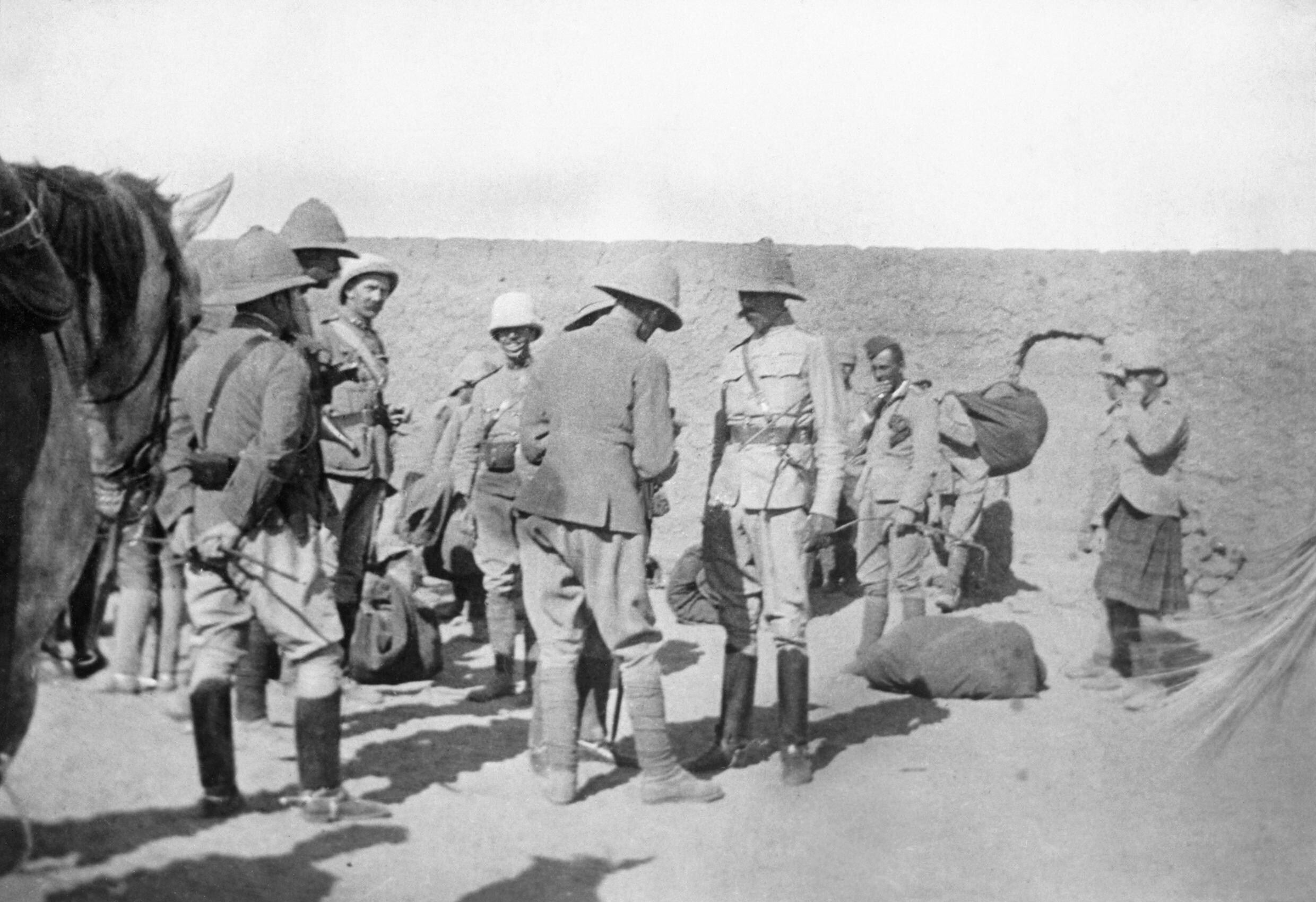
Major General Lord Kitchener, sirdar of the Egyptian Army (centre right), in discussion with the commander of the British brigade on the Nile, Major General Sir William Gatacre. Also with the group are Gatacre's orderly, Lieutenant Ronald Brooke of the 7th Hussars, and his aide-de-camp, Captain James Watson of the King's Royal Rifle Corps, at the start of the campaign.

At the outbreak of the Second Boer War, Gatacre was placed at the head of the 3rd division, with the rank of lieutenant-general. He was the commanding general of the Imperial forces at the Battle of Stormberg, during Black Week, in which 135 men were killed and 696 captured in an ambush. Although General Sir Redvers Buller, the British Commander-in-Chief in South Africa, publicly ascribed the defeat to bad luck only, and it was also suggested that his guides had been treacherous, Gatacre was blamed by many soldiers and commentators for the defeat. He was known for restless activity and for imposing needless marches and labour on his troops. He remained in command of the understrength 3rd Division, but after General Lord Roberts replaced Buller as Commander-in-Chief, he was sidelined to various occupation and "mopping-up" duties. He was eventually relieved of command after failing to rescue the Royal Irish Rifles who surrendered to Orange Free State Commandant-General Christiaan de Wet after a siege at Reddersburg on 3 April 1900.

His reputation, high after Omdurman, was diminished after Stormberg and subsequent action, and he returned to England and to his pre-war posting as General Officer Commanding Eastern District from June 1900 to December 1903. He retired in 1904.

In 1906 he embarked on a trading expedition through Anglo-Egyptian Sudan. He died of fever near Gambela, Ethiopia, an Anglo-Sudanese enclave leased by Emperor Menelik II, where Britain was in the process of establishing a port and a customs station.

Gatacre had a reputation of working his men hard, with his energetic style of leadership leading to subordinate officers often resenting him for not letting them do their jobs in their own way. The ordinary soldiers called him "General Backacher" but recognised that his activities were generally benevolent and on the whole thought well of him.

== Family ==
His elder brother was Major-General Sir John Gatacre who served in the Indian Army.

William Gatacre married twice, first in 1876 to Alice Susan Louisa, who was the third daughter of Anthony La Touche Kerwen, Dean of Limerick. He had three sons by his first marriage, the youngest of whom Major John Kirwan Gatacre, who had been educated at Rugby and Sandhurst, and posted to the Indian Army where he served with 11th King Edward's Own Lancers (Probyn's Horse), was killed in action in France on 13 October 1914 whilst attached to 4th Queen's Own Hussars.

He divorced his first wife in 1892 and he remarried in 1895 to The Hon. Beatrix Davey, who was the daughter of Horace Davey, Baron Davey. Beatrix, Lady Gatacre, wrote his biography in General Gatacre: The story of the life and services of Sir William Forbes Gatacre, K.C.B., D.S.O. 1843-1906 (London, 1910).

He is commemorated by a memorial plaque in All Saints Church, Claverley, Shropshire, which is the parish church of his eponymous family seat.

== Awards ==
- 7 December 1888: awarded the Distinguished Service Order.
- 24 January 1896: made Companion of the Order of the Bath (CB).
- 15 November 1898: CB upgraded to Knight Commander of the Order of the Bath.
- 10 May 1899: awarded the Order of the Medjidie Second Class.
- 23 May 1900: awarded the Gold Kaisar-i-Hind Medal for services as chairman of the plague committee of Bombay City 1896 & 1897.
- His memorial, shown above, confirms he was also a Knight of Grace of the Order of St John

Military offices
Preceded by Charles Burnett	GOC Eastern District; 1898–1899	Succeeded by Henry Abadie
Preceded by Henry Abadie	GOC Eastern District; 1900–1903	Succeeded by Herbert Plumer
