= Freeman Murray =

British Army general

General Freeman Murray CB
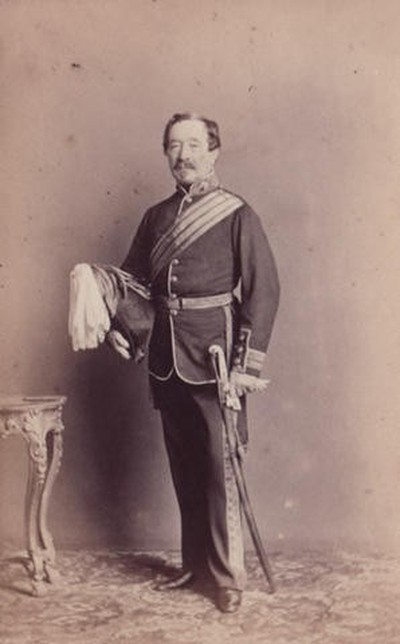
- Born: 16 November 1804; Valenciennes, France
- Died: 14 April 1885 (aged 80); Florence, Italy
- Military career
- Allegiance: United Kingdom
- Branch: British Army
- Rank: General
- Commands: Chatham District; Eastern District
- Awards: Companion of the Order of the Bath

General Freeman Murray CB (16 November 1804 – 14 April 1885) was a British Army officer who became General Officer Commanding Eastern District.

Murray was born in France, the son of General John Murray and his second wife, Canadian Maria Pascoe.

== Military career ==
Murray was commissioned as an ensign in the 64th Regiment of Foot on 5 March 1825. After commanding the 72nd Regiment of Foot, he served as Governor of Bermuda from 1854 to 1859 and again from 1860 to 1861.

He went on to be General Officer Commanding, Chatham District in January 1867 and General Officer Commanding Eastern District in April 1870.

Murray was also Colonel of the 57th (West Middlesex) Regiment of Foot from 1873 to 1875, the 93rd (Sutherland Highlanders) Regiment of Foot from 1875 to 1876 and the Second Battalion, King's Royal Rifle Corps from 1876 to 1895.

In 1832, he married Catherine Elizabeth Dundas, daughter of Hon. Charles Lawrence Dundas and granddaughter of Thomas Dundas, 1st Baron Dundas.

Military offices
Preceded by Richard Farren	GOC Eastern District; 1870–1872	Succeeded by Alexander Hamilton-Gordon
Preceded by Sir George Upton, 3rd Viscount Templetown	Colonel of the 2nd Battalion, 60th (King's Royal Rifle Corps) Regiment of Foot; 1876–1895	Succeeded by Sir Redvers Henry Buller
Preceded by Sir Henry William Stisted	Colonel of the 93rd (Sutherland Highlanders) Regiment of Foot; 1875–1876	Succeeded by William Munro
Preceded by Charles Richard Fox	Colonel of the 57th (West Middlesex) Regiment of Foot; 1873–1875	Succeeded by Sir Edward Alan Holdich
