= Battle of Atbara =

1898 battle of the Mahdist War

- Part of the Mahdist War
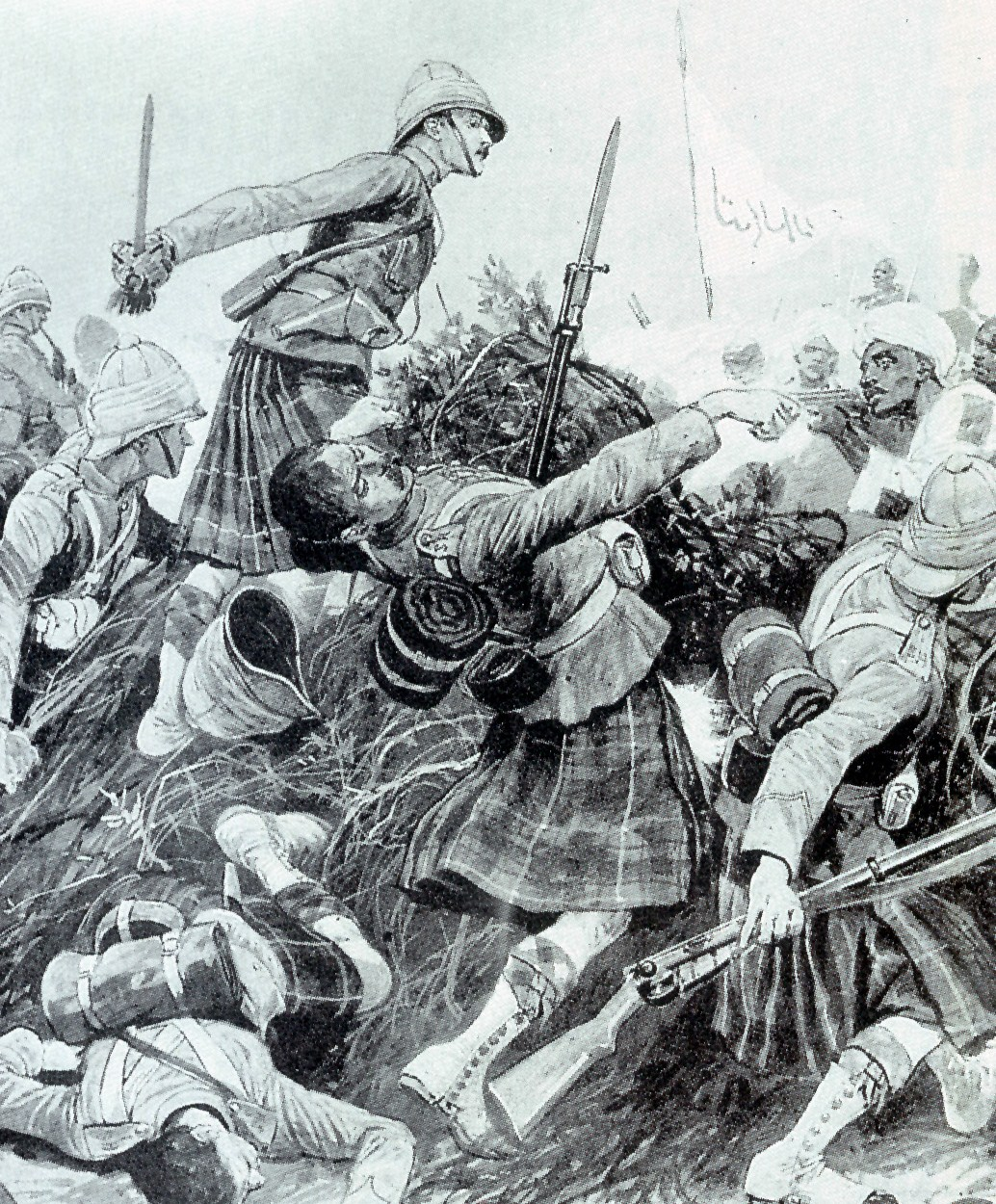
- The Seaforth Highlanders at the battle: Richard Caton Woodville, Jr.
Date	8 April 1898
Location	Confluence of the Nile and Atbara rivers, Sudan
Result	Anglo-Egyptian victory

Belligerents
United Kingdom; Egypt	Mahdist State

Commanders and leaders
Horatio Herbert Kitchener	Mahmud Ahmad (POW); Osman Digna

Strength
14,000 troops	12,000 infantry 3,000 cavalry

Casualties and losses
(United Kingdom) 26 killed, 99 wounded (Egypt) 57 killed, 386 wounded	2,000 killed+ 1,000 wounded 2,000 captured

The Battle of Atbara also known as the Battle of the Atbara River took place during the Mahdist War. Anglo-Egyptian forces defeated 15,000 Mahdists on the banks of the River Atbara. The battle proved to be the turning point in the reconquest of Sudan by the British and Egyptian coalition.

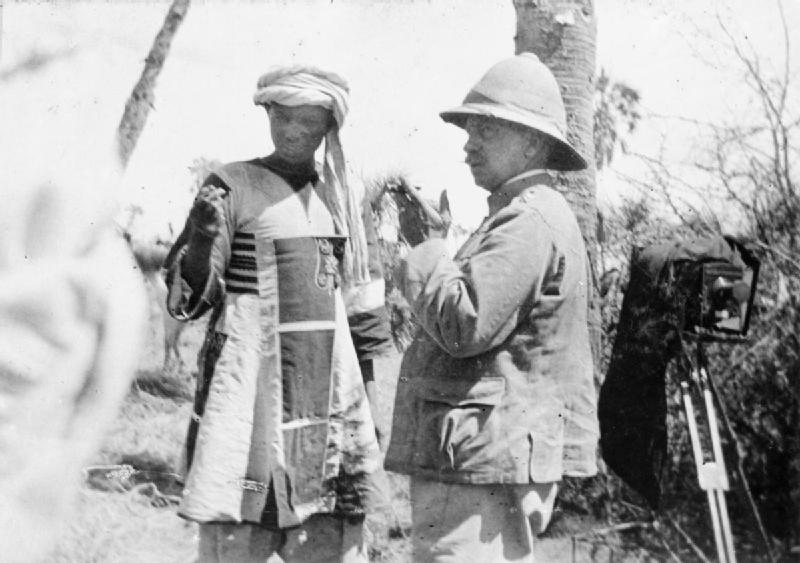
The defeated Emir Mahmud with the British Director of Military Intelligence Francis Wingate after the battle.

By 1898, the combined British and Egyptian army was heading south, advancing up the Nile into Sudan. The Sudanese Mahdist leader, the Khalifa Abdallahi ibn Muhammad ordered the Emir Mahmud Ahmad and his 10,000 strong army of western Sudan northward towards the junction of the Nile and the River Atbara to engage the British and Egyptian army led by Herbert Kitchener.

Encamping on the banks of the Atbara river by March 20, Mahmud, with Osman Digna's group of Mahdist warriors were within 20 miles (32 km) of the British camp outpost at Fort Atbara at the confluence of the Atbara with the Nile. On April 4, after seeing that the Mahdists were unwilling to attack, Kitchener quietly advanced with the British and Egyptian army towards the Mahdist fortified camp just outside the town of Nakheila.

The Anglo-Egyptian attack began at 06:20 on 8 April 1898. Three brigades, the British Brigade led by William Gatacre, and two Brigades of the Egyptian Division led by Archibald Hunter, led the attack. After a brief artillery bombardment of the Mahdist camp, the combined British and Egyptian brigades attacked. Soon, the British and Egyptian troops were in the Mahdist camp, often fighting hand-to-hand with the Mahdist warriors. After 45 minutes, the battle was over as Osman Digna led a few thousand warriors on a retreat to the south, while most of the remainder were killed or captured, including Mahmud who was captured by loyal Sudanese troops of the Egyptian Brigade.

The battle was celebrated by the Scottish poet William McGonagall.

== Other sources ==
- Raugh, Harold E. (2004-01-01). The Victorians at War, 1815–1914: An Encyclopedia of British Military History. ABC-CLIO. pp. 37–38. ISBN 9781576079256.
