= Western Command (United Kingdom) =

- Active: 1905–1972
- Country: United Kingdom
- Branch: British Army
- Type: Command
- Garrison/HQ: Chester

Western Command was a command of the British Army.

== History ==
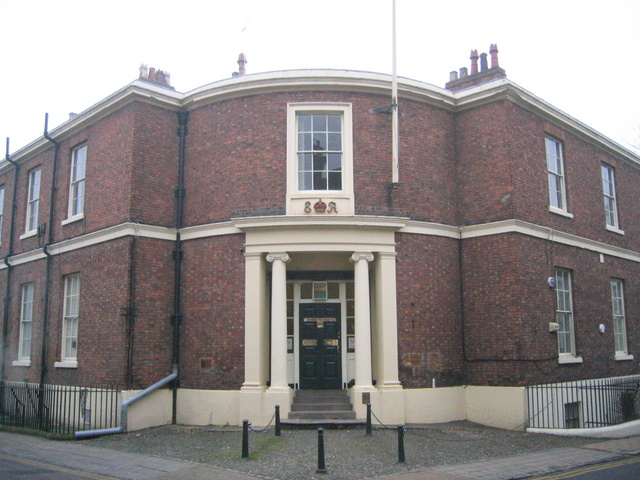
Watergate House, Chester, command headquarters from 1907 to 1938

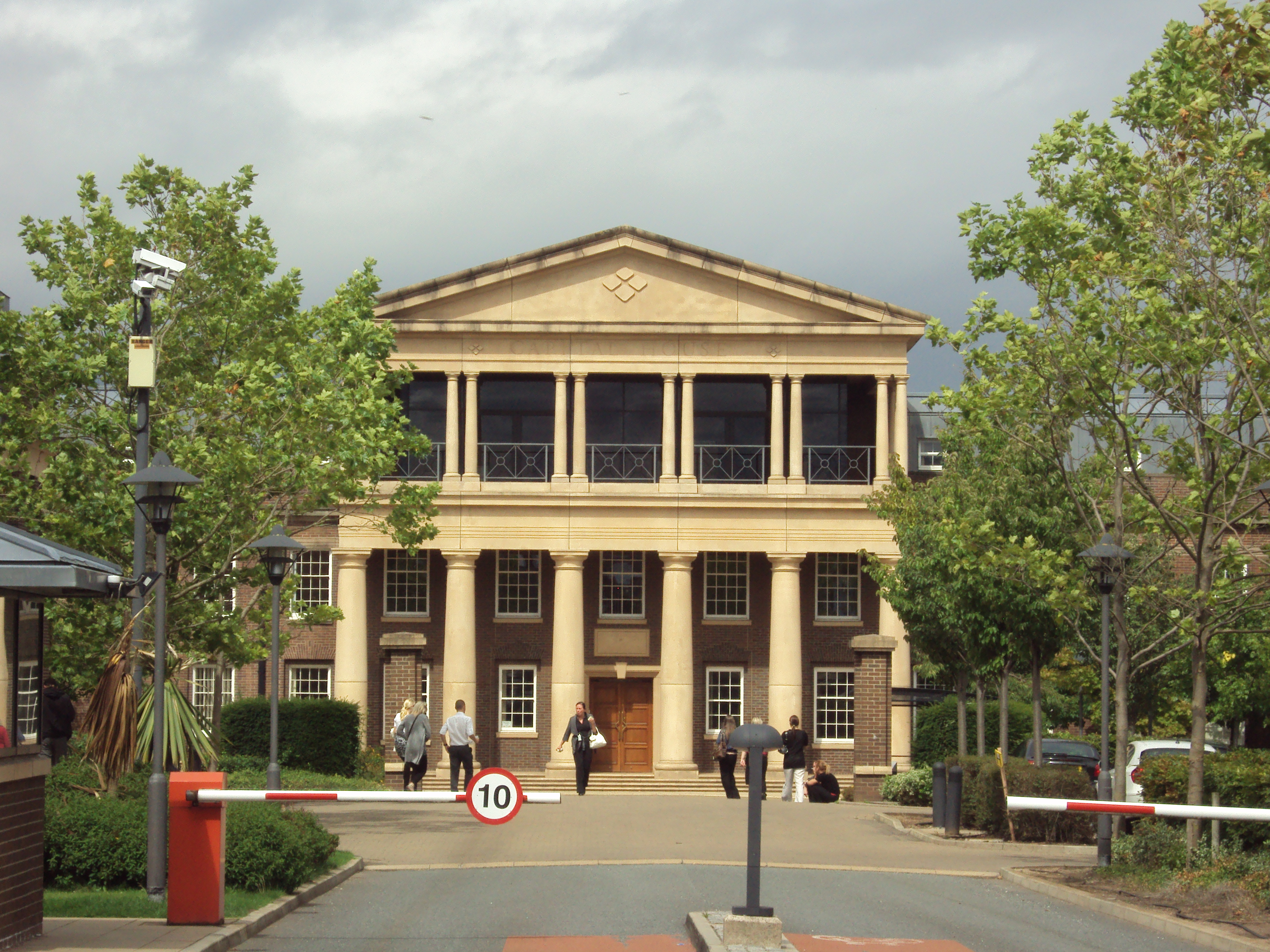
Churchill House, Chester, command headquarters from 1938 to 1972

Western Command was established in 1905 and was originally called the Welsh & Midland Command before changing its name in 1906. In 1907 Western Command relocated to Watergate House in Chester. In 1938, after a brief stay in temporary accommodation at Boughton, it moved to a new purpose-built neo-Georgian property known as Churchill House at Queen's Park in Chester.

=== First World War ===
Army Order No 324, issued on 21 August 1914, authorised the formation of a 'New Army' of six Divisions, composed of volunteers who had responded to Earl Kitchener's appeal (hence the First New Army was known as 'K1'). Each division was to be under the administration of one of the Home Commands, and Western Command formed what became the 13th (Western) Division. It was followed by 19th (Western) Division of K2 in September 1914.

=== Second World War ===
Increasing concern during the 1930s about the threat of air attack led to large numbers of units of the part-time Territorial Army (TA) being converted to anti-aircraft (AA) gun and searchlight roles in the Royal Artillery (RA) and Royal Engineers (RE), and higher formations became necessary to control them. One such formation was the 4th Anti-Aircraft Division, raised on 1 September 1938 within the Western Command area, with its headquarters at Chester. The first General Officer Commanding (GOC) was Maj-Gen Hugh Martin. The division came under the control of Anti-Aircraft Command, however.

In 1939, under Lieutenant General Robert Haining, Western Command consisted of Welsh, West Lancashire, and East Lancashire Areas, each commanding two divisions plus other troops. It covered Wales and the Counties of Cumberland, Westmorland, Lancashire, Staffordshire, Shropshire, Herefordshire, Cheshire, and Beachley, Gloucestershire as well as the Isle of Man and the coast defence garrisons of Berehaven, Queenstown and (for the purpose of technical training only) Lough Swilly.

Regular Troops reporting to the Command included:

- 2nd Battalion, The Buffs (Royal East Kent Regiment)
- 2nd Anti-Aircraft Brigade

During 1943–44, the 80th Infantry (Reserve) Division was assigned to the Command as its training formation. On 1 September 1944, the division was replaced by the 38th Infantry (Reserve) Division, which took over the training role.

=== Post War ===
The Command was merged into HQ UK Land Forces (HQ UKLF) in 1972 and the property handed over to the Royal Army Pay Corps.

== General Officers Commanding-in-Chief ==
GOCs and GOCinCs have included:
General Officer Commanding North Western District

- 1889–1890: Major-General William Goodenough
- 1890–1895: Lieutenant-General Julian Hall
- 1895–1896: Major-General Sir Baker Creed Russell
- 1896–1902: Major-General Leopold Swaine
- 1902–1903: Major-General Henry Hallam Parr
- 1904–1905: Major-General Sir Francis Howard

General Officer Commanding in Chief Western Command

- 1905 – 1907 Major General Sir Francis Howard
- 1907 – 1910 Lieutenant General Sir Charles Burnett
- 1910 – 1916 Lieutenant General Sir Henry Mackinnon
- 1916 – 1918 Lieutenant General Sir William Campbell
- 1918 – 1919 Lieutenant General Sir Thomas Snow
- 1919 – 1923 Lieutenant General Sir Beauvoir De Lisle
- 1923 – 1924 Lieutenant General Sir John Du Cane
- 1924 – 1928 Lieutenant General Sir Richard Butler
- 1928 – 1931 Lieutenant General Sir Cecil Romer
- 1931 – 1933 Lieutenant General Sir Cyril Deverell
- 1933 – 1936 Lieutenant General Sir Walter Kirke
- 1936 – 1939 Lieutenant General Sir Henry Jackson
- 1939 – 1940 Lieutenant General Sir Robert Haining
- 1940 General Sir Henry Jackson
- 1940 – 1941 General Sir Robert Gordon-Finlayson
- 1941 – 1942 Lieutenant General Sir James Marshall-Cornwall
- 1942 – 1944 Lieutenant General Sir Edmond Schreiber
- 1944 – 1946 Lieutenant General Sir Daril Watson
- 1946 – 1948 Lieutenant General Sir Brian Horrocks
- 1948 – 1951 Lieutenant General Sir Frank Simpson
- 1951 – 1953 Lieutenant General Sir Cameron Nicholson
- 1953 – 1953 Lieutenant General Sir Charles Loewen
- 1953 – 1957 General Sir Lashmer Whistler
- 1957 – 1960 Lieutenant General Sir Otway Herbert
- 1960 – 1961 Lieutenant General Sir William Stirling
- 1961 – 1964 Lieutenant General Sir Edward Howard-Vyse
- 1964 – 1966 Lieutenant General Sir Richard Craddock
- 1966 – 1969 Lieutenant General Sir Antony Read
- 1969 – 1972 Lieutenant General Sir Napier Crookenden
