= Richard Farren =

British Army general

General Sir Richard Farren GCB
- Born: 9 November 1817
- Died: 130 December 1909 (aged 92)
- Military career
- Allegiance: United Kingdom
- Branch: British Army
- Rank: General
- Commands: Eastern District; Troops in the West Indies
- Conflicts: Crimean War
- Awards: Knight Grand Cross of the Order of the Bath

General Sir Richard Thomas Farren GCB (9 November 1817 – 30 December 1909) was a British Army officer who became General Officer Commanding Eastern District.

== Military career ==
Farren was commissioned as an ensign in 1834. He commanded the 47th (Lancashire) Regiment of Foot during the Crimean War for which he was awarded the Turkish Order of the Medjidie, 4th Class.

He went on to be General Officer Commanding Eastern District in October 1869 and General Officer Commanding the Troops in the West Indies in June 1875.

He was made Colonel of the 35th (Royal Sussex) Regiment of Foot from 1879 until it was amalgamated in 1881 with the 107th Foot to form the Royal Sussex Regiment, after which he was Colonel of the 1st Battalion of the new regiment until 1885. He was afterwards Colonel of The Loyal North Lancashire Regiment from 1885 to his death. He was promoted full general on 29 April 1880.

He died in 1909 at the age of 92. His death was registered in Woodbridge, Suffolk. He is buried in the churchyard of St Mary's, Great Bealings, Suffolk.

Military offices
| Preceded by Thomas Tidy | GOC Eastern District; 1869–1870 | Succeeded by Freeman Murray |
| Preceded by Sir William Sherbrooke Ramsay Norcott | Colonel of the Loyal North Lancashire Regiment; 1885–1909 | Succeeded by Hugh Thomas Jones-Vaughan |
| Preceded by Henry Renny | Colonel of the Royal Sussex Regiment; 1881–1885 | Succeeded by Sir Richard Thomas Farren |
| Preceded by Henry Renny | Colonel of the 35th (Royal Sussex) Regiment of Foot; 1879–1881 | Succeeded by Amalgamated to form the Royal Sussex Regiment |
