= Henry Richard Abadie =

British Army officer (1841–1915)

Major-General Henry Richard Abadie CB
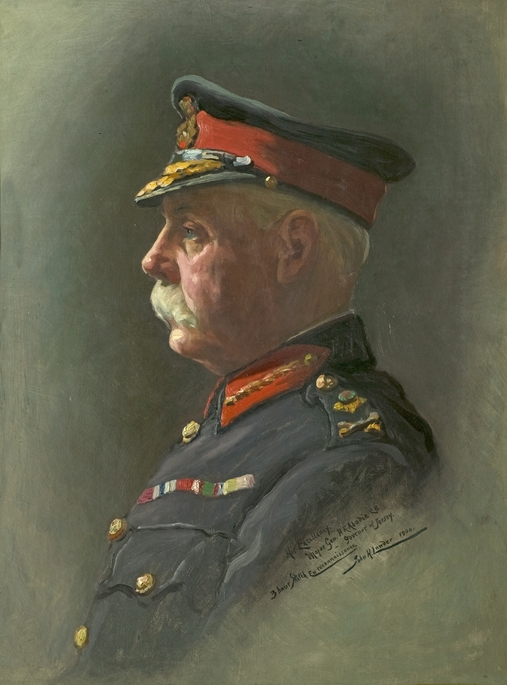
- Portrait by John St Helier Lander, 1904
- Born: 25 March 1841
- Died: 9 May 1915 (aged 74)
- Military career
- Allegiance: United Kingdom
- Branch: British Army
- Rank: Major-General
- Commands: Eastern District
- Conflicts: 1868 Expedition to Abyssinia; Second Anglo-Afghan War
- Awards: Companion of the Order of the Bath

Major-General Henry Richard Abadie CB (25 March 1841 – 9 May 1915) was a British Army officer. He was GOC (General officer commanding) Eastern District at the end of the 19th century and the Lieutenant Governor of Jersey for four years thereafter.

== Background ==
Abadie was the son of Louis Pascal Abadie, who lived in the castle of Pellepoix, at Beaumont-de-Lomagne, in France. He was married first to Kate Sandeman and following her death in 1883 to Caroline, daughter of Colonel Fanshawe Gostling in 1890. His four sons with Kate Sandeman all died while on military service: two in Africa to disease and two during the First World War.

== Military career ==
Abadie joined the army in 1858 and served in the 1868 Expedition to Abyssinia, where he was involved in the Battle of Magdala. He was made a captain 1872 and fought in the Second Anglo-Afghan War, including the Battle of Kandahar in 1880. He was with the 9th Lancers and commanded the Cavalry Depot at Canterbury from 1894 to 1897.

From 1899 to 1900 he commanded Eastern District, during which he was promoted to major-general and created a Companion of the Order of the Bath.

=== Jersey ===
Thereafter Abadie was appointed the Lieutenant Governor of Jersey, a post he held until 1904. There is a painting of him at his regimental museum in Derby by John St Helier Lander, an artist whom he met while living in Jersey.

Military offices
Preceded by Sir William Gatacre	GOC Eastern District; 1899–1900	Succeeded by Sir William Gatacre
Government offices
Preceded by Sir Edward Hopton	Lieutenant Governor of Jersey; 1900–1904	Succeeded by Hugh Gough
