= Henry Mackinnon =

World War I British Army general (1852–1929)

General Sir Henry Mackinnon GCB KCVO
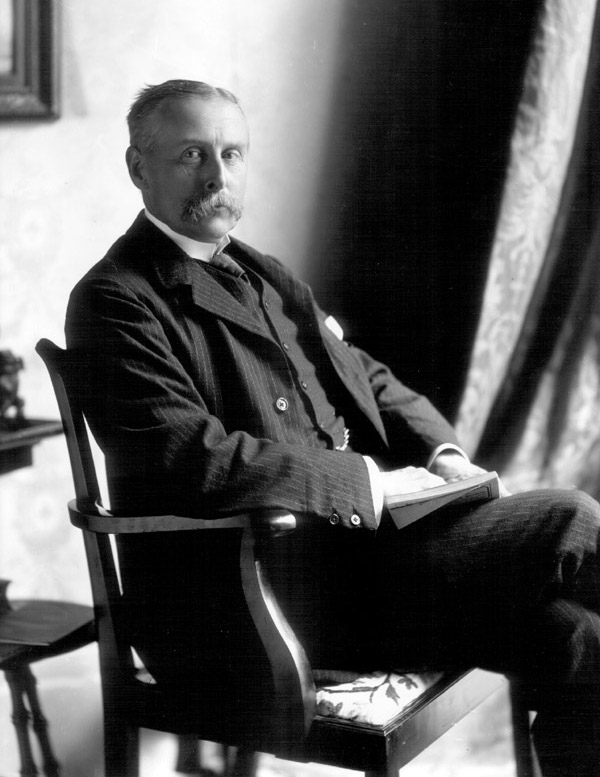
- Mackinnon in 1906
- Born: 15 December 1852; London, England
- Died: 17 March 1929 (aged 76); London, England
- Military career
- Allegiance: United Kingdom
- Branch: British Army
- Rank: General
- Commands: Western Command
- Conflicts: Second Boer War; World War I
- Awards: Knight Grand Cross of the Order of the Bath; Knight Commander of the Royal Victorian Order

General Sir William Henry Mackinnon, GCB, KCVO (15 December 1852 – 17 March 1929) was a British Army General during World War I.

== Military career ==
Henry Mackinnon was born in London on 15 December 1852. Educated at Rose Hill School and then Harrow School, he was commissioned into the Grenadier Guards in 1870. He was appointed military secretary to Governor of Malta in 1884 and then Private Secretary to the Governor of Madras in India in 1885–1887. He then became assistant adjutant general at Home District in 1893.

After the outbreak of the Second Boer War in October 1899, a corps of imperial volunteers from London was formed in late December 1899. The corps included infantry, mounted infantry and artillery (the latter including members of the Honourable Artillery Company and the City of London Artillery), and was authorized with the name City of London Imperial Volunteers. It proceeded to South Africa in January 1900, returned in October the same year, and was disbanded in December 1900. Colonel Mackinnon was appointed colonel commandant of the corps 22 December 1899, and served as such until it was disbanded.

He was invested as a Commander of the Royal Victorian Order (CVO) on 11 August 1902.

He was later appointed Director of Auxiliary Forces in 1905 and, after being promoted to lieutenant general in October 1907, director general of the Territorial Forces in January 1908. He was appointed general officer commanding-in-chief for Western Command on 31 October 1910, taking over from General Sir Charles Burnett. He had been promoted to general in October 1913 and retired from the army on in 1916.

He lived at Carlisle Place in London and died at his home in London on 17 March 1929.

== Family ==
In 1881 he married Madeleine Frances Hatton and they went on to have one daughter.

Military offices
Preceded by Sir Charles Burnett	GOC-in-C Western Command; 1910–1916	Succeeded by Sir William Campbell
Preceded by Edward Clive	Colonel of the King's (Liverpool) Regiment; 1916–1923	Succeeded by Sir Charles Harington
