= John Glyn =

British Army general (1837–1912)

Lieutenant-General Sir John Glyn KCB
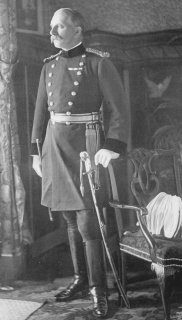
- Born: 11 January 1837; Witchampton, Dorset
- Died: 28 March 1912 (aged 75)
- Relatives: Ellen Dewar (wife)
- Military career
- Allegiance: United Kingdom
- Branch: British Army
- Service years: 1854–
- Rank: Lieutenant-General
- Units: 2nd Battalion, The Rifle Brigade
- Commands: Eastern District
- Conflicts: Crimean War; Anglo-Ashanti War; Anglo-Zulu War
- Awards: KCB

Lieutenant-General Sir John Plumptre Carr Glyn KCB (11 January 1837 – 28 March 1912) was a British general who saw active service in the Crimean War and the Anglo-Ashanti War.

== Early life ==
John Plumptre Carr Glyn was born Witchampton, east Dorset.

== Military career ==
He joined the Rifle Brigade in August 1854 just before the opening of hostilities in the Crimea. He saw active service during the second year of the campaign and was present at Sebastopol from 17 June until the fall of the fortress on 11 September 1855.

He was promoted from ensign to lieutenant without purchase on 29 December 1854.

He next saw active service, in 1874, as a major in the 2nd Battalion of the Rifle Brigade, under Colonel Sir Garnet Wolseley during the Third Anglo-Ashanti War. He was personally involved in the Battle of Amoaful on 31 January 1874 and five days later when the fighting ended with the Battle of Ordashu. He was also present at the capture of the capital, Kumasi, which had been abandoned by the Ashanti.

The Ashanti War gave him his brevet of lieutenant-colonel on 1 April 1874.

He was promoted to the rank of colonel in 1879.

On 16 December 1884, while on half pay, he was gazetted to be Lieutenant-Colonel, to command the 22nd Regimental District (the Cheshire Regiment).

In 1892 he succeeded Sir Evelyn Wood as the General Officer Commanding the Eastern District at home and held the post until 1896.

He was promoted to the rank of major-general in 1889 and to lieutenant-general in January 1898.

The 1901 Census of England indicates that he had retired and was living in the parish of Holt, Dorset.

He was appointed colonel commandant of the Rifle Brigade (The Prince Consort's Own) on 18 January 1908.

== The Ashanti Ring ==
The Ashanti Ring, also known as the Wolseley ring, was a group of 19th century British army officers loyal to Garnet Wolseley and considered by him to be clever, brave, experienced and hard-working. The 'ring' itself was rooted in Wolseley's appointments for the Ashanti Campaign of 1873–4, in which Wolseley led British troops to take control of the Gold Coast.

After the Crimean War Wolseley started to keep a note of the best officers he met, and began gathering a network of able military men loyal to him. There were other circles around other military leaders; later these would dwindle as more formal selection and promotion procedures became established.

Men from this group accompanied Wolseley on his various projects for about a decade. They are sometimes called the Ashanti Ring, or, in a punning reference to Wolseley's first name, the Garnet Ring.

Later they were the Africans against the Indians of the rival Roberts Ring of Lord Roberts and Herbert Kitchener during the Boer War.

== Family life ==
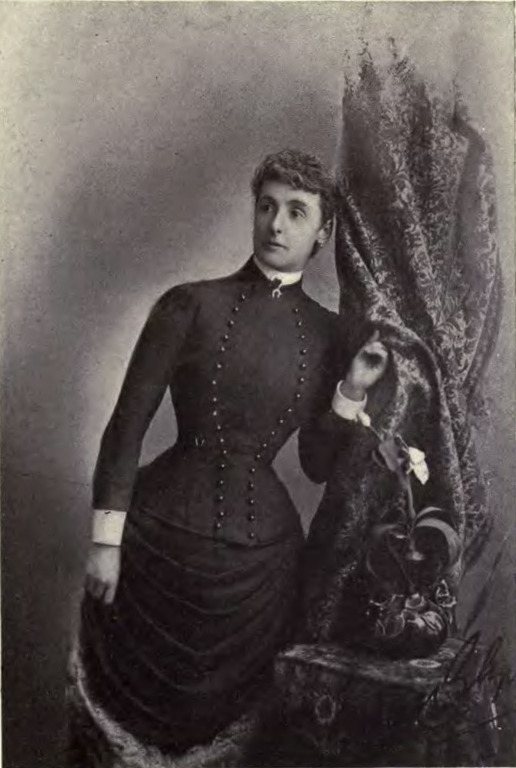
Ellen Dewar Glyn

Glyn's great-grandfather Sir Richard Glyn, 1st Baronet, of Ewell and grandfather Sir Richard Glyn, 1st Baronet, of Gaunt's House were wealthy bankers and politicians. Glyn's father was Rev. Carr John Glyn (1799–1896), who was a godfather and namesake to Handley Carr Glyn Moule, a theologian and bishop of Durham.

On 11 September 1866 John Glyn married Ellen (d. 20 April 1928), eldest daughter of James Robert Dalton Dewar of Kent. In the 1901 Census, Ellen is listed as a Belgium British subject.

- Their daughter Ada Carr-Glyn was baptised at The Church of the Holy Rood Buckland Newton in Dorset on 9 December 1870. She married Lt-Col Dudley Granville Richard Ryder, son of Dudley Henry Ryder and Georgiana Emily Calcraft, on 24 October 1889. She died in 1950.
- Daughter, Nellie Georgiana Carr married Sir George Henry Sutherland (d. 11 May 1937) on 11 June 1890. She died on 18 April 1891.
- Son John Carr Glyn was unmarried.

Glyn died on 28 March 1912.

== Honours ==
Lt-Genl Sir John Plumptre Carr-Glyn was invested as a Knight Commander, Order of the Bath (KCB).

Military offices
Preceded by Henry Buchanan	GOC Eastern District; 1892–1896	Succeeded by Charles Burnett
