= Charles Burnett (British Army officer) =

British Army general (1843–1915)

General Sir Charles Burnett KCB KCVO
- Born: 30 October 1843; St Kilda, Victoria, Australia
- Died: 10 November 1915 (aged 72); Middlesex, England
- Military career
- Allegiance: United Kingdom
- Branch: British Army
- Rank: General
- Commands: Eastern District; Western Command
- Awards: Knight Commander of the Order of the Bath; Knight Commander of the Royal Victorian Order

General Sir Charles John Burnett KCB KCVO (30 October 1843 – 10 November 1915) was a British Army officer at the end of the 19th century and during the early years of the 20th century.

== Military career ==
Burnett was born in St Kilda, Victoria, the son of John Alexander Burnett. He was commissioned into the 15th Foot in 1861. He participated in the Third Anglo-Ashanti War of 1873 to 1874, then attended and graduated from the Royal Military College, Sandhurst. He next saw active service in the Second Anglo-Afghan War of 1878 to 1880.

Burnett became assistant adjutant-general in Bombay in 1880 and commanding officer of the Royal Irish Rifles in 1887. He rose to be assistant adjutant-general at Aldershot in 1893. Promoted to major general in 1895, he became General Officer Commanding the Eastern District in 1896 before being posted to British India in 1898, where he was Commander of the Poona District by 1900. He was awarded the Kaisar-i-Hind Medal in the 1900 Birthday Honours. He was promoted to lieutenant general on 3 April 1905.

During the Russo-Japanese War of 1904 to 1905, he was the senior British military observer embedded within the Imperial Japanese Army in Manchuria from February to September 1905.

He served as general officer commanding-in-chief (GOC-in-C) of Western Command, taking over from Major General Sir Francis Howard on 29 April 1907, holding this post until 1910. He was promoted to general on 20 August 1909.

He retired in 1910.

== Notes ==
Military offices
Preceded by John Glyn	GOC Eastern District; 1896–1898	Succeeded by Sir William Gatacre
Preceded by Sir Francis Howard	GOC-in-C Western Command; 1907–1910	Succeeded by Sir Henry Mackinnon
