= Francis Howard (British Army officer, born 1848) =

British Army general (1848–1930)

Major-General Sir Francis Howard KCB KCMG DL
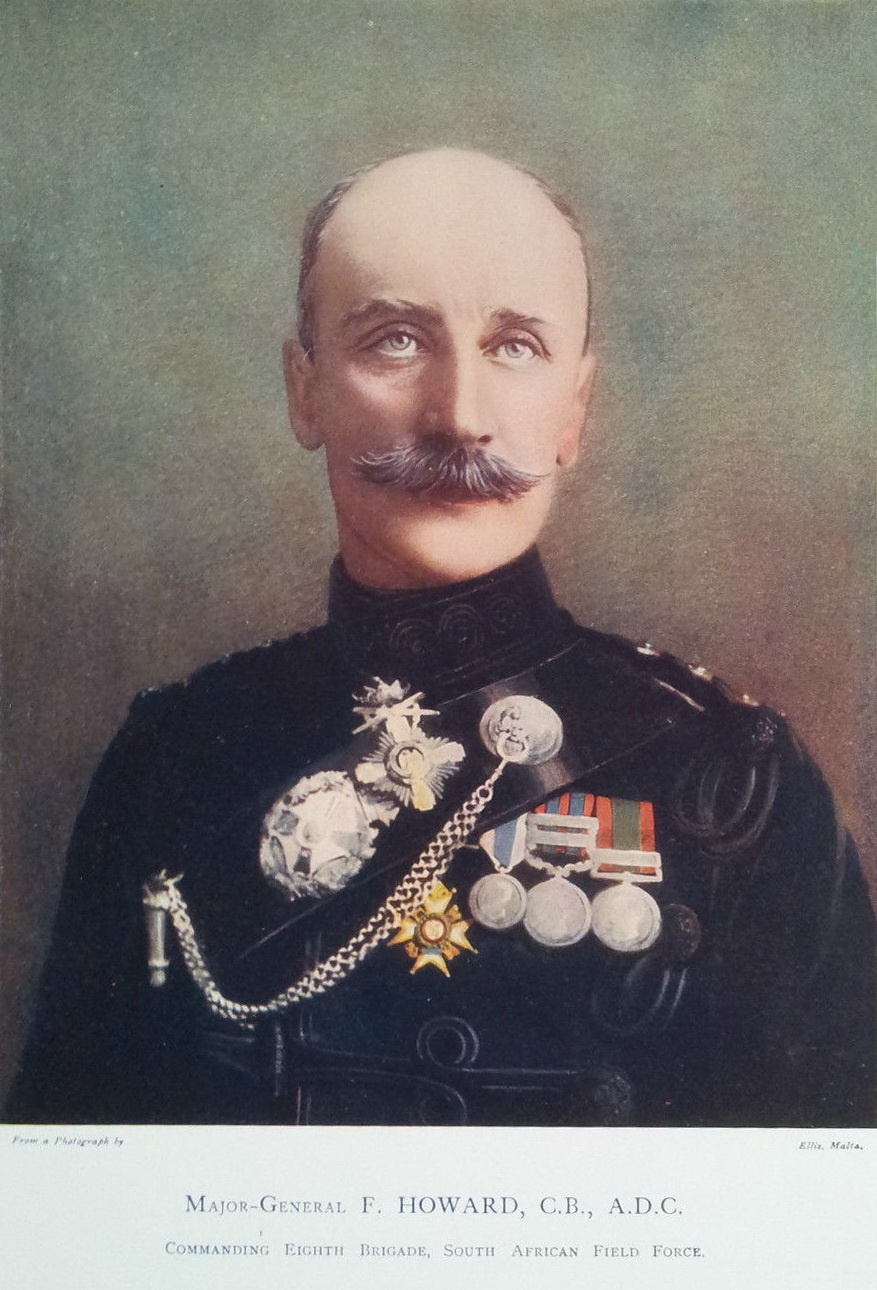
- Born: 26 March 1848; Berlin, Kingdom of Prussia
- Died: 21 March 1930 (aged 81); Castle Godwyn, Painswick, Gloucestershire
- Military career
- Allegiance: United Kingdom
- Branch: British Army
- Rank: Major-General
- Commands: Western Command
- Conflicts: Second Afghan War; Sudanese campaign Second Boer War
- Awards: Knight Commander of the Order of the Bath; Knight Commander of the Order of St Michael and St George

Major-General Sir Francis Howard KCB KCMG DL (26 March 1848 – 21 March 1930) was a British Army officer in the late nineteenth and early twentieth centuries. He was a member of the aristocratic Howard family, influential Catholic nobility.

== Early life ==
Howard was born in Berlin, a younger son of the diplomat Sir Henry Francis Howard (1809–1898) by his second wife, Baroness Marie Ernestine von der Schulenburg. His elder brother was another diplomat, Sir Henry Howard (1843–1921).

Howard was a male-line descendant of the Dukes of Norfolk through Lord William Howard, younger son of Thomas Howard, 4th Duke of Norfolk, by his second wife.

== Military career ==
Howard was commissioned into the Rifle Brigade in 1866. He took part in the Jowaki Expedition in India in 1877 and then, during the Afghan War, in the Bazaar Valley and Lughman Expeditions of 1878 and 1879, and in operations in Upper Burma between 1887 and 1889.

On 5 December 1894 he was promoted to lieutenant colonel and appointed commanding officer (CO) of the 2nd Battalion, Rifle Brigade, which he commanded in the 1898 Sudanese campaign, including the Battle of Omdurman, and then in Crete.

During the Second Boer War, he was commander of 8th Brigade and took part in the Defence of Ladysmith in 1900. He later served on the Staff and was placed on half-pay 26 December 1900.

In early 1903 he took part in the special mission (headed by Lord Downe) deputized by the King to travel to Iran to present the Shah with the insignia of the Order of the Garter.

On 30 September 1903 he was promoted to major general and made inspector general of recruiting. He was then commander of North Western District in 1904. He was appointed general officer commanding-in-chief at Western Command in 1905 and retired from the army on 28 July 1909.

He was recalled as an inspector of infantry on 28 September 1914 during the early stages of World War I.

On 9 December 1919, Howard was appointed a deputy lieutenant of Gloucestershire.

Howard held a number of honorary military appointments, including aide-de-camp to the Queen in 1895; colonel of the Gloucestershire Regiment on 6 January 1912 and colonel commandant of the 2nd Battalion, Rifle Brigade, an appointment he held until June 1921).

In 1924 Howard published his memoirs, entitled Reminiscences, 1848–1890.

== Marriage and issue ==
In 1895, Howard married Gertrude Jane Boyd, daughter of Hugh Conyngham Boyd. They had one son and one daughter.

- Francis "Frank" Howard (2 February 1896 – 16 June 1903), died young at Thornbury Castle
- Marjorie Howard (9 August 1903 – 3 August 1982), married in 1931 Hon. George John Theodore Hyde Villiers (1891–1942), grandson of George Villiers, 4th Earl of Clarendon and brother of 5th Earl

== Decorations ==
- Commander of the Order of the Star of Romania 1892
- Companion of the Order of the Bath (CB) 22 June 1897, 1897 Diamond Jubilee Honours
- Companion of the Order of St Michael and St George (CMG) 1899, following service in Crete
- Knight Commander of the Order of the Bath (KCB) 29 November 1900, in recognition of services in connection with the Campaign in South Africa 1899–1900
- Commander of the Order of Saint Michael (Bavaria) 1902
- Knight Commander of the Order of St Michael and St George (KCMG) 1917

Military offices
Preceded by Henry Hallam Parr	GOC North Western District (GOC-in-C Welsh and Midland Command 1905; GOC-in-C Western Command 1906); 1904–1907	Succeeded by Sir Charles Burnett
