= Edward Hopton =

British Army officer; (1837–1912)

Lieutenant-General Sir Edward Hopton KCB DL JP
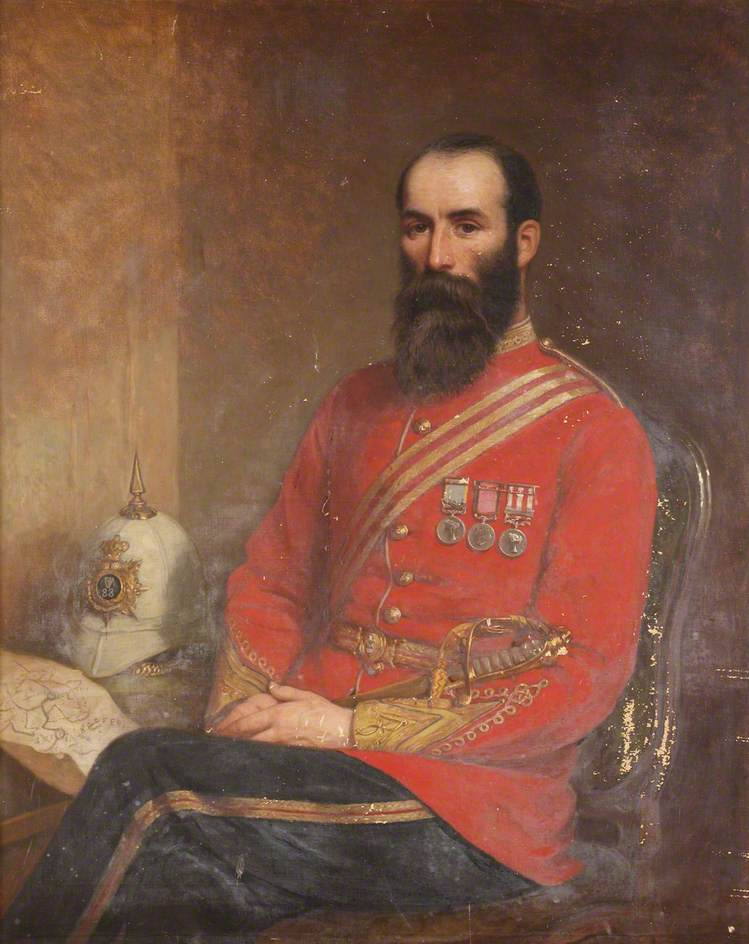
- Portrait by an unknown artist, 1880
- Born: 7 February 1837
- Died: 19 January 1912 (aged 74); Stretton Grandison, Herefordshire
- Military career
- Allegiance: United Kingdom
- Branch: British Army
- Service years: 1854 – 1900
- Rank: Lieutenant-General
- Conflicts: Crimean War; Siege of Sevastopol; Indian Mutiny; Siege of Lucknow; 9th Xhosa War

Lieutenant-General Sir Edward Hopton KCB DL JP (7 February 1837 – 19 January 1912) was a British Army officer who became Lieutenant Governor of Jersey.

== Early life ==
Hopton was born the eldest son of the Reverend W.P. Hopton and his wife, Diana. He was educated at Eton College and joined the Army in 1854.

== Military career ==
Hopton was commissioned into the 79th Foot. He fought at the Siege of Sevastapol during the Crimean War and at the Siege of Lucknow during the Indian Mutiny and then served with the Connaught Rangers during the 9th Xhosa War of 1877 to 1878. He was promoted lieutenant-colonel on 18 December 1880, colonel on 11 November 1882, major-general on 1 April 1892, and lieutenant-general on 19 December 1898. After the death of the previous holder, he was on 15 January 1900 appointed regimental colonel of the Connaught Rangers.

Hopton was appointed Lieutenant Governor of Jersey in 1895, and thus also in command of the troops on the island. During the Second Boer War he had some difficulty maintaining order on Jersey in the face of Pro-Boer attitudes of some of the French Islanders.

In retirement, he became Deputy Lieutenant of Herefordshire and Honorary Colonel of the 4th (Hereford Militia) Battalion, King's Shropshire Light Infantry.

== Family ==
In 1874, he married Clare Ellen Trafford; they had two sons and two daughters.

Government offices
Preceded by Sir Edwin Markham	Lieutenant Governor of Jersey; 1895–1900	Succeeded by Henry Abadie
