= Philip James Yorke =

Philip James Yorke (13 October 1799 – 14 December 1874) was a British Army officer, scientist and Fellow of the Royal Society. Yorke was a founder of the Chemical Society in the United Kingdom.

== Life ==
Yorke was born on 13 October 1799, the eldest son of Philip Yorke and Anna Maria, daughter of Charles Cocks, 1st Baron Somers. One of his paternal great-grandfathers was Earl of Hardwicke.

At age nine, Yorke went to study under Dr. Pearson in Surrey. At age 12, he entered Harrow School in London. In 1810, Yorke left Harrow and purchased a commission in the Scots Fusilier Guards. He remained with the Guards until 1852 eventually becoming a Lieutenant-Colonel. He was then appointed Colonel of the disembodied Herefordshire Militia, a post he held for three years while the regiment was embodied for home defence in the Crimean War.

On 27 April 1843 Yorke married Emily Clifford, the youngest daughter of William Morgan Clifford of Perrystone, Herefordshire. Yorke died on 14 December 1874.

== Works ==
The Royal Society's catalogue contains a list of thirteen papers by Yorke, showing that he was an accomplished chemist, meteorologist and mineralogist. His first scientific paper was an investigation of the action of lead on water (Philosophical Magazine, 1834 [3] v. 81). He also took an active part in the Royal Institution of Great Britain, frequently serving as a manager.

In 1841, Yorke was one of the original members of the Chemical Society, now the Royal Society of Chemistry. Yorke was elected a Fellow of the Royal Society in 1849. He became vice-president of the Chemical Society in 1852 and served as president from 30 March 1853 to 30 March 1855.

== Notes ==
Attribution

This article incorporates text from a publication now in the public domain: Lee, Sidney, ed. (1900). "Yorke, Philip James". Dictionary of National Biography. Vol. 63. London: Smith, Elder & Co.
