= Queen's Gardens, Westminster =

Garden square in City of Westminster, London

Coordinates: 51°30′49.22″N 0°10′55.43″W

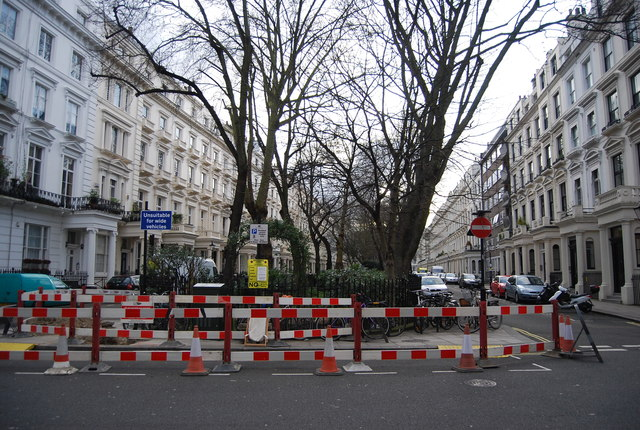
Queen's Gardens

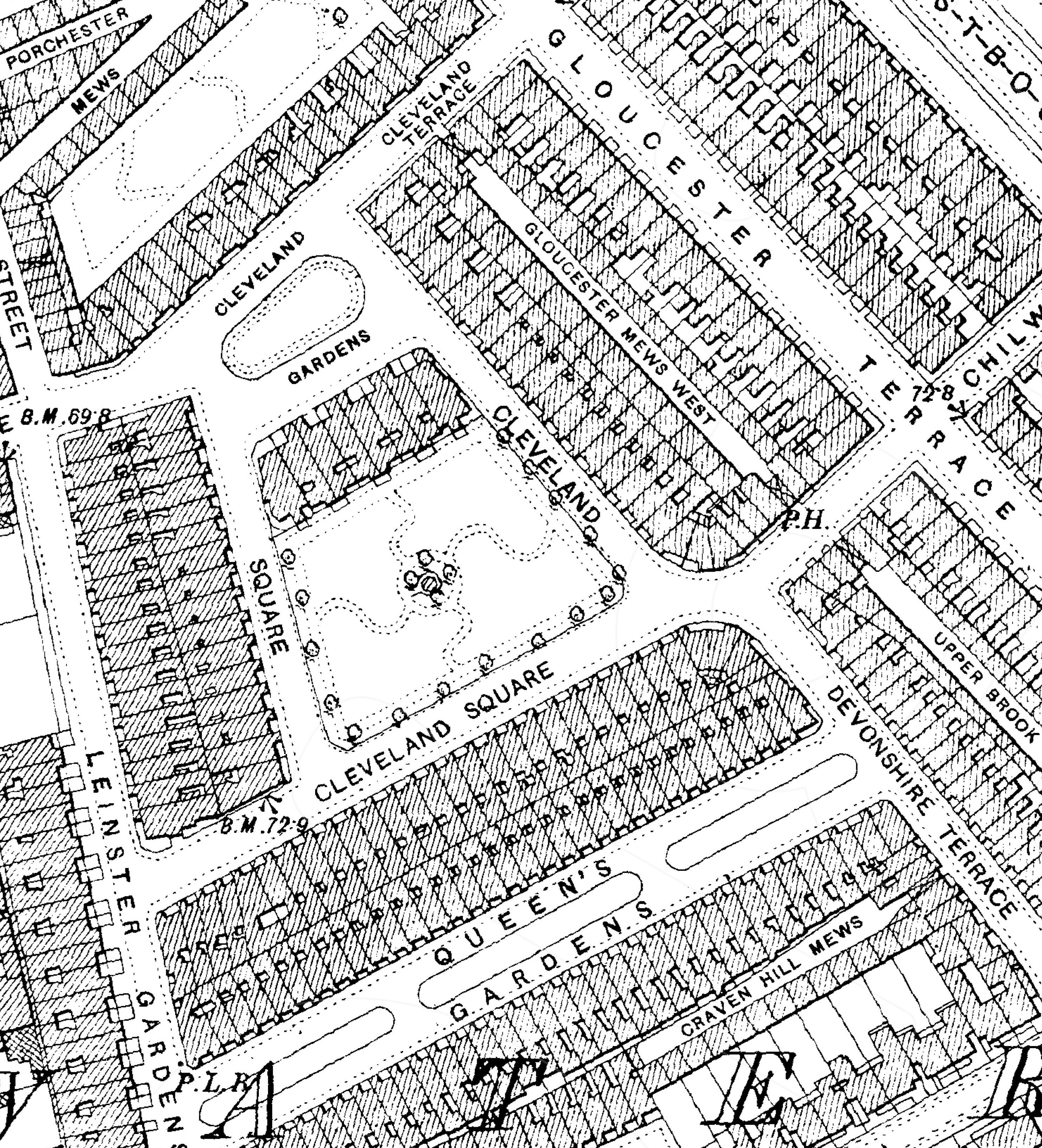
Queen's Gardens on an 1896 Ordnance Survey map showing the layout of the gardens

Queen's Gardens, Westminster is a garden square in the Bayswater district of the City of Westminster in London.

The square was built in the 1850s along with the rest of the area, another notable garden square being Cleveland Gardens, with all being built by William Frederick Cleveland of Maida Vale who developed many plots in Paddington and Bayswater.

Queen's Gardens was built around 1855.

== Notable residents ==
- Bishop Charles Ridgeway, 32 Queen's Gardens
- William Thornhill Tucker, writer and grandson of Governor of Bermuda. 16 Queen's Gardens
- Henry St George Tucker, financier of East India Company. 16 Queen's Gardens
- Sir Henry Seton-Karr, politician and explorer. 11 Queen's Gardens
- Major General Thomas Assheton Duke. 7 Queen's Gardens
- Sir Forrest Fulton, politician. 27 Queen's Gardens
