= Herefordshire Light Infantry =

Herefordshire Regiment Herefordshire Light Infantry
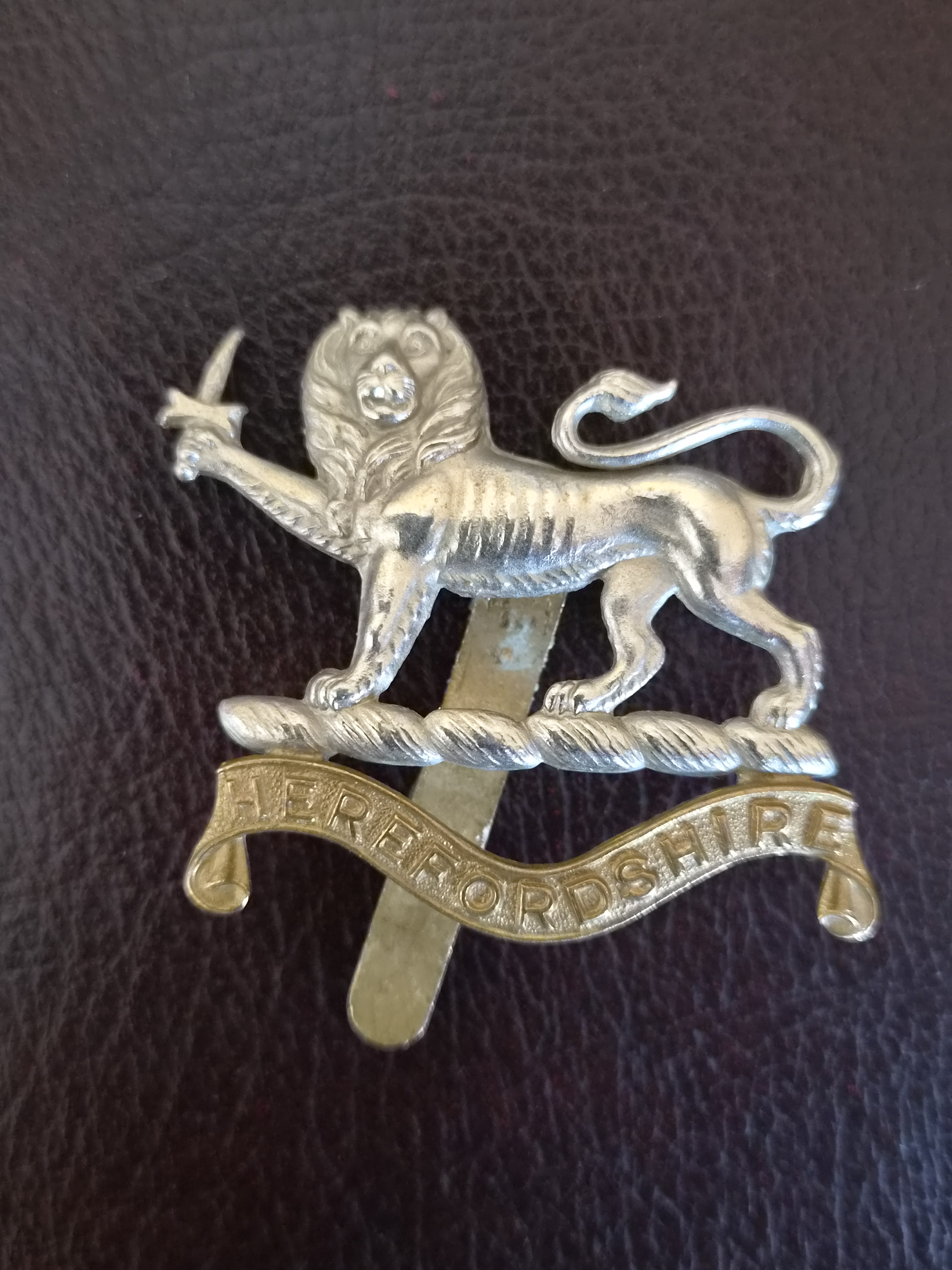
- Regimental cap badge of the Herefordshire Regiment
- Active: 1861–1967
- Country: United Kingdom
- Branch: British Army
- Type: Infantry
- Size: Regiment
- Engagements: World War I World War II

The Herefordshire Light Infantry was an infantry regiment of the British Army in existence from 1861 to 1967. The regiment had no lineal connection with the 36th (Herefordshire) Regiment of Foot.

== History ==
=== Formation ===
The 1st Administrative Battalion, Herefordshire and Radnorshire Rifle Volunteers was formed in 1861. It comprised the 1st to 8th Herefordshire Rifle Volunteer Corps and the 1st to 3rd Radnorshire Rifle Volunteer Corps, units of the Volunteer Force formed in the wake of the Crimean War. (In this instance Corps refers to a Company-sized unit of around 100 men, not the more modern use of the word.)

In 1880, it was re-designated 1st Herefordshire (Hereford and Radnor) Rifle Volunteers, the Corps were renamed Companies, and in 1881 it became the volunteer battalion of The King's (Shropshire Light Infantry). In 1908, it was transferred to the Territorial Force as the Herefordshire Battalion, The King's (Shropshire Light Infantry) (without the Radnorshire companies) with its headquarters at Harold Street in Hereford and in 1909 was renamed as the 1st Battalion, The Herefordshire Regiment.

=== First World War ===
In the First World War the regiment was expanded to three battalions. The 1st Battalion landed at Suvla Bay in Gallipoli in August 1915, and then having been evacuated in December 1915, transferred to Egypt.The battalion was redeployed to the Western Front in June 1918.

=== Second World War ===
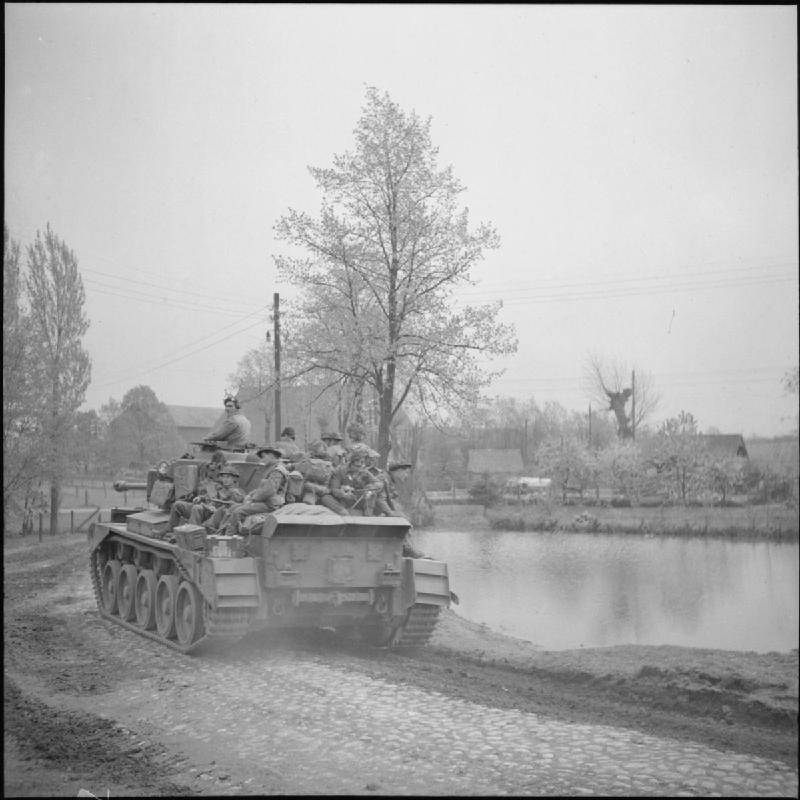
Comet tank of the 3rd Royal Tank Regiment carrying infantrymen of the 1st Battalion, Herefordshire Regiment, Germany, 2 May 1945.

In the Second World War, the 1st Battalion was divided to form the 1st and 2nd battalions. The 2nd Battalion was involved in home defence and training throughout the war, serving mainly with the 114th Infantry Brigade of the 38th (Welsh) Infantry Division.

The 1st Battalion formed part of 159th Brigade in the 53rd (Welsh) Infantry Division until 159th Brigade joined 11th Armoured Division in May 1942 and participated in the invasion of Normandy and Northwestern Europe. Some 223 men from the 1st Battalion were killed during operations in North-West Europe.

=== Post-War ===
In 1947, it was re-designated 1st Battalion, The Herefordshire Light Infantry. In 1967, as part of the re-organization of the Territorial Army, it was disbanded as a regiment.

== Regimental museum ==
The Herefordshire Regimental Museum focuses on the history of the regiment and is located in Suvla Barracks, Harold Street, Hereford. Collections include uniforms, photographs, medals and other memorabilia. Visitation is by appointment only.

== Battle honours ==
The regiment was awarded the following battle honours:

- South Africa 1900–02
- The Great War (3 battalions): Marne 1918, Soissonais-Ourcq, Ypres 1918, Courtrai, France and Flanders 1918, Suvla, Landing at Suvla, Scimitar Hill, Gallipoli 1915, Rumani, Egypt 1916–17, Gaza, El Mughar, Jerusalem, Tell 'Asur, Palestine 1917–18
- The Second World War (2 battalions): Odon, Defence of Rauray, Bourguébus Ridge, Cagny, Mont Pincon, Souleuvre, Falaise, Antwerp, Hechtal, Venraij, Venlo Pocket, Rhineland, Hochwald, Ibbenburen, Aller, North-West Europe 1944-45

== Sources ==
- Beckett, Ian (2003). Discovering English County Regiments. Shire. ISBN 978-0747-805069.
- Delaforce, Patrick (2010). The Black Bull: From Normandy to the Baltic with the 11th Armoured Division. Pen and Sword. ISBN 978-1848842281.
