= Herbertshire Castle =

Coordinates: 56°01′33″N 3°55′09″W

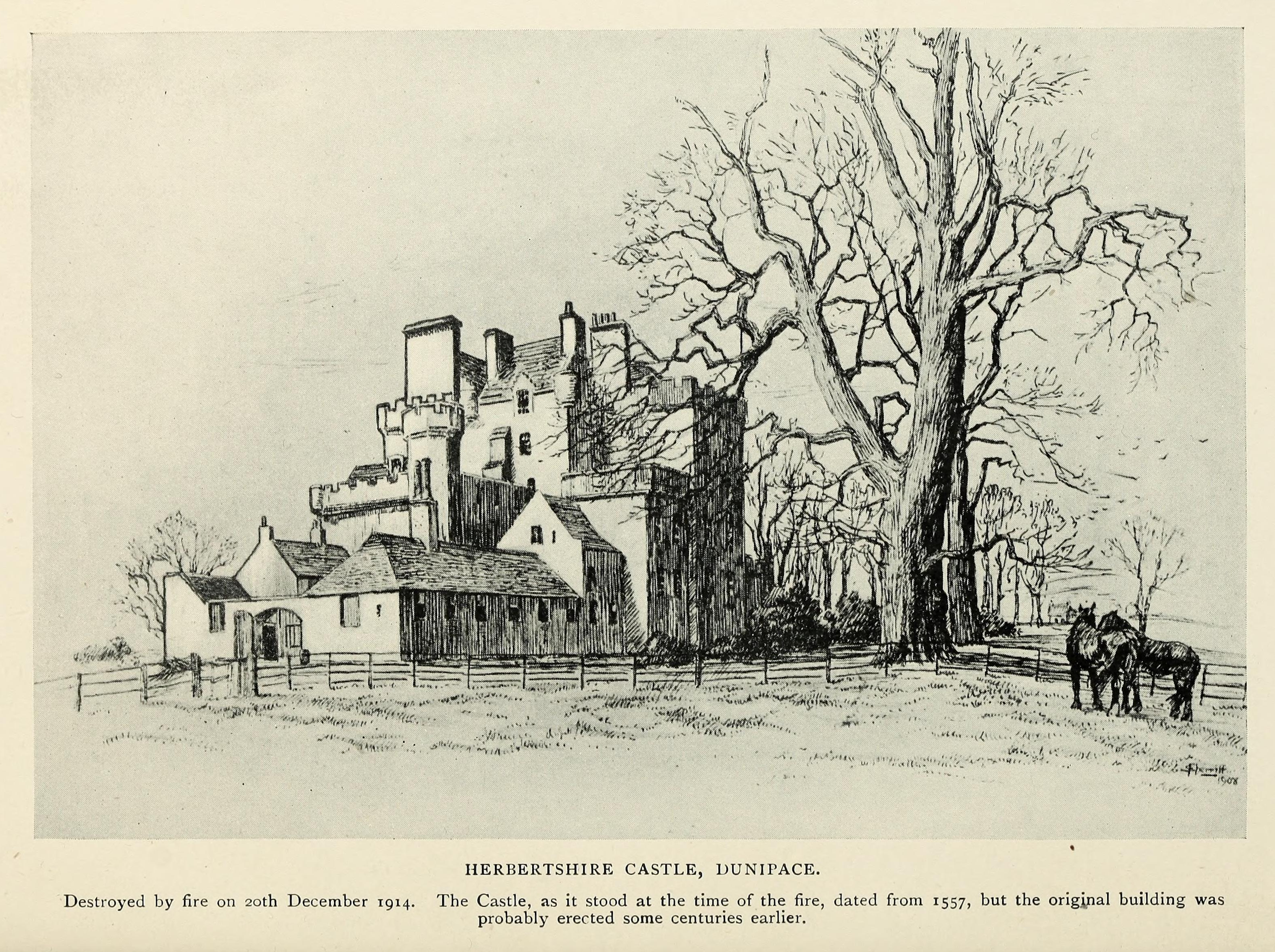
The castle as it appeared in 1908, a few years before its destruction by fire

Herbertshire Castle was a castle built in the Barony of Herbertshire in the early 15th century, located near Dunipace, Falkirk, central Scotland. It is said once to have been a royal hunting station. Its situation on elevated ground on the north bank of the River Carron was "very beautiful". It was in an L-plan, dominated by a four-storey, rectangular, battlemented tower. In 1889 it was described as a large and lofty structure, measuring 63'6" in length, including the wing, by 43'8" in breadth. The small limb forming the L was 26'2" wide and appears to have projected about 12'. It formed a landmark for miles around. It was badly damaged in a fatal fire in 1914 which claimed three lives, and lay in ruins until its demolition in the 1950s. The grounds remain, as Herbertshire Castle Park, also known as Denny Gala Park. Nothing remains of the castle but an area of low scarps and shallow depressions.

Herbertshire is believed to have taken its name from one Herbert de Camera, who donated tracts of land in Dunipace to Cambuskenneth Abbey about the year 1200. During the time that Herbert made the donations to the Abbey, the lands fell within the jurisdiction of the barony of Dunipace. After the donations, Herbertshire became the principal barony that remained. It was located within the county of Stirling. This was the principal barony of Dunipace and Denny. At the time of the Wars of Scottish Independence it was known as the Barony of Dunipace and it was not until some time after these that the name Herbertshire emerged.

In that early period the lairds of the barony were the de Morehams and, as his sons had both died in the wars, Sir Thomas de Moreham, the last laird, was succeeded by his granddaughter. She married John Gifford and they had four children – all girls. The youngest, Elizabeth, married John Douglas (1303–1350), son of James, Lord Douglas, and the estate went to them during the reign of David II of Scotland (1324–1371). In their charter the name Herbertshire is first found. John Douglas was killed by order of Sir David Barclay of Brechin some time before Shrove Tuesday in 1350. In 1369 the estate was in the hands of Archibald, Earl Douglas, and when his son, William, Lord of Nithsdale, married a daughter of King Robert II the lands were gifted to them.

Their daughter Egidia, married Henry Sinclair, Earl of Orkney and Lord of Rosslyn, and the estate passed to that couple in 1407. During the period of Sinclair ownership the castle was built. A charter of 1474 mentions the "lands and barony of Herbertshire with the castle and fortalice thereof", the first reference to a castle on the site.

The estate was bought by Alexander Livingstone, 1st Earl of Linlithgow in 1608. He then sold it to John Stirling, son of William Stirling of Achyle, in 1632. He was succeeded by William Stirling of Herbertshire (on record in the 1660s), George Stirling of Herbertshire (on record in the 1690s), and John Stirling of Herbertshire (d. 1754). In 1768 his daughter Jean Stirling (1719–1797), wife of James Erskine, Lord Alva, sold the estate to William Morehead (1737–1793) a founder of the Royal Society of Edinburgh.

The castle remained in the Morehead family for two or more generations, until sold by another William Morehead in 1835 to William Forbes, 2nd of Callendar, Conservative MP for Stirlingshire and son of William Forbes of Callendar, who had made his fortune from copper-bottoming ships for the Royal Navy.

The castle remained in the Forbes family for the rest of its existence. For a period in the late 19th century it was a boarding school, but it later returned to use as a residence for the Forbes family. The castle suffered a tragic and catastrophic fire on 20 December 1914. The fire started before 5 am, when the household was sound asleep. Most of the 24 occupants escaped. These included Mr and Mrs Charles William Forbes (4th of Callendar), the four Forbes daughters (Louise, Agnes, Margaret and Marion, aged 10 to 16) – after a dramatic rescue from the turret by ladder – and two maids who leaped across a 22-foot gap to an adjoining roof. However, three people died. Two of them were young guests, the sisters Cynthia Graham (14 years old) and Clare Graham (whose 16th birthday it was), visiting from nearby Airthrey Castle; their beautiful tomb can be found at Old Logie Kirk. The third was Mrs Forbes's companion Rachel Littlejohn, the daughter of a distinguished Edinburgh professor. These three were occupying bedrooms on the top floors. No available ladder could reach them, and the windows were barred. Because of the castle's location on high ground, the blaze could be seen for many miles around.

The castle, gutted by the fire, remained fittingly in ruins until its demolition in the 1950s.
