= Harold Street drill hall =

Former military installation in England

- Hereford
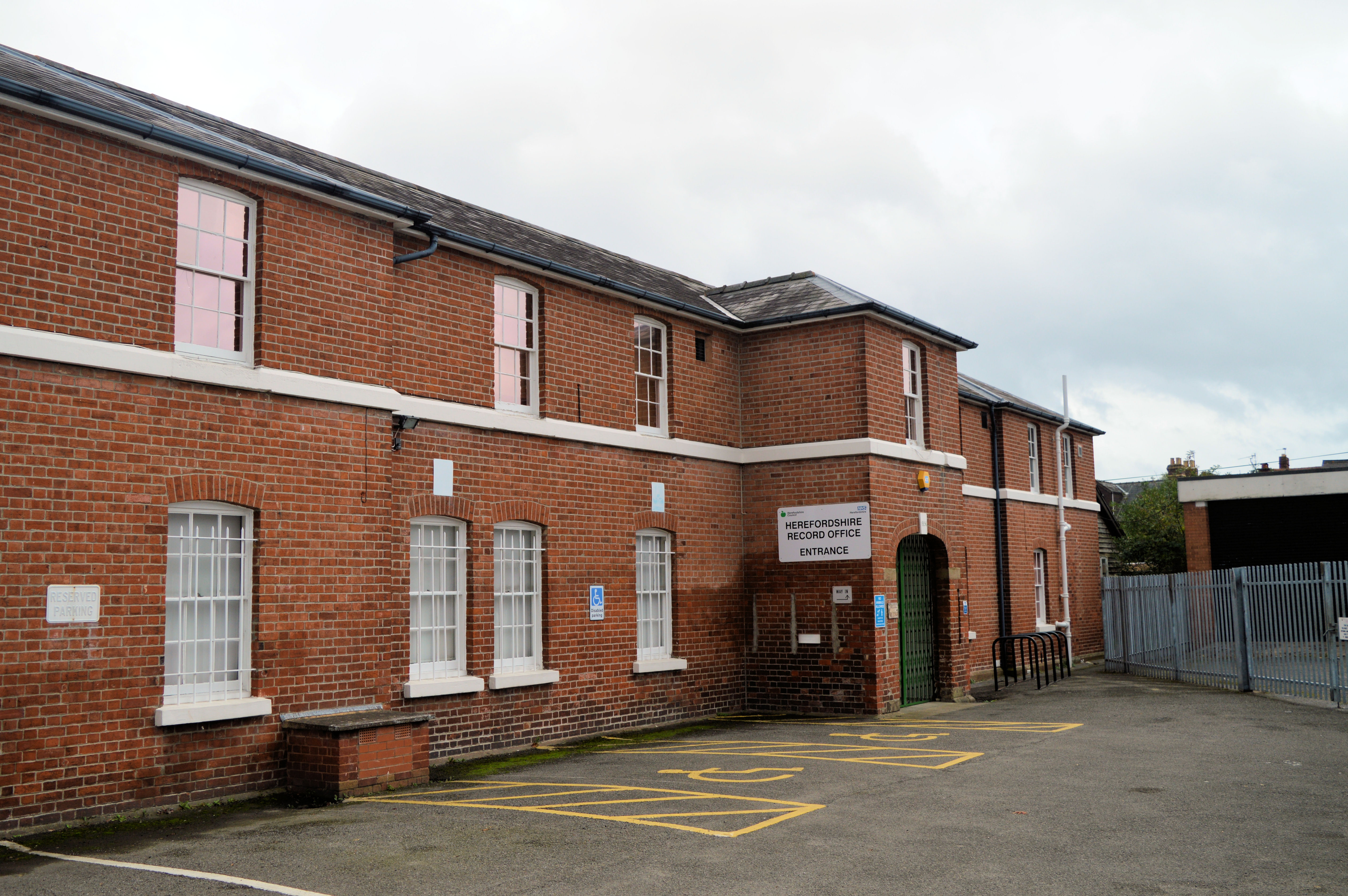
- Harold Street drill hall

Site information
- Type: Drill hall

Location
- Location within Herefordshire
- Coordinates: 52.05119°N 2.70467°W

Site history
- Built: 1856
- Built for: War Office
- In use: 1856-1960s

The Harold Street drill hall is a former military installation in Hereford, Herefordshire.

== History ==
The building was designed as a local militia barracks and was completed in around 1856. It was used by the Herefordshire Rifle Volunteer Corps from when it was formed in 1859. That unit evolved to become the 1st Herefordshire (Hereford and Radnor) Rifle Volunteers in 1880, the Herefordshire Battalion, The King's Shropshire Light Infantry in 1908 and the 1st Battalion, The Herefordshire Regiment in 1909. The battalion was mobilised at the drill hall in August 1914 before being deployed to Gallipoli and ultimately to the Western Front in June 1918. The drill hall was also used as the local headquarters for the Army Service Corps.

The 1st Battalion, The Herefordshire Regiment was renamed the 1st Battalion, The Herefordshire Light Infantry in 1947. After the battalion moved to a modern Territorial Army Centre nearby in the 1960s, the Harold Street drill hall was converted for use as the Herefordshire County Records Office. The Records Office moved to Fir Tree Lane in January 2014 and the drill hall is now empty.
