= Henry Buchanan (British Army officer) =

British Army general

Lieutenant-General Henry Buchanan CB
- Born: 1830
- Died: 7 October 1903 (aged 72–73)
- Military career
- Allegiance: United Kingdom
- Branch: British Army
- Rank: Lieutenant-General
- Commands: Eastern District.
- Conflicts: Crimean War
- Awards: Companion of the Order of the Bath

Lieutenant-General Henry James Buchanan CB (1830 – 7 October 1903) was a British Army officer who became General Officer Commanding Eastern District.

== Military career ==
Buchanan was commissioned as an ensign in the 47th Regiment of Foot on 14 June 1850. He fought at the Battle of Alma in September 1854 and the Battle of Inkerman in November 1854 as well as the Siege of Sevastopol during the Crimean War. He also served with the Jowaki expedition of 1877–1878. He went on to be Commander of the 3rd Brigade at Aldershot in January 1887 and General Officer Commanding Eastern District in January 1889.

He was also Colonel of the Norfolk Regiment from 1898 to his death.

Military offices
Preceded by Sir Evelyn Wood	GOC Eastern District; 1889–1892	Succeeded by John Glyn
