= Hanna (given name) =

Hanna is a feminine given name of Hebrew origin. Alternative spellings include Hana and Chana.

Notable people and characters with the name include:

== People ==
- Hanna-Katri Aalto (born 1978), Finnish tennis player
- Hanna Abboud, Syrian writer
- Hanna Abrazhevich (born 2002), Belarusian pair skater
- Hanna Abu-Hanna (1928–2022), Palestinian writer
- Hanna Adler (1859–1947), Danish school principal and physicist
- Hanna Adolfsen (1872–1926), Norwegian politician and women's activist
- Hanna Åhlén (born 1994), Swedish handball player
- Hanna Ahroni (born 1933), Israeli singer
- Hanna Akiva (born 1974), Israeli social activist
- Hanna Alström (born 1981), Swedish actress
- Hanna Alwan (born 1954), Lebanese bishop
- Hanna Andersin (1861–1914), Finnish educator
- Hanna Antonieva (born 1961), Ukrainian politician
- Hanna Ardéhn (born 1995), Swedish actress
- Hanna Arkhipova (born 1939), Ukrainian politician
- Hanna Aronsson Elfman (born 2002), Swedish alpine skier
- Hanna Arsenych-Baran (1970–2021), Ukrainian writer of prose, novels and poetry
- Hanna Astrup Larsen (1873–1945), Norwegian-American writer, editor and translator
- Hanna Atik (born 1959), Lebanese politician
- Hanna Azoulay Hasfari (born 1960), Israeli actor and screenwriter
- Hanna Bakuła (born 1950), Polish painter
- Hanna Balabanova (born 1969), Ukrainian sprint canoer
- Hanna Banaszak (born 1957), Polish jazz singer and poet
- Hanna Barakat (born 1999), Palestinian-American runner
- Hanna Marie Barker (born 1996), American soccer player
- Hanna Barker (born 1996), American soccer player
- Hanna Barvinok (1828–1911), Ukrainian writer and folklorist
- Hanna Barysevich (1888–2007), claimed to be the oldest female resident of Belarus
- Hanna Bazhko (born 1998), Belarusian rhythmic gymnast
- Hanna Beattie (born 1995), American ice hockey forward
- Hanna Bekker vom Rath (1893–1983), German painter
- Hanna Ben Dov (1919–2008), Israeli painter
- Hanna Bennison (born 2002), Swedish footballer
- Hanna Berger (1910–1962), Austrian dancer and choreographer
- Hanna Bergstrøm (1885–1948), Norwegian trade unionist and politician
- Hanna Bertilsdotter Rosqvist, Swedish academic
- Hanna Bezliudna (born 1972), Ukrainian journalist
- Hanna Bieber-Böhm (1851–1910), German feminist and pioneer of social work
- Hanna Louisa Bissiw (born 1972), Ghanaian politician
- Hanna Blomstrand (born 1996), Swedish handball player
- Hanna Bogucka (born 1965), Polish telecommunications engineer
- Hanna Bohman, Canadian former model
- Hanna Bondar (born 1975), Ukrainian architect and politician
- Hanna Borysivna Korsun (born 1991), Ukrainian singer known professionally as Maruv
- Hanna Boubezari (born 1998), Algerian footballer
- Hanna Brooman (1809–1887), Swedish composer, translator and educator
- Hanna Bunton (born 1995), Canadian ice hockey forward
- Hanna Burmystrova (born 1977), Ukrainian handball player
- Hanna Busz (born 1940), Polish volleyball player
- Hanna Butenschøn (1851–1928), Norwegian author
- Hanna Cavinder (born 2001), American social media personality and former basketball player
- Hanna Chan (born 1993), Hong Kong model and actress
- Hanna Chang (disambiguation), several people
- Hanna Helena Chrzanowska (1902–1973), Polish nurse and Benedictine oblate, beatified by the Catholic Church in 2018
- Hanna Chubach (1941–2019), Ukrainian poet
- Hanna Czeczott (1888–1982), Polish botanist
- Hanna Daglund (born 1994), Swedish handball player
- Hanna Damasio (born 1942), Portuguese professor of psychology and neurology
- Hanna Davydova (born 1998), Ukrainian weightlifter
- Hanna Deinhard (1912–1984), German American art historian
- Hanna Demydova (born 1987), Ukrainian triple jumper
- Hanna Dimishky (1847–1912), Syrian Christian missionary and educator
- Hanna Diyab, Syrian writer and storyteller in the 18th-century
- Hanna Dmyterko (1893–1981), Ukrainian soldier
- Hanna Dodiuk-Kenig (born 1948), Israeli scientist, professor and inventor
- Hanna Dorsin (born 1973), Swedish comedian
- Hanna Drabenia (born 1987), Belarusian race walker
- Hanna Dudzenkova (born 1994), Belarusian rhythmic gymnast
- Hanna Dzerkal (born 1987), Ukrainian swimmer
- Hanna Eady, Palestinian actor
- Hanna Eigel (born 1939), Austrian figure skater
- Hanna El-Nachar, Lebanon international rugby league footballer
- Hanna Ereńska-Barlo (born 1946), Polish chess player
- Hanna Erikson (born 1990), Swedish cross-country skier
- Hanna Eriksson (disambiguation), several people
- Hanna Eshel (1926–2023), Israel-born sculptor
- Hanna Etula (born 1981), Finnish sport shooter
- Hanna Fahl (born 1978), Swedish music journalist and translator
- Hanna Falk (born 1989), Swedish cross-country skier
- Hanna Farah-Kufer Bir'im, Palestinian visual artist, builder and architect
- Hanna Faulhaber (born 2004), American freestyle skier
- Hanna Fenichel (1897–1975), German-American child psychologist
- Hanna Ferlin (1870–1947), Swedish photographer and suffragist
- Hanna Ferm (born 2000), Swedish singer
- Hanna Fogelström (born 1990), Swedish handball player
- Hanna Folkesson (born 1988), Swedish footballer
- Hanna Foltyn-Kubicka (born 1950), Polish politician
- Hanna Katrín Friðriksson (born 1964), Icelandic politician and businesswoman
- Hanna Frosterus-Segerstråle (1867–1946), Finnish artist and writer
- Hanna Fuchs-Robettin (1894–1964), Austro-Hungarian mistress of Alban Berg
- Hanna Gabriels (born 1983), Costa Rican boxer
- Hanna Gallo (born 1956), American politician
- Hanna Gedin (born 1978), Swedish politician
- Hanna Gharib (born 1953), Lebanese communist leader
- Hanna Glas (born 1993), Swedish footballer
- Hanna Grages (1922–2010), German gymnast
- Hanna Granfelt (1884–1952), Finnish opera singer
- Hanna Granitzki (born 1997), German field hockey player
- Hanna Greally (1924–1987), Irish woman incarcerated for two decades
- Hanna Green (born 1994), American middle-distance runner
- Hannah Grisham (born 2000), American racing driver
- Hanna Grobler (born 1981), Finnish high jumper
- Hanna Gronkiewicz-Waltz (born 1952), Polish politician and lawyer
- Hanna Grönvall (1879–1953), Swedish politician
- Hanna Gucwińska (1932–2023), Polish politician
- Hanna Guðrún Stefánsdóttir (born 1979), Icelandic handball player
- Hanna Gunnarsson (born 1983), Swedish politician
- Hanna Haidukevich (born 2001), Belarusian rhythmic gymnast
- Hanna Hall (born 1984), American actress
- Hanna Hamdi (born 1995), Tunisian footballer
- Hanna Hammarström (1829–1909), Swedish inventor
- Hanna Hancharova (born 1992), Belarusian trampoline gymnast
- Hanna Haponova (born 1985), Ukrainian table tennis player
- Hanna Harrell (born 2003), American figure skater
- Hanna Hartman (born 1961), Swedish composer, sound artist and performer
- Hanna Hatsko-Fedusova (born 1990), Ukrainian javelin thrower
- Hanna Havrylets (1958–2022), Ukrainian composer
- Hanna Hedlund (born 1975), Swedish singer
- Hanna Hellquist (born 1980), Swedish journalist, TV host and writer
- Hanna Hemilä (born 1960), Finnish film producer, director and writer
- Hanna Henning (1884–1925), German film director, producer and screenwriter
- Hanna Herbst (born 1990), German journalist and author
- Hanna Herman (born 1959), Ukrainian politician
- Hanna Hermansson (born 1989), Swedish runner
- Hanna Hertelendy (1919–2008), American actress
- Hanna Herzog, Israeli researcher and professor of sociology
- Hanna Hiekal (born 2002), Egyptian synchronized swimmer
- Hanna Hipp, Polish lyric mezzo-soprano
- Hanna von Hoerner (1942–2014), German astrophysicist and physicist
- Hanna Hoffmann, Norwegian-born Danish sculptor, silversmith and weaver
- Hanna Holborn Gray (born 1930), American historian and professor
- Hanna Holopainen (born 1976), Finnish politician
- Hanna Homonai (born 1979), Ukrainian TV news anchor
- Hanna Honthy (1893–1978), Hungarian opera singer and actress
- Hanna Hopko (born 1982), Ukrainian politician
- Hanna Huskova (born 1992), Belarusian freestyle skier
- Hanna Ibarra (born 1989), Filipino footballer
- Hanna Ihedioha (born 1997), German snowboarder
- Hanna Jaff (born 1986), American born Mexican-Kurd politician, philanthropist, human rights activist, and author
- Hanna Jallouf (born 1952), Syrian prelate
- Hanna Jaltner (born 1976), Swedish breaststroke swimmer
- Hanna Jarkiewicz (born 1954), Polish rower
- Hanna Jensen (born 1973), Faroese high school teacher and liberal politician
- Hanna Jessen (1907–1973), Norwegian sculptor, lecturer and non-fiction author
- Hanna Johannesson, Swedish professor
- Hanna Johansen (1939–2023), Swiss author
- Hanna Johansson (born 1985), Swedish cyclist
- Hanna Jubran, Palestinian Arab Israeli sculptor
- Hanna Kanapatskaya (born 1976), Belarusian politician, lawyer and entrepreneur
- Hanna Karasiova (equestrian) (born 1984), Belarusian dressage rider
- Hanna Karasiova (born 1978), Belarusian archer
- Hanna Karhinen (1878–1938), Finnish politician and member of parliament
- Hanna Karjalainen (born 1980), Finnish actress
- Hanna María Karlsdóttir (born 1948), Icelandic actress
- Hanna Karnaushenko (born 1953), Ukrainian rower
- Hanna Karrer (born 2008), Austrian snowboarder
- Hanna Kay, Australian artist
- Hanna Kebinger (born 1997), German biathlete
- Hanna Kisteleki (born 1991), Hungarian water polo player
- Hanna Björg Kjartansdóttir (born 1974), Icelandic basketball player
- Hanna Klarenbeek, Dutch art historian and curator
- Hanna Klaus, American physician and founder of TeenSTAR
- Hanna Klein (born 1993), German middle-distance runner
- Hanna Marie Klek (born 1995), German chess player
- Hanna Klinga (born 1989), Swedish sailor
- Hanna Knyazyeva-Minenko (born 1989), Israeli triple jumper and long jumper
- Hanna Kohonen (1885–1944), Finnish politician
- Hanna Kokko, Finnish scientist
- Hanna Kolb (born 1991), German cross-country skier
- Hanna Konsek (born 1987), Polish footballer
- Hanna Kosonen (born 1976), Finnish politician and ski orienteer
- Hanna Krall (born 1935), Polish writer
- Hanna Krasnapiorka (1925–2000), Belarusian journalist and writer
- Hanna Krasnoshlyk (born 1996), Ukrainian diver
- Hanna Kravchenko (born 1986), Ukrainian rower
- Hanna Birna Kristjánsdóttir (born 1966), Icelandic politician
- Hanna Kroeger (1913–1998), American health food and alternative medicine pioneer
- Hanna Kryvolap (born 1977), Ukrainian painter
- Hanna Kulenty (born 1961), Polish composer
- Hanna Kunath (1909–1994), German aviator
- Hanna Kuoppala (born 1975), Finnish ice hockey player
- Hanna Kvanmo (1926–2005), Norwegian politician
- Hanna Lachert (1927–2021), Polish architect
- Hanna Laiho (born 1975), Finnish rhythmic gymnast
- Hanna Laptsionak (born 1990), Belarusian cyclist
- Hanna-Maari Latvala (born 1987), Finnish sprinter
- Hanna-Renate Laurien (1928–2010), German politician
- Hanna Laursen (1936–2020), Danish diver
- Hanna Lehtinen (born 1958), Finnish diplomat
- Hanna Lewis (1931–2022), American editor and translator
- Hanna Leybrand (1945–2017), German writer
- Hanna Lichman (born 1978), Ukrainian politician
- Hanna Lindberg (1865–1951), Swedish politician, first woman on a communal council (1910)
- Hanna Lindblad (born 1980), Swedish singer
- Hanna Linderstål, Swedish business executive and entrepreneur
- Hanna Lindholm (born 1979), Swedish long-distance runner
- Hanna Lindmark (1860–1941), Swedish businesswoman
- Hanna Lis (born 1970), Polish journalist
- Hanna Liubakova, Belarusian journalist and researcher
- Hanna Ljungberg (born 1979), Swedish soccer player
- Hanna Ludwig (1918–2014), German contralto
- Hanna Lundberg (born 2002), Swedish orienteering competitor
- Hanna Lundell (born 1998), Swedish footballer
- Hanna Lundkvist (born 2002), Swedish footballer
- Hanna Lundqvist (born 1990), Swedish footballer
- Hanna Lypkivska (1967–2021), Ukrainian theatrologist
- Hanna Malewska (1911–1983), Polish historian and writer
- Hanna Maliar (born 1978), former Ukrainian deputy minister of defense
- Hanna Malyshchyk (born 1994), Belarusian hammer thrower
- Hanna Mangan-Lawrence (born 1991), British-Australian actress
- Hanna Mäntylä (born 1974), Finnish politician
- Hanna Marcussen (born 1977), Norwegian politician
- Hanna Margońska, Polish botanist
- Hanna Mariën (born 1982), Belgian sprinter
- Hanna Marklund (born 1977), Swedish former football player
- Hanna Maron (1923–2014), Israeli actress
- Hanna Marusava (born 1978), Belarusian archer
- Hanna-Leena Mattila (born 1968), Finnish politician
- Hanna Mazgunova (born 1985), Belarusian discus thrower
- Hanna Melnychenko (born 1983), Ukrainian heptathlete
- Hanna Mergies (born 1984), Polish snooker player
- Hanna Mierzejewska (1950–2015), Polish politician
- Hanna Mikhail (1935–?), Palestinian scholar and activist
- Hanna Miluska (born 1984), Swiss swimmer
- Hanna Mina (1924–2018), Syrian writer
- Hanna Motrechko (born 1965), Soviet rower
- Hanna Muller (born 1999), South African water polo player
- Hanna-Elisabeth Müller (born 1985), German soprano
- Hanna Muralt Müller (born 1947), Swiss politician
- Hanna Nasser (1937–2015), mayor of Bethlehem
- Hanna Nasser (academic) (born 1935), Palestinian academic and political figure
- Hanna Németh (born 1998), Hungarian footballer
- Hanna Neumann (1914–1971), German-born mathematician
- Hanna Newcombe (1922–2011), Canadian peace activist
- Hanna Nifantava (born 1999), Belarusian speed skater
- Hanna Nilsson (born 1992), Swedish cyclist
- Hanna Nooni (born 1984), Swedish tennis player
- Hanna Novosad (born 1990), Ukrainian politician
- Hanna Öberg (born 1995), Swedish biathlete
- Hanna Oftedal Sagosen (born 1994), Norwegian handball player
- Hanna Rún Óladóttir (born 1990), Icelandic ballroom and Latin dancer
- Hanna Olsen (1889–1990), Swedish fencer
- Hanna Olsson (born 1999), Swedish ice hockey player
- Hanna Onyschenko (born 1984), Ukrainian politician and lawyer
- Hanna Orthmann (born 1998), German volleyball player
- Hanna Ouchterlony (1838–1924), Swedish officer of the Salvation Army
- Hanna Ożogowska (1904–1995), Polish novelist and poet
- Hanna Pakarinen (born 1981), Finnish pop singer
- Hanna Parviainen (1874–1938), Finnish woman trade counselor
- Hanna Pauli (1864–1940), Swedish painter
- Hanna Paulsberg (born 1987), Norwegian jazz composer and musician
- Hanna Percy (born 2007), American snowboarder
- Hanna Persson (born 1996), Swedish footballer
- Hanna von Pestalozza (1867–1963), German writer
- Hanna Petros (1896–1958), Iraqi Assyrian musician
- Hanna Pettersson (born 1987), Swedish football striker
- Hanna Pickard (born 1972), Canadian philosopher and academic
- Hanna Fenichel Pitkin (1931–2023), American political theorist
- Hanna Plotitsyna (born 1987), Ukrainian hurdler
- Hanna Polak, Polish director, cinematographer and producer
- Hanna Polishchuk, Ukrainian para swimmer
- Hanna Popaja (born 2002), Swedish handball player
- Hanna Poulsen (born 1984), Finnish model
- Hanna Poznikhirenko (born 1994), Ukrainian tennis player
- Hanna Prakatsen (born 1992), Russian rower
- Hanna Prusakowska (born 1962), Polish fencer
- Hanna Putz (born 1987), Austrian photographer
- Hanna Pylväinen, American novelist and educator
- Hanna Pysmenska (born 1991), Ukrainian diver
- Hanna Ralph (1888–1978), German actress
- Hanna Ramadini (born 1995), Indonesian badminton player
- Hanna Rambe (born 1940), Indonesian writer
- Hanna Rautenbach (1889–1981), German politician
- Hanna van Recklinghausen (1332–?), Dutch banker
- Hanna Reisler, Israeli physicist
- Hanna Reitsch (1912–1979), German test pilot
- Hanna Resvoll-Holmsen (1873–1943), Norwegian biologist
- Hanna Rieber (1927–2014), Romanian-born Israeli actress
- Hanna Rizatdinova (born 1993), Ukrainian rhythmic gymnast
- Hanna Romanazzi (born 1996), Brazilian actress and model
- Hanna Rönnberg (1862–1946), Finnish painter
- Hanna T. Rose (1909–1976), American curator
- Hanna Rosin (born 1970), Israeli-born American writer
- Hanna Rosvall (born 2000), Swedish swimmer
- Hanna Rovina (1892–1980), Israeli actress and original "First Lady of Hebrew Theatre"
- Hanna Rucker (1923–1982), German actress
- Hanna Rudzka-Cybisowa (1897–1988), Polish artist
- Hanna Rulyova (born 1986), Ukrainian basketball player
- Hanna Rycharska (born 1988), Polish handball player
- Hanna Rydh (1891–1964), Swedish archaeologist, politician and women rights activist
- Hanna Sahlfeld-Singer (born 1943), Swiss politician
- Hanna Salameh, Jordanian architect
- Hanna Samson, Polish writer, psychologist and feminist
- Hanna Sandström (born 1995), Swedish footballer
- Hanna Sandtner (1900–1958), German politician
- Hanna Sarkkinen (born 1988), Finnish politician
- Hanna Scheuring (born 1965), Swiss actress and theatre director
- Hanna Schmitz (born 1976), Swedish actress
- Hanna Schwamborn (born 1992), German actress
- Hanna Schwarz (born 1943), German mezzo-soprano and contralto
- Hanna Schygulla (born 1943), German actress and singer
- Hanna Segal (1918–2011), British psychologist
- Hanna-Maria Seppälä (born 1984), Finnish swimmer
- Hanna Shabatura (1914–2004), Ukrainian artist
- Hanna Shcherba (born 1982), Belarusian-French swimmer
- Hanna Sheehy-Skeffington (1877–1946), Irish feminist, wife of Francis Sheehy-Skeffington
- Hanna Shelekh (born 1993), Ukrainian athlete
- Hanna Shevchuk (born 1996), Ukrainian race walker
- Hanna Shvaiba (born 2000), Belarusian rhythmic gymnast
- Hanna Shybayeva (born 1979), Dutch pianist
- Hanna Siniora (born 1937), Palestinian publisher and politician
- Hanna Skalska-Szemioth (1921–1964), Polish composer and journalist
- Hanna Skandera, American politician
- Hanna Sköld (born 1997), Swedish ice hockey player
- Hanna Skydan (born 1992), Ukrainian-Azerbaijani hammer thrower
- Hanna Śleszyńska (born 1959), Polish actress
- Hanna Slipenko (born 1973), Ukrainian cross-country skier
- Hanna Snellman (born 1961), Finnish ethnologist and professor
- Hanna Sola (born 1996), Belarusian biathlete
- Hanna Solovey (born 1992), Ukrainian racing cyclist
- Hanna Stadnik (1929–2020), Polish activist
- Hanna Stankówna (1938–2020), Polish actress
- Hanna Steinmüller (born 1993), German politician
- Hanna Stjärne (born 1969), Swedish journalist and media executive
- Hanna Sturm (1891–1984), Austrian labor rights, peace and Nazi resistance activist
- Hanna Styrell (1842–1904), Swedish actress
- Hanna Suchocka (born 1946), Prime Minister of Poland from 1992 to 1993
- Hanna Sumska (1933–2022), Ukrainian actress
- Hanna Świda-Ziemba (1930–2012), Polish sociologist
- Hanna Szujó (born 2004), Hungarian artistic gymnast
- Hanna Talkanitsa (born 1987), Belarusian cyclist
- Hanna Teerijoki (born 1963), Finnish multi-sport athlete
- Hanna Terry (born 1990), Swedish footballer
- Hanna Tervanotko, Finnish-born Canadian historian of religion
- Hanna Tetteh (born 1967), Ghanaian politician
- Hanna Thompson (born 1983), American fencer
- Hanna Thuvik (born 2002), Swedish ice hockey forward
- Hanna Titimets (born 1989), Ukrainian hurdler
- Hanna Traukova (born 2001), Belarusian artistic gymnast
- Hanna Tserakh (born 1998), Belarusian cyclist
- Hanna Turchynova (born 1970), former First Lady of Ukraine
- Hanna Vandenbussche (born 1987), Belgian long-distance runner
- Hanna Varis (born 1959), Finnish artist
- Hanna Vasilionak (born 1983), Belarusian modern pentathlete
- Hanna Vasylenko (born 1986), Ukrainian sports wrestler
- Hanna Vehkamäki (born 1969), Finnish physicist and academic
- Hanna Verboom (born 1983), Dutch actress
- Hanna Veres (1928–2003), Ukrainian weaver
- Hanna van Vliet (born 1992), Dutch actress
- Hanna Vollenhoven (1889–1972), Dutch composer and pianist
- Hanna Waag (1904–1995), German actress
- Hanna Wagenius (born 1988), Swedish blogger and politician
- Hanna Wallach, computational social scientist
- Hanna Walter (born 1939), Austrian figure skater
- Hanna Walz (1918–1997), German politician
- Hanna Weil, German-born British artist
- Hanna Westerén (born 1981), politician and Member of the Parliament of Sweden
- Hanna Westrin (born 1991), Swedish swimmer
- Hanna-Marie Weydahl (1922–2016), Norwegian pianist
- Hanna Panna Wiesner (born 2004), Hungarian rhythmic gymnast
- Hanna Wigh (born 1986), Swedish politician
- Hanna Winge (1838–1896), Swedish painter
- Hanna Winsnes (1789–1872), Norwegian poet, novelist and cookbook writer
- Hanna Wolf (1908–1999), East German historian and politician
- Hanna Yablonka (born 1950), Israeli historian and scholar
- Hanna Yablonska (1981–2011), Ukrainian playwright and poet
- Hanna Yanushevych (1907–1983), Ukrainian actress
- Hanna Yttereng (born 1991), Norwegian handball player
- Hanna Yusuf (1992–2019), English television presenter
- Hanna Zajc (born 1987), Swedish taekwondo practitioner
- Hanna Zavecz (born 1985), Australian basketball player
- Hanna Zboroń (born 1956), Polish chess player
- Hanna Zdanowska (born 1959), Polish politician
- Hanna Zembrzuska (1934–2023), Polish actress
- Hanna Zetterberg (born 1973), Swedish politician and actress
- Hanna Zora (1939–2016), Chaldean Catholic bishop

== Fictional characters ==
- Hanna, title character in the film bearing her name and the TV series based on it. Portrayed by Saoirse Ronan (film) and Esmé Creed-Miles (series)
- Hanna Marin, character from the TV and book series Pretty Little Liars and in the TV series, portrayed by Ashley Benson
- Hanna Jensen, character from the novel Baby Teeth by Zoje Stage
