= Kunath (surname) =

Kunath is a German surname. Notable people with the surname include:

- Arthur Kunath (1914-1995), German military officer
- Friedrich Kunath (born 1974), German artist
- Hanna Kunath (1909–1994), German pilot
- Jens Kunath (born 1967), German footballer
