= Herbst =

Herbst is the German word for autumn or fall.

Herbst may also refer to:

== Surnames ==
- Christoph Maria Herbst (born 1966), German actor and comedian
- Clarissa Herbst (born 1981), German politician
- Eduard Herbst (1820–1892), Austrian jurist and statesman
- Hanna Herbst (born 1990), German journalist
- Irné Herbst (born 1993), South African rugby player
- János Herbst (1956–2015), Hungarian politician
- Jess Herbst (born 1958), American politician
- Johann Andreas Herbst (1588–1666), German composer
- Johann Friedrich Wilhelm Herbst (1743–1807), German biologist
- John Herbst (disambiguation), multiple people
- Josephine Herbst (1892–1969), American novelist
- Kristina Herbst (born 1977), German politician
- Manasse Herbst (1913–1997), Austrian-German actor and singer
- Niclas Herbst (born 1973), German politician
- Rebecca Herbst (born 1977), American actress
- Reinfried Herbst (born 1978), Austrian skier
- Riley Herbst (born 1999), American NASCAR driver
- Sabine Herbst (born 1974), German swimmer
- Sharon Tyler Herbst, American food and wine author
- Thomas Herbst (footballer) (born 1962), German football player and manager
- Thomas Herbst (painter) (1848-1915), German painter
- Torsten Herbst (born 1973), German politician
- Wiehahn Herbst (born 1988), South African rugby player

== Other uses ==
- Herbst Gaming, gas station and casino operator using the name of "Terrible Herbst"
- Herbst Theatre, an auditorium in the War Memorial and Performing Arts Center in the Civic Center, San Francisco, USA
- Herbst maneuver, an aerobatic maneuver named after Wolfgang Herbst
- Herbst, Indiana, a small town in the United States
- Corpuscles of Herbst, avian mechanoreceptors
