= Pestalozza =

Surname

Pestalozza is a surname. It may refer to:

- Alberto Pestalozza (c. 1851–8 June 1934) composer (with Carlo Tiochet) and published a popular Piedmontese song, "Ciribiribin", in 1898
- Antonio Pestalozza (1784–1865), Italian politician
- Hanna von Pestalozza (actually Brunhilde Countess von Schlippenbach; * (1877 —1963), German writer
