= Helmut Poppe =

German military officer (1926–1979)

General Helmut Poppe
- Born: 8 October 1926; Niederhannsdorf (Province of Lower Silesia), Prussia, Weimar Republic
- Died: 26 July 1979 (aged 52); East Berlin, German Democratic Republic
- Burial place: Zentralfriedhof Friedrichsfelde; 52°30′56″N 13°30′38″E
- Military career
- Allegiance: East Germany
- Branch: Land Forces of the National People's Army
- Service years: 1956–1979
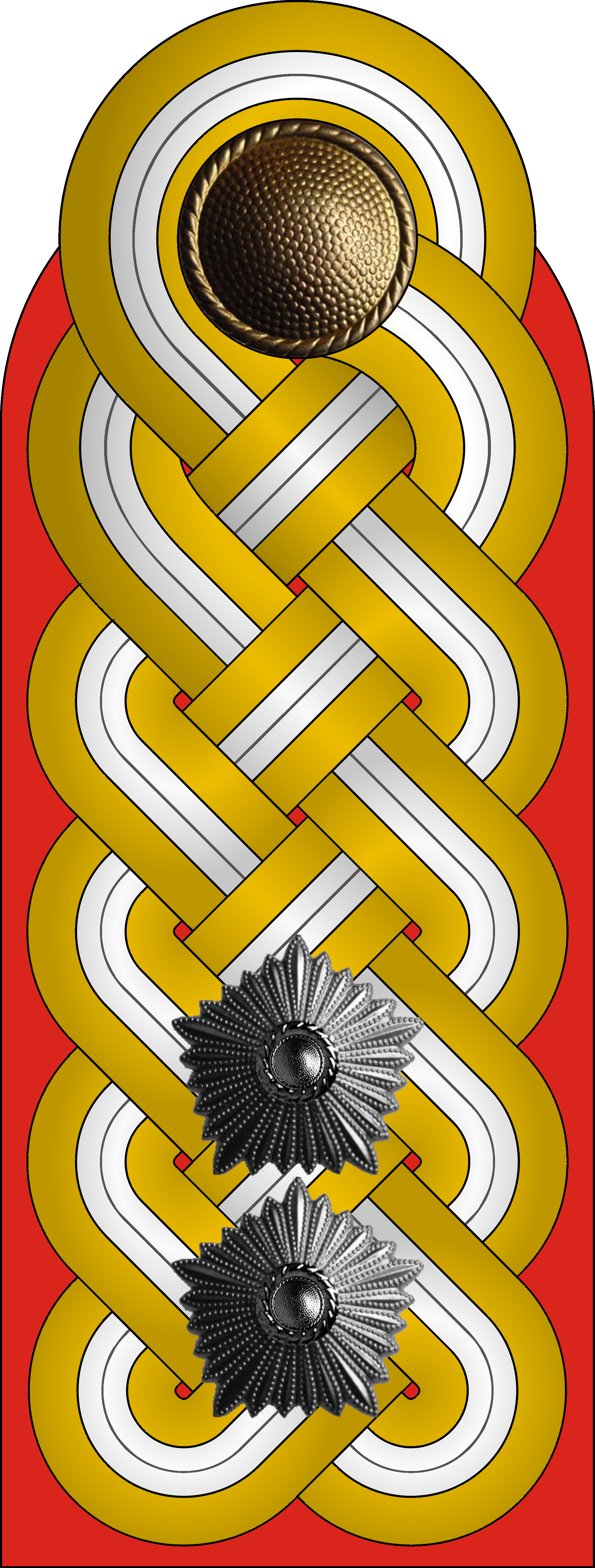
- Rank: Generalleutnant
- Commands: City Commandant of East Berlin (1962–1971); Chief of the Rear Area Services (1972–1979)
- Awards: Patriotic Order of Merit in gold

Helmut Poppe (Niederhannsdorf, 8 October 1926 – East Berlin, 26 July 1979) was a German military officer and a Generalleutnant of the East German National People's Army (NVA). He served as the first East German City Commandant of East Berlin from 22 August 1962 to 31 May 1971, as the Chief of the Rear Area Services of the NVA from 15 September 1972 until his death, and as Deputy Minister of National Defence from 1972 to 1979.

== Literature ==
- Klaus Froh; Rüdiger Wenzke (2000), Die Generale und Admirale der NVA. Ein biographisches Handbuch (in German) (4. ed.), Berlin: Ch. Links, ISBN 3-86153-209-3

Military offices
Preceded by Andrey Soloviev	City Commandant of East Berlin; 22 August 1962 – 31 May 1971	Succeeded by Arthur Kunath
Preceded by Walter Allenstein	Chief of the Rear Area Services of the National People's Army; 15 September 1972 – 26 July 1979	Succeeded by Joachim Goldbach
