= Bogucki =

Bogucki (feminine: Bogucka; plural: Boguccy) is a Polish-language surname. Notable people with the surname include:

Bogucka

- Anna Bogucka-Skowrońska, Polish politician and lawyer
- Hanna Bogucka (born 1965), Polish telecommunications engineer
- Maria Bogucka (1929–2020), Polish historian
- Teresa Bogucka (born 1945), Polish writer and activist

Bogucki

- Adrian Bogucki (born 1999), Polish basketball player
- Andrzej Bogucki (1904–1978), Polish stage performer
- Jacek Bogucki (born 1959), Polish politician
- Robert Bogucki (born 1966), American firefighter
