= Lachert =

Lachert is a surname. Notable people with the surname include:

- Bohdan Lachert (1900–1987), Polish architect
- Hanna Lachert (1927–2021), Polish interior architect and furniture designer
- Piotr Lachert (1938–2018), Polish composer, pianist and teacher
