= Eviva España =

- 7" vinyl single cover

Song by Samantha

from the album Eviva Samantha
- Language: Dutch
- Released: 1971
- Genre: Pasodoble
- Length: 3:33
- Label: Basart
- Composer: Leo Caerts
- Lyricist: Leo Rozenstraten

"Eviva España" (alternatively "Y Viva España" or "Que Viva España", or Short "Viva España") is a Dutch language pop song from Belgium, originally written by composer Leo Caerts and lyricist Leo Rozenstraten, first recorded and performed by the Belgian singer Samantha (born Christiane Bervoets) in 1971. Musically, the song has a distinctly Spanish-sounding pasodoble style to support the lyrics about anticipation of a holiday in Spain. Since then, it has been covered in many languages.

While Spanish-sounding, the original song title (and chorus line) alliteration "Eviva España" does not make sense in Spanish. Although "España" is the correct name of the country in Spanish, there is no such word as "Eviva" in Spanish, but there is the Italian exclamation evviva!, meaning "long live...", probably the meaning that the (non-Spanish-speaking) authors were aiming for, while dropping the double v.

After widespread success in Dutch-speaking countries, the song was covered by Imca Marina in Dutch and in early 1972 also in German, with Hanna Ahroni publishing her German version one week later. Picked up by record companies and songwriters in several other European countries, it was translated and performed by local artists for the various markets, achieving mainstream success in numerous countries between 1972 and 1977.

In 1973, an English version was recorded by Sylvia Vrethammar (as "Sylvia"). It reached No. 4 in the UK Singles Chart in September 1974, spending over six months in the charts, and was sung by Vrethammar on Top of the Pops.

The Spanish songwriters tasked with adapting the song into Spanish, had to replace the "we are travelling to Spain!" theme with something else, and naturally also found it necessary to change the "Eviva España" line. They opted to rename the song "Y Viva España", meaning "And Long Live Spain", or "Que Viva España", thereby keeping the meter of the chorus while having it make sense. The song was extremely successful both in the original 1972 version, and in later versions such as the 1973 version by Manolo Escobar.

In 1974 the long-standing Latin and dance orchestra Billo's Caracas Boys from Venezuela, with the voice of Guillermo "Memo" Morales, became one of the most known pasodobles in the whole Latin America region, especially in Venezuela. This version is so well known and played, even today (Spain included), that it was used/played by the stadium DJ in the 2010 FIFA World Cup final to celebrate the triumph of Spain that year.

The song became so ubiquitous in Latin America, and especially Spain, that it is now considered part of both cultures' musical heritage.

The creators of the English version also opted for the Spanish title, rather than the original one. It also became very successful, spending six months in the UK Singles Chart and reaching the number four spot. It sold over one million copies, and was awarded a gold disc. The song has sold 130,000 copies in Belgium. There were 56 cover versions in Germany, including one by James Last; total sales were 1.5 million copies sold. The cover version by Sylvia sold 200,000 in United Kingdom.

The Swedish version, also performed by Sylvia Vrethammar, became a Svensktoppen hit for 11 weeks between 3 June and 12 August 1973, peaking at number 1.

The song was adapted for Fulham Football Club to "Viva el Fulham", performed by Tony Rees and the Cottagers, for the club's run to the 1975 FA Cup Final. This version is still sung at club matches to this date.

In Turkey, the song has been re-written and turned into "Yaşa Fenerbahçe", the official song of the Fenerbahçe S.K. football club.

Same as above, in 1977 in Italy Luciano Brancone was composing the official song for Delfino Pescara 1936 club.

== Language versions ==
Year	Title	Language	Singer
1971	Eviva España	Dutch	Samantha
1972	Viva España	Dutch	Imca Marina
1972	Viva España	French	Georgette Plana
1972	Eviva España	German	Hanna Ahroni
1972	Eviva España	German	Heino
1972	Εβίβα Ελλάδα (Eviva Ellada)	Greek	Gino Cudsi
1972	Eviva España	Norwegian	Gro Anita Schønn
1973	Eviva Espana	Arabic	Melhem Barakat
1973	Eviva España	Danish	Elisabeth Edberg
1973	Eviva Espanja	Finnish	Marion Rung
1973	Y viva España	Spanish	Manolo Escobar
1973	Y viva España	Spanish	Los Zafiros
1973	Y Viva España	English/Swedish	Sylvia Vrethammar
1974	Yaşa Fenerbahçe	Turkish	Nesrin Sipahi
1974	Y Viva España	Spanish	Billo's Caracas Boys Orchestra
1974	Šampanja	Estonian	Laine
1975	Viva el Fulham	English	Tony Rees and the Cottagers
1975	Viva Espana (Forever A Song in My Heart)	English	Pat Boone
1977	Evviva Pescara	Italian	Luciano Brancone Orchestra Les Sauvages
1980	Vždyť já už jsem vdaná ("I'm already married")	Czech	Ladislava Kozderková
1992	Eviva Espana	Hungarian	Kovács Kati
2009	Eviva Espana	German	Peter Wackel
2013	Viva Lasagne	English	Michael Lejour

== See also ==
- List of best-selling Latin singles
