= Waldemar Jagodziński =

Polish chess player (1934–2021)

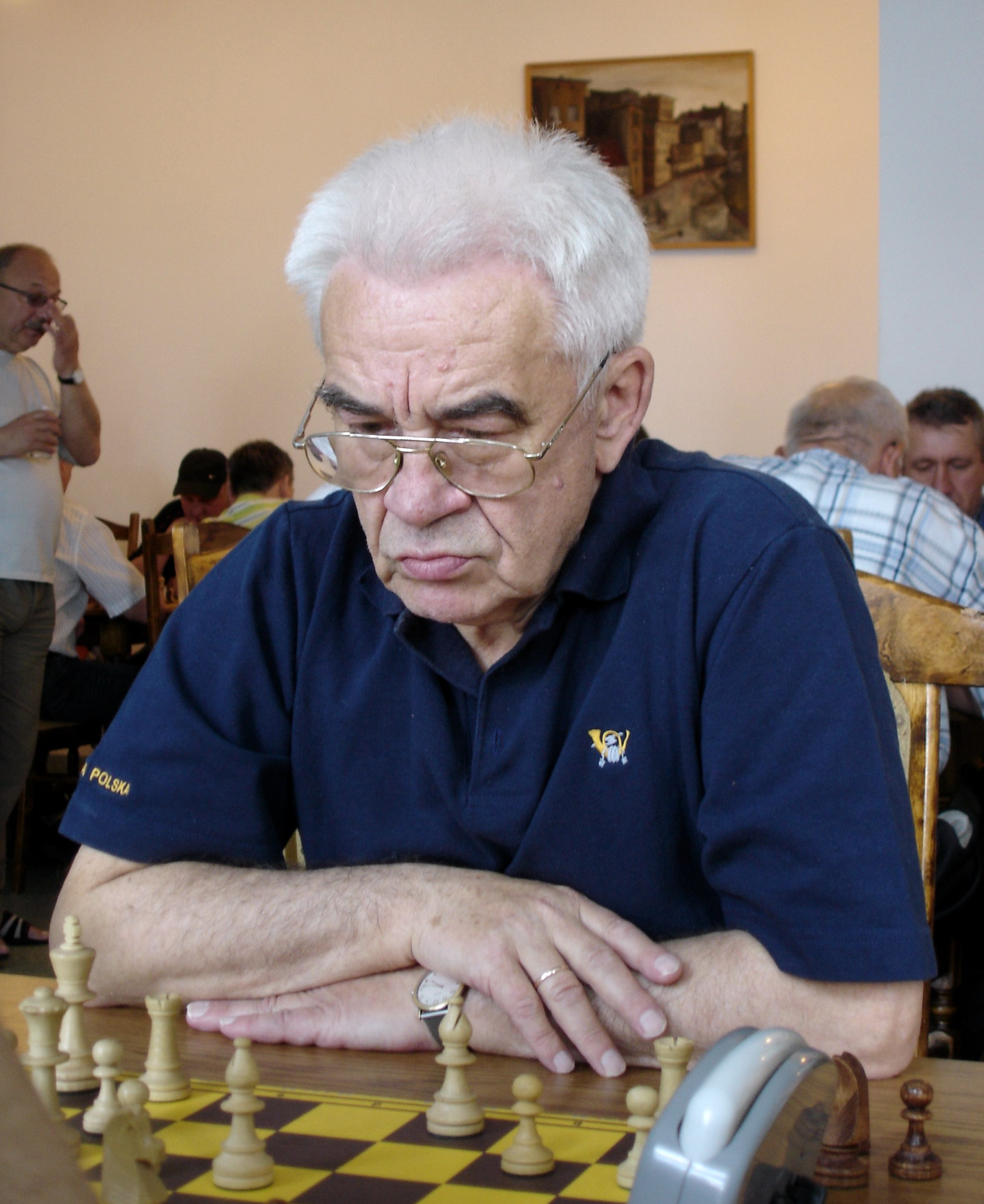
- Waldemar Jagodziński in 2010

Personal information
- Born: 13 January 1934 Bydgoszcz, Poland
- Died: 3 February 2021 (aged 87) Bydgoszcz, Poland

Chess career
- Country: Poland
- Peak rating: 2255 (January 1989)

Waldemar Jagodziński (13 January 1934 – 3 February 2021) was a Polish chess player and trainer.

== Chess career ==
At the turn of 1965 and 1966, Waldemar Jagodziński took part in the cyclical Round-robin tournament in Reggio Emilia. He took a distant place, but he was the only one who beat the winner, Yugoslavian Grandmaster, Bruno Parma. Waldemar Jagodziński achieved his greatest chess successes in the 1970s. Twice in row (1973 and 1974, both in Łódź) he won the silver medals in Polish Blitz Chess Championship. Waldemar Jagodziński was also a three-time medalist of Polish Team Chess Championship: in 1952 (with the ches club ZS Spójnia Bydgoszcz) and 1974 - bronze, and in 1978 - gold (with the ches club KS Łączność Bydgoszcz). In Polish Chess Championship he appeared only once in his career in 1976 in Bydgoszcz, but in the Swiss-system tournament he took a distant place.

Waldemar Jagodziński raised several generations of chess players. Among his pupils, the most successful was one of his daughters, Joanna, who is Women International Master (WIM) four-time medalist of the Polish Women's Chess Championship and bronze medalist of the World Girls U-20 Championship (1983). His other daughter, Hanna Zboroń, also has chess career but chose a career as a scientist in Poznań University of Economics and Business.

Waldemar Jagodziński is buried in the Catholic Cemetery of St. Vincent de Paul in Bydgoszcz.
