= Joanna Sadkiewicz =

Polish chess player (born 1966)

Personal information
- Born: 1 January 1966 (age 60) Bydgoszcz, Poland

Chess career
- Country: Poland (until 1992); Germany (since 1992)
- Title: Woman International Master (1986)
- Peak rating: 2225 (July 1991)

Joanna Sadkiewicz (née Jagodzińska; born 1 January 1966) is a Polish and German (from 1992) chess Woman International Master (WIM) (1986).

== Biography ==
Joanna Sadkiewicz achieved her first chess success in 1977, winning the International Youth Chess Tournament in Chełmno. Over the next years, she belonged to the group of the best juniors, and then to the top Polish chess players. In 1982, in Częstochowa, she won the Polish Youth Chess Championship in the U17 girl's age group. A year later, at the World Youth Chess Championship in U20 girl's age group in Mexico, she ranked 3rd and won the bronze medal. Also in 1983, she won the International Chess Tournament in Piotrków Trybunalski and for the first time played in the final of Polish Women's Chess Championship, played in Tarnów. In 1984 (in Katowice) and 1985 (in Dobrna in Yugoslavia) she represented Poland at the European Junior Chess Championships and ranked 5th in both tournaments. From 1983 to 1994 Joanna Sadkiewicz eleven times participated in Polish Women's Chess Championship finals, winning two silver (Sandomierz 1985, Lubniewice 1991) and two bronze (Konin 1984, Świeradów-Zdrój 1992) medals. In 1991 Joanna Sadkiewicz won silver medal in the Polish Blitz Chess Championship.

Since 1992, Joanna Sadkiewicz has lived permanently in Germany and represents this country in international ches tournaments. In 1993, she appeared in the final of the German Women's Chess Championship. A year later, Joanna Sadkiewicz ended her active chess career. In the following years, she occasionally played in team matches of German Chess Bundesliga. In 2002, she appeared in Poland again, representing the team Baszty (Żnin) in the Polish Team Chess Championship Second League in Wisła.

Joanna Sadkiewicz achieved the highest rating in her career so far on July 1, 1991, with a score of 2225 points, she was ranked 5th place among Polish female chess players.

== Private life ==
She is daughter of Polish chess master Waldemar Jagodziński and youngest sister of Polish chess master Hanna Zboroń.
