= Christiane Bervoets =

Belgian singer (1948–2023)

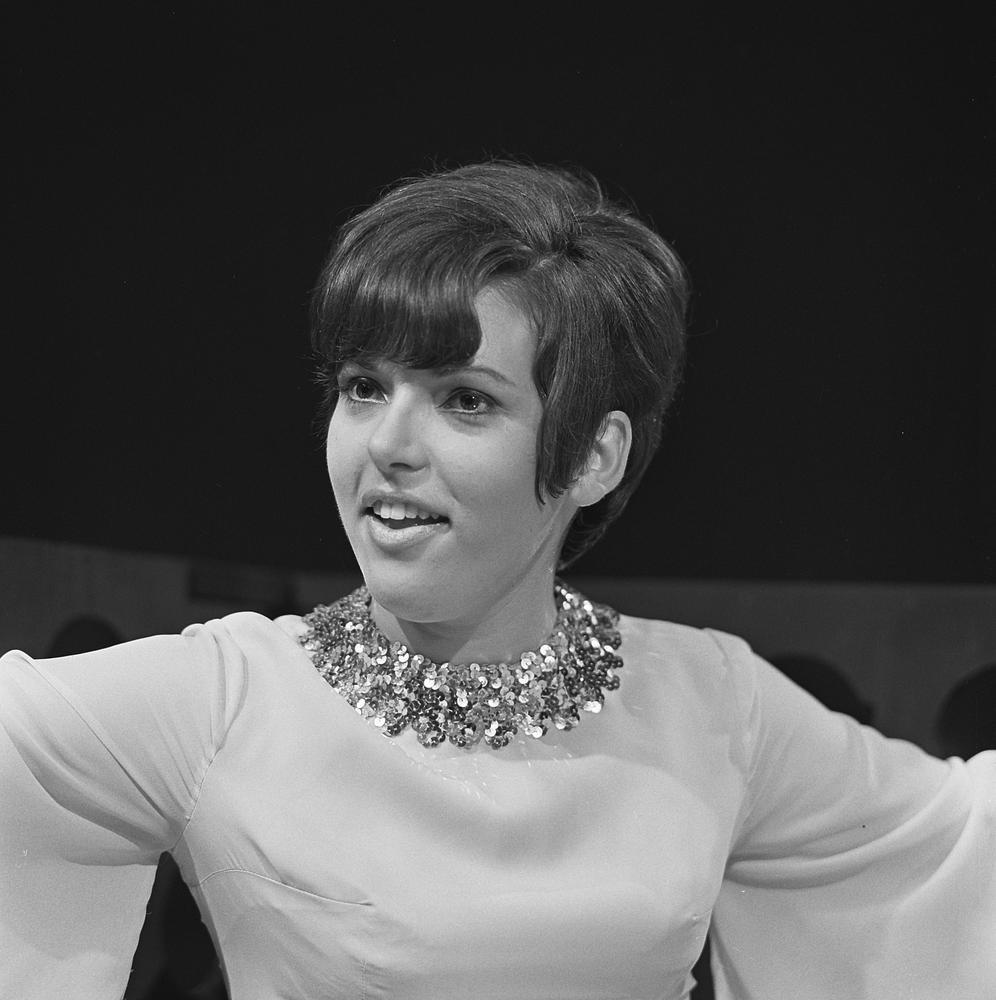

Background information
- Also known as: Samantha
- Born: 10 May 1948
- Died: 17 November 2023 (aged 75)
- Instrument: vocals
- Website: http://www.samantha40.be/

Christiane Bervoets (10 May 1948 – 17 November 2023), known by the stage name Samantha, was a Belgian singer.

Her 1970 recordings of "Helicopter US Navy 66" and "Nachten Van Parijs" were very successful, and her 1971 song "Eviva España", written by Leo Caerts and Leo Rozenstraten, achieved widespread fame, was inducted into the Radio Belgium Hall of Fame, and - in a cover by Manolo Escobar - became "part of Spain's cultural identity in the 1970s".

In 2016, Bervoets received the Golden Lifetime Award at the Retro Festival Aarschot. As of 2017, she was living in a residential care center in Belgium.

Bervoets died on 17 November 2023, at the age of 75.
