= Hanna Sahlfeld-Singer =

Swiss politician (1943–2025)

- Sahlfeld-Singer in 1971

Member of the National Council
- In office 1971–1975
- Constituency: St Gallen

Personal details
- Born: 17 October 1943 Flawil, Switzerland
- Died: 11 October 2025 (aged 81)
- Party: Social Democratic Party
- Spouse: Rolf Sahlfeld (m. 1968)

Hanna Sahlfeld-Singer (née Singer; 17 October 1943 – 11 October 2025) was a Swiss politician. She was one of the first group of women elected to the National Council in 1971, serving until 1975.

== Life and career ==
Hanna Singer was born in Flawil on 17 October 1943, the daughter of Margrith (née Hohl) and Werner Singer (a master weaver). After attending primary and secondary school in Flawil, she completed her education at the cantonal school in St. Gallen. She subsequently studied Protestant theology. She married Rolf Sahlfeld, a pastor, in 1968, and began carrying out part-time pastoral work in Altstätten. The following year she was ordained.

After women were granted the right to vote in federal elections, Sahlfeld-Singer was nominated as a candidate of the Social Democratic Party (SP) in St Gallen for the 1971 federal elections. She was elected to the National Council, becoming the youngest of the group of twelve women elected. In order to take her seat, she had to give up her pastoral work due to a constitutional ban on clergy being MPs. The following year she gave birth, becoming the first sitting Swiss MP to do so.

Although she was re-elected in 1975, she gave up her seat as she and her husband moved to Wil. Later in 1975 the couple moved to West Germany, where Sahlfeld-Singer worked as a school pastor at a school in Wipperfürth from 1976 to 2003. After retiring, she moved to Barsinghausen.

Sahlfeld-Singer died on 11 October 2025, at the age of 81.
