= Hanna Lehtinen =

Finnish diplomat

Hanna Katariina Lehtinen (born 9 May 1958) is a Finnish diplomat.

She was born in Helsinki and has served as the Finnish Ambassador to Warsaw since September 2014. She moved to the post of deputy head of department at the Department of Foreign Affairs of the Ministry of Foreign Affairs. Lehtinen has also worked at the Department for Foreign Affairs of America and Asia, the Department of Commerce and Politics, and the Finnish Delegations in Brussels and Geneva.

She has also worked for the EU Commission in the External Relations Directorate. In the Ministry for Foreign Affairs, Lehtinen came in 1983.

In 2016, the Finnish Defense Forces granted Lehtinen a special military award for her work for the Defense Forces.
