= Hanna Leybrand =

German woman writer

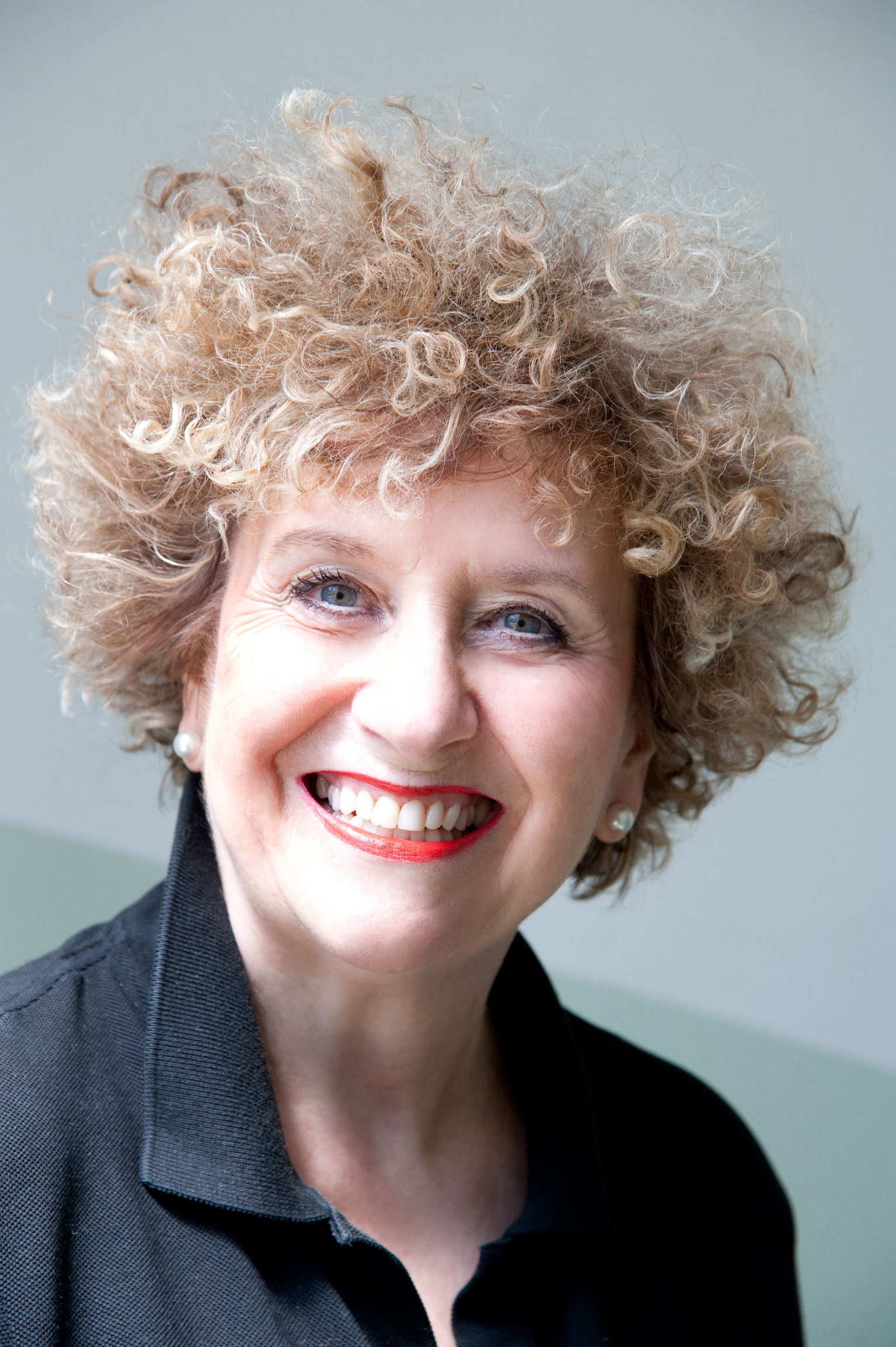
Hanna Leybrand (2014)

Hanna Leybrand (15 July 1945 – 25 May 2017) was a German writer, recitator and operatic soubrette.

== Life ==
Born in Passau, Leybrand studied Romance languages, Latin studies and philosophy at the University of Heidelberg after attending the humanist Gymnasium Leopoldinum in her hometown. In Heidelberg and Mannheim, she trained in singing. After numerous publications in daily newspapers, magazines and anthologies, her first volume of poetry was published by Manutius Verlag Heidelberg in 2003. Leybrand was curator for literature at the Rhein-Neckarkkreis Cultural Foundation.

Leybrand died in Heidelberg at 71.

== Work ==
Leybrand's poems live from the musicality of their language and the variation of speech forms and punchlines. Already the genre specification of the first volume "Gedichte nicht nur von der Liebe" (Poems not only about love) gives a working motto of her further literary work. Through intertextual allusions and reminiscences, also parodies and contrafactums, multi-layered levels of meaning emerge. In addition to some German-language female poets (such as Ingeborg Bachmann), Leybrand was moved and partly also influenced by great poets of the Romania (including Rafael Alberti). While the early stories present pointed literary miniatures, but also already more expansive narrative texts, the more recent work Sebastian from the book The Nest or the erotic double novel Tiger Kisses, for example, tend towards the complex narrative large-scale form. Characteristic of Leybrand are precise descriptions of landscapes, penetrating observations of everyday life, her tragic-comic, sometimes bizarre characters, not least her leading questions about the reasons and abysses of happiness.

== Books ==
Published by Manutius Verlag:

- Schafft die Träume ab. Gedichte nicht nur von der Liebe, Heidelberg 2003
- Der Chaosforscher. Geschichten & Kurzprosa, Heidelberg 2005
- Der Schwarzwaldschamane. Geschichten & Kurzprosa, Heidelberg 2006
- Tage in Weiß und Blau. Gedichte, Heidelberg 2007
- Das Nest. Neue Prosa – Neue Lyrik, Heidelberg 2011
- Tigerküsse. Zwei kleine Romane, Heidelberg 2014
- Wilhelm Kühlmann: Fäden im Labyrinth. Literarische Streifzüge 1984–2004, edited by Jost Eickmeyer and Hanna Leybrand, Heidelberg 2009

== Awards ==
- 1995, Prize of the International Poetry Competition (Diploma di merito speciale) in Benevent/Italy
- 2001, second place at the Mannheimer Heinrich-Vetter-Literaturpreis for poetry
