= Hanna Weil =

German-born British artist (1921-2011)

- Born: 1921; Munich, Germany
- Died: 2011 (aged 89–90)
- Education: Saint Martins School of Art
- Known for: Painting

Hanna Weil (1921–2011) was a German-born British artist, notable as a painter and teacher.

== Biography ==
Weil was born in Munich in 1921 and, after her family, who were Jewish, moved to England in 1932 to escape the establishment of Nazi Germany, she attended the North London Collegiate School. From 1940 to 1943 Weil studied at Saint Martins School of Art in central London and then taught at the Hammersmith School of Art from 1945 to 1948. While working at Hammersmith, Weil also began teaching at Saint Martin's and continued in that role until 1987. While teaching Weil continued to paint, often creating landscapes and cityscapes with a somewhat distorted perspective. She exhibited paintings at the Royal Academy in London and with commercial galleries, notably the Leicester Galleries and the Trafford Gallery. Between 1962 and 1964 Weil created a number of posters for London Transport, including designs promoting Hampton Court Palace and the Festival of the City of London. Both the London Transport Museum and the Victoria and Albert Museum hold examples of these designs.

Weil married the engineer and metallurgist Rudolf Strauss (1913-2001) and the couple lived at Hampstead in north London.
