= Hanna T. Rose =

American curator (1909–1976)

Hanna Toby Rose (12 April 1909 – 14 December 1976) was an American curator.

== Biography ==
Rose was born in New York City in 1909. She was educated at Wellesley College.

Rose began her career at the Brooklyn Museum in 1931 as a docent and was appointed Supervisor of Education in 1943, a role she held until her retirement in 1972. Prior to her retirement, she was also the vice-director for education at the museum. She was the first recipient of the Katherine Coffey Award in 1972.

Rose played a prominent role in various national and international museum education organizations and was the president of the International Committee on Education in Museums from 1953 to 1962. She advocated for the distinct educational role of museums, differentiating them from schools and libraries, as reflected in her acceptance speech for the Katherine Coffey Award.

Rose's initiatives aimed to integrate museums into the broader educational context, a concept that is now widely accepted. Her reforms included the "Mobile Classroom" program, which transformed museum galleries into interactive learning environments, which the museum cited for upon her retirement. She also facilitated the loan of multimedia educational materials to schools and initiated a television series and music concerts linked to museum exhibits, enhancing public access to museum resources.

In a 1955 report, Rose outlined the goals of museum education, emphasizing the importance of supporting classroom learning, fostering an appreciation for historical connections, and promoting regular museum visits, particularly among younger demographics. She challenged the perception of museums as insular entities and highlighted their potential role in lifelong learning.

Rose died on December 14, 1976.
