= Hanna Dimishky =

Syrian Christian missionary and educator

Hanna Dimishky (July 19, 1847 – December 5, 1912) was a Syrian Christian missionary and educator. He was a schoolmaster in the Middle East. He is identified as an "Arab Pioneer" of the Anglican church in the Middle East. He began his work for the Church Mission Society (CMS) in Jerusalem. Dimishky also worked to shape the educational systems and foster religious independence within the region.

== Early life ==
Hanna Dimishky was born on July 19, 1894, in Lydd, now Lod, in Israel. His roots trace back to a Greek Catholic heritage originating from Syria. His father, Joseph Antoine Safi, had initially arrived in Nazareth around 1830, but following his marriage, he relocated to Lydd. Dimishky was one of eleven children.

Dimishky devoted a substantial part of his life to the Bishop Gobat School, established in 1847, which has since evolved into the Jerusalem University College location on Mount Zion. (Note: In 1853 the school moved into a new building on Mount Zion, which is used by the Jerusalem University College since 1967.) The school also served as an orphanage, where Dimishky learned English. His father placed him at Bishop's School because he wanted him to serve in his own nation, the Arabs.

== Career ==
Dimishky expressed gratitude to his father who had made a promise to Bishop Gobat and had solemnly vowed it before God. In Hanna's words, "Thanks be to the most merciful Father who has heard and accepted my father's humble voice. It is now the 16th year that I am working at Lydda as a schoolmaster.".

Dimishky devoted the majority of his time to Lydd, where he worked as a teacher for 19 years. He was ordained a deacon on Trinity Sunday, June 16, 1889, by George Blyth, the 4th Bishop of the Anglican Diocese of Jerusalem. Although Lydd was his primary focus, Hanna also spent time in Jaffa and Kerak.

In 1897, owing to the death of his wife, the work at Lydd was affected, so the women of Ramla assumed responsibility for the ongoing work at Lydd. During this year, Dimishky wrote reflection on the impact of his wife's legacy. He expressed gratitude for her dedication and wrote that her salary allowed their son to pursue training as a medical missionary. This support facilitated their son's journey to Beirut, where he began medical missionary training.

In 1903, J. R. Longley Hall observed the progress of Dimishky's work in Kerak and noted its satisfactory development. Each evening, Dimishky conducted a Bible class that attracted over fifty men and boys. Hall said that the remarkable aspect wasn't just the attendance numbers but the impressive responses from certain men during discussions on the Bible and Christian doctrine, indicating their consistent participation in the classes.

For his educational and religious work, Dimishky was identified as an "Arab Pioneer" of the Anglican Church in the Middle East.
