= Jaszkowa Dolna =

- Village
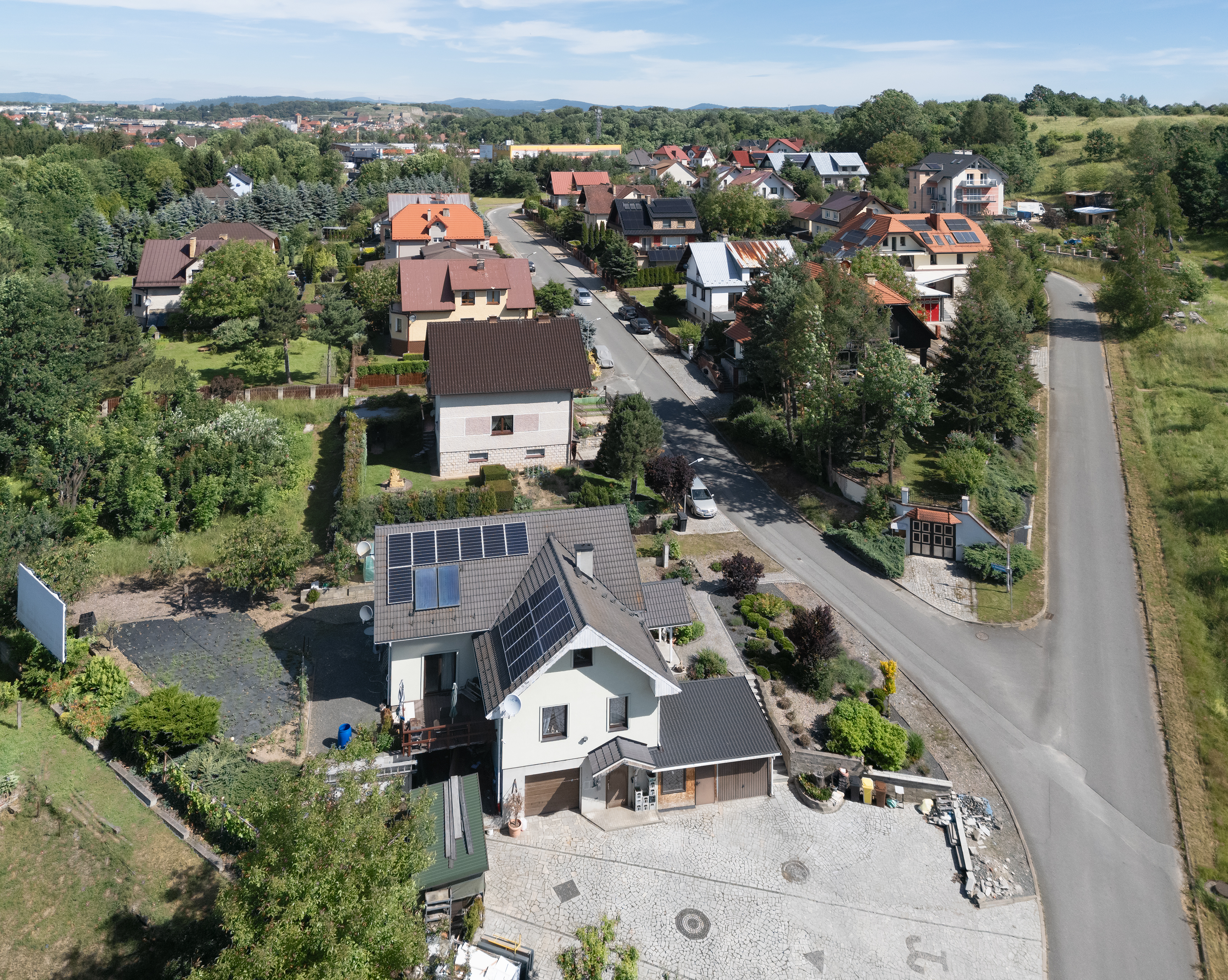

- Location within Poland
- Coordinates: 50°26′N 16°41′E
- Country: Poland
- Voivodeship: Lower Silesian
- County: Kłodzko
- Gmina: Kłodzko
- Highest elevation: 350 m (1,150 ft)
- Population: 1,400

Jaszkowa Dolna [jaʂˈkɔva ˈdɔlna] is a village in the administrative district of Gmina Kłodzko, within Kłodzko County, Lower Silesian Voivodeship, in south-western Poland.
