= Hanna Schmitz =

Swedish actress

Hanna Kristina Schmitz (née Sjögren-Devrient; born 7 August 1976) is a Swedish actress. She has worked at theatres such as Malmö City Theatre in Malmö, Spegelteatern, Strindberg's Intimate Theater and the experimental dance theatre Weld.
