= Hanna Varis =

Finnish artist (born 1959)

Hanna Leena Kristiina Varis (b. 1959 in Kuusankoski) is a Finnish graphic artist and painter. She earned a Master of Arts degree from the Aalto University School of Arts, Design and Architecture in 1990. She participated in the NUROPE, Nomadic University for Art, Philosophy and Enterprise in Europe, in 2006–2010. She has held over 70 solo exhibitions and participated at over 140 group exhibitions. Her works are part of major art collections in Finland and abroad, such as the Kiasma, Amos Anderson Art Museum, and Helsinki Art Museum in Helsinki, Wäinö Aaltonen Museum of Art in Turku, and Albertina Museum in Vienna.
