= Hanna Rambe =

Indonesian writer

- Born: 23 November 1940 (age 85); Jakarta, Indonesia
- Occupations: Writer, journalist
- Writing career
- Language: Indonesian
- Genres: Novel, biography
- Notable works: Mirah dari Banda (2003), Pertarungan (2002)

Hanna Rambe is an Indonesian writer and journalist (born 23 November 1940 in Jakarta).

== Biography ==
She was educated largely in Jakarta. In the mid-1960s, she entered the Literature Department at the University of Indonesia where she enrolled in the English language division, but she did not complete her schooling. She began working as a journalist, beginning as a copy-editor at the Indonesian Observer newspaper, and then worked as a translator and reporter for Indonesia Raya until 1974. She also worked as a contributor to the magazine Intisari (1972–1977), and then as a journalist at Mutiara magazine from (1977–1992).

According to Jane Miller, Rambe's stories are infused with a strong sense of irony—in "The Love of City People," a country girl is confused when she meets her city relatives and finds out that they care more about their pets than each other.

Rambe's work as a journalist provided her the opportunity to travel and her journeys provided inspiration for her stories. She is also known as an author who researches her subject in detail prior to writing; when preparing Mirah dari Banda she lived for a month in Banda doing research; while writing Seorang Lelaki dari Waimital, Rambe went back and forth to Seram, to the difficult to reach interior of the island.

According to Korrie Layun Rampan, Hanna Rambe is a mystery novelist who explores history and connects with the issue of fate as exemplified in Mirah dari Banda.

Not all of her works are works of fiction. Her profession as a journalist influenced the form of her writing. Among her other works are biographies: Terhempas Prahara ke Pasifik, Mencari Makna Hidupku (a biography of Ibu Suyatin Kartowijono, a pioneer in the struggle for women’s rights from the 1920s), and Pelayaran Cadik Nusantara (a youth who took a fishing boat alone all the way to Brunei). Today, Hanna Rambe has retired from journalism and spends her days writing as well as teaching English. She is currently working on a three-volume history of Eastern Indonesia in the seventeenth century.

== Selected works ==
- Boender, R. Soedirmo; Rambe, Hanna (1982). Terhempas prahara ke Pasifik: kenangan seorang prajurit bekas anggota The Rainbow Division, sebuah divisi yang terkenal selama Perang Pasifik (in Indonesian). Jakarta: Penerbit Sinar Harapan.
- Rambe, Hanna (1983). Mencari makna hidupku: bunga rampai perjalanan Sujatin Kartowijono [Sujatin Kartowijono's Searching the Meaning of My Life] (in Indonesian). Jakarta: Penerbit Sinar Harapan.
- Rambe, Hanna (1983). Seorang Lelaki Di Waimital : Sebuah Pernyataan Dan Bandingan Terhadap Beribu Slogan Pembangunan (in Indonesian). Jakarta: Penerbit Sinar Harapan. ISBN 978-979-9375-48-3.
- Rambe, Hanna (1992). Petualangan Effendy Soleman dengan Cadik Nusantara (in Indonesian). Jakarta: Pustaka Sinar Harapan.
- Rambe, Hanna (1999). Dua permata nusantara (in Indonesian). Jakarta: Persetia.
- Rambe, Hanna (2002). Pertarungan : sebuah novel ekologi (in Indonesian). Magelang: IndonesiaTera. ISBN 978-979-9375-45-2.
- Rambe, Hanna (2003). Mirah dari Banda : sebuah novel (in Indonesian). Magelang: IndonesiaTera. ISBN 978-979-9375-48-3.
- Rambe, Hanna (2010). Mirah of Banda. Jakarta, Indonesia: Lontar. ISBN 978-979-8083-78-5.
