= Hanna Frosterus-Segerstråle =

Finnish artist and writer (1867–1946)

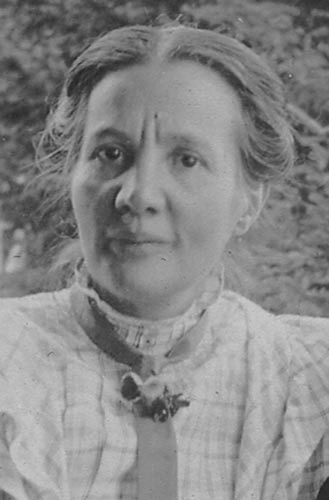
Hanna Frosterus-Segerstråle

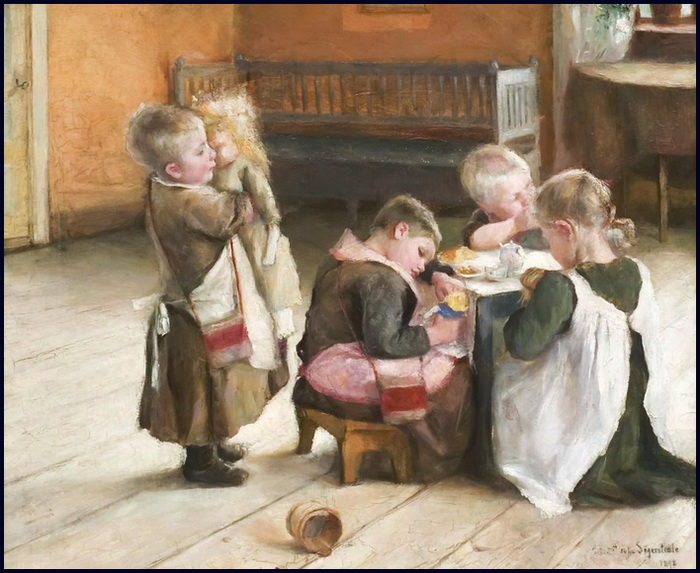
Lekande barn ("Playing children")

Hanna Frosterus-Segerstråle (23 October 1867 in Helsinki – 9 April 1946 in Porvoo) was a Finnish artist and writer. She is best known for paintings portraying intimate family life, and for portraits.

== Life ==
Hanna Frosterus-Segerstråle was born Johanna Wilhelmina Frosterus in a Swedish-speaking Finnish family. Her brother was geologist Benjamin Frosterus.

She started studying art for Maria Wiik and at art school in Helsinki 1883–1887. She then continued her studies in Paris, in 1888 at Académie Colarossi under the tutelage of Gustave Courtois, Raphaël Collin and Pierre Puvis de Chavannes. After having returned to Finland and there married her husband, future teacher of theology Albert Segerstråle, the couple again went to Paris in 1889. She continued her art studies at Académie Julian and elsewhere.

The couple thereafter returned to Finland and Hanna Frosterus-Segerstråle would spend most of the rest of her life in Porvoo and in the family summer house in a village in Pernå. Although she had the main responsibility for the couple's eight children, she kept painting all her life. Her husband and mother supported her ambitions. Nonetheless, being a house wife meant that she was cut off from much of the artistic social life of Finland at the time. Her art was however very well received by critics. Her artwork was exhibited for the first time in 1886, and in 1887 one of her paintings received the third prize at a prestigious art exhibition in Helsinki. The following two years paintings by her hand both times received first prize at the same annual exhibition. She contributed with a painting to the Paris Salon in 1888 and at the Exposition Universelle in 1900. After this she made few appearances in the art community. Later exhibitions of her work were made in 1922, 1930, 1937 and retrospectively in 1947.

Hanna Frosterus-Segerstråle was a markedly religious person, something which may have influenced her art. She was active in Christian charities and worked actively for the amelioration of women's situation in society. She was particularly engaged in the question of how to allow for women to combine work and family life in a better way.

== Artwork ==
The corpus of work of Hanna Frosterus-Segerstråle can roughly be divided into three time periods. In the earlier part of her career she painted intimate scenes of family life and notably her own inner circle of family and friends; these works have been compared to those of Carl Larsson. Gradually but approximately after 1892, she began to focus more on portraits. After c. 1920, the main focus of her art work was religious motifs. Throughout her life she worked mainly in pastel but occasionally also with other methods. Her paintings Méditation (1888) and En liten patient ("A little patient") (1889) have been described as some of her best work.

== Literature ==
Hanna Frosterus-Segerstråle was also active her entire life as a writer, mainly of children's books. She published under the pseudonyms "H.F." or "-anna".

- I qvällsstunden. Sagor och berättelser (1885)
- Klöfverbladet på Gammelgård. Berättelser för barn. Stockholm (1897)
- Hemvärld och skollif. Stockholm (1902)
- Stugornas vän. Berättelser I. Stockholm (1902)
- Stugornas vän. Berättelser II. Stockholm (1905)
- Kärlekens väg. Berättelser. Stockholm (1907)
- Stugornas vän. Berättelser för barn III-V. Stockholm (1907)
- Annis barn. Berättelser för gossar och flickor. Stockholm (1932)
- Söndagens berättelser (1935)
