= Hanna Dodiuk-Kenig =

Israeli scientist, professor and inventor

- חנה דודיוק-קניג
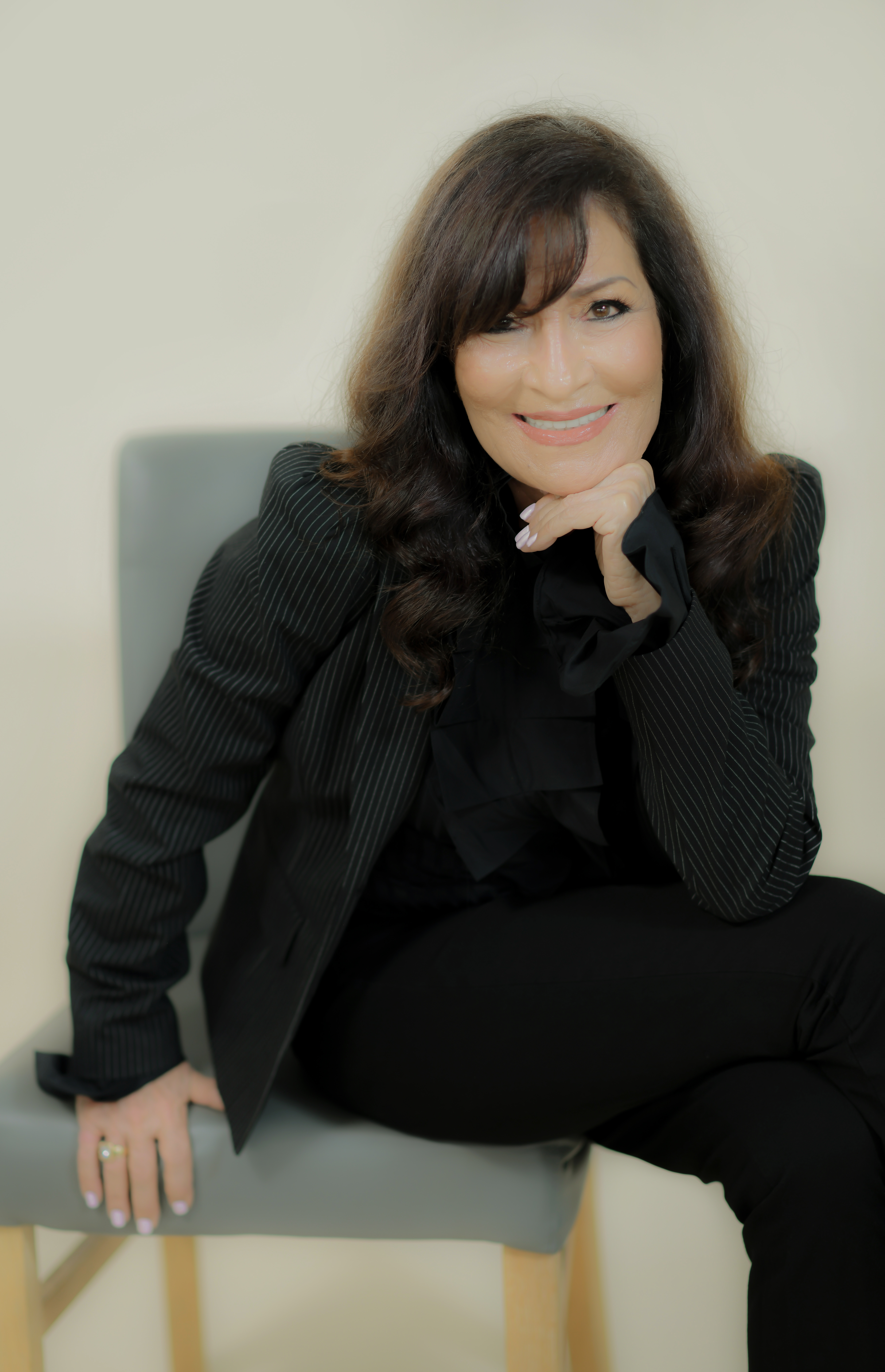
- Born: June 20, 1948 (age 78); Kraków, Poland
- Scientific career
- Fields: Plastics, polymers, nano-technology
- Workplaces: Tel Aviv University, Rafael Advanced Defense Systems, Shenkar College of Engineering, Design and Art

Hanna Dodiuk-Kening (Hebrew: חנה דודיוק-קניג; born June 20, 1948) is an Israeli chemist and an inventor. Her fields of expertise are adhesive technology, polymers and development of nano-technology.

== Biography ==
Dodiuk was born in 1948 in Kraków, Poland. Her parents were holocaust survivors, rescued from the Auschwitz concentration camp as they were part of the schindlerjuden.

She received her B.Sc degree in the field of chemistry in 1970 from Tel Aviv University, and finished her M.Sc with honors in 1973. After completing her PHD under the supervision of Edward Kosower, she became a member of the chemistry faculty in Tel Aviv University and a lecturer for 2 years.

Dodiuk began working in 1979 at Rafael Advanced Defense Systems, where she worked for 18 years. She began her career there as an adhesion engineer and held various R&D positions. In 1991 she was appointed director of the Materials and Processes Department. - making her the first female senior manager at Rafael.

After her retirement from Rafael, Dodiuk held the position of the President of the Israeli Polymer & Plastics Society (IPPS) for 2 years, and was the first elected woman of the organization. In 2013 she became the first woman to become an honorary fellow from the IPPS.

Dodiuk began her academic career at the Technion. In 1996 on joined Shenkar College and in 2000 became a full professor at the institute.

She was appointed head of the Department of Plastic Engineering at Shenkar in 2006, and since 2020 she has been acting as the head of Polymer Materials Engineering M.Sc Program.

In addition, she has held a number of short-term roles: as a visiting scientist for The Bayer Company; and as a visiting professor at the New Jersey Institute of Technology and at the University of Massachusetts Lowell.

In 2017, Dodiuk became a member of the Council for Higher Education in Israel.

== Books and articles ==
Dodiuk has contributed to the publications of several books in the fields of plastics and polymers, and was the editor of two books: Handbook of Thermoset Plastics and Recent Advances in Adhesion Science and Technology.

In addition, she is the author and the co-author for more than 200 scientific publications. She is also a member of Polymers, the international open-access journal of polymer science published by MDPI

== Patents ==
Dodiuk is responsible for the development and registration of over 20 patents. Some of her notable patents:

- A dental material using nanofiber reinforcement to create minimal sacrifice and bleeding, (application).
- A new non-adhesive coating that can repel water and ice. The patent was presented at the exhibition "Israeli Discoveries and Developments that Influenced the World" held at Ben Gurion Airport.
