= Hanna Zboroń =

Polish chess player (born 1956)

Personal information
- Born: 16 December 1956 (age 69) Bydgoszcz, Poland

Chess career
- Country: Poland
- Peak rating: 2120 (January 1990)

Hanna Zboroń (née Jagodzińska, born 16 December 1956) is a Polish chess player.

== Chess career ==
From the beginning of the 1970s to the end of the 1980s, Hanna Zboroń was among the best Polish female chess players. Hanna Zboroń six times participated in Polish Youth Chess Championships (1968–1974) and the best result was achieved in 1971, when she took 6th place in U20 girls age group. In Polish Women's Chess Championship finals she played ten times (1976–1988) and reached 6th place in 1979. With chess club KS Łączność Bydgoszcz Hanna Zboroń won 2 medals in Polish Team Chess Championships: gold (1978) and bronze (1974). In 1978 she won Polish Women's Academic Chess Championship. In 1979, in Kalisz Hanna Zboroń achieved the other success in her career, won silver medal in Polish Women's Blitz Chess Championship. Also she won four medals in Polish Women's Team Blitz Chess Championships: 2 gold (1982, 1991), silver (1985) and bronze (1983).

Hanna Zboroń reached her career highest rating on 1 January 1994, with a score of 2120 points.

== Private life ==
Hanna Zboroń is daughter of Polish chess master Waldemar Jagodziński and eldest sister of Polish and German chess Woman International Master (WIM) Joanna Sadkiewicz. She is Doctor habilitatus and worked in Poznań University of Economics and Business as director of studies in the field of economics, member of the Program Council, member of the Rector's Committee for Social Responsibility of the university, chairwoman of the Directional Recruitment Committee for studies in the field of economics.
