= Hanna Yanushevych =

Ukrainian actress (1907–1983)

Hanna Yakivna Yanushevych (Ukrainian: Ганна Яківна Янушевич; 14 December 1907 – 25 December 1983) was a Ukrainian actress. Merited Artist of the Ukrainian SSR (1946). People's Artist of the Ukrainian SSR (1965).

== Early life and education ==
Yanushevych graduated from Kyiv M. Lysenko Music and Drama Institute in 1928.

== Career ==
Since 1927, she played on the stage at the Kyiv I. Franko Theater, then in the Kharkiv State Revolution Theater (1931–1936). In 1940, Yanushevych moved to Chernivtsi, where she worked at Chernivtsi State Ukrainian Drama Theater, formed based on Kharkiv State Revolution Theater (since 1954, Chernivtsi O. Kobylianska Ukrainian Music and Drama Theater) with her husband, actor Petro Mikhnevych. She worked in the theater until her last days.

During her years at the Chernivtsi Drama Theater, Yanushevych created over 200 highly artistic images of the Soviet and classical repertoire. Since 1954, she also starred in films.

== Awards and honors ==
- Merited Artist of the Ukrainian SSR (1946)
- Medal "For Valiant Labour in the Great Patriotic War 1941–1945" (1946)
- People's Artist of the Ukrainian SSR (1965)
- Order of the Badge of Honour (1955)
- Order of the Red Banner of Labour (1960)
- Medal "For Valiant Labour" (1970)

== Commemoration ==
The actress's name is listed in the "Alley of Stars" in Chernivtsi.

A memorial plaque was installed on the Taras Shevchenko St., 13 in Chernivtsi: "People's Artist of Ukraine Hanna Yanushevych lived in this building from 1963 to 1983."
