= Hanna Chang =

Hanna Chang may refer to:

- Han-na Chang (born 1982), South Korean conductor and cellist
- Hanna Chang (tennis) (born 1998), American tennis player
