= Hanna Klaus =

American physician and founder of TeenSTAR

Hanna Klaus (b. 1928) is an American obstetrics and gynaecology physician, a member of the Medical Mission Sisters, and best known as founder of the TeenSTAR adolescent sex education program.

Klaus was born in 1928 in Vienna, Austria, to a Jewish family, moving to the United States in 1940 and settling in Louisville, Kentucky. Klaus studied medicine at University of Louisville and then conducted her residency at Massachusetts General Hospital. In 1978 she became an associate professor of obstetrics and gynecology at George Washington University.

In 1980 Klaus founded TeenSTAR, as well as acting as the executive director of the Natural Family Planning Center in Bethesda, Maryland.

Klaus promoted the Billings ovulation method, a type of natural family planning which is approved by the Catholic Church. In 1973 she founded the Aware Center, which provided information on the Billings method. The Billings method began to gain recognition in the scientific community, and a study was carried out on its effectiveness in Kenya.

== Publications ==
- Klaus, Hanna; Cortés, Manuel E. (August 2015). "Psychological, Social, and Spiritual Effects of Contraceptive Steroid Hormones". The Linacre Quarterly. 82 (3): 283–300. doi:10.1179/2050854915Y.0000000009. PMC 4536622. PMID 26912936.
- Fehring, Richard J.; Klaus, Hanna; Williams, William V. (February 2012). "Mandates and Morals". The Linacre Quarterly. 79 (1): 9–13. doi:10.1179/002436312803571474. PMC 6027078. PMID 30082955.
- Vigil, Pilar; Orellana, Renán F.; Cortés, Manuel E.; Molina, Carmen T.; Switzer, Barbara E.; Klaus, Hanna (December 2011). "Endocrine Modulation of the Adolescent Brain: A Review". Journal of Pediatric and Adolescent Gynecology. 24 (6): 330–337. doi:10.1016/j.jpag.2011.01.061. PMID 21514192.
- Klaus, Hanna (November 1972). "Experience With Teenage Pregnancy". Bulletin of the American College of Nurse-Midwives. 17 (4): 114–121. doi:10.1111/j.1542-2011.1972.tb00562.x. PMID 4485954.
- Klaus, Hanna (August 2006). "Abstinence and Abstinence-Only Education". Journal of Adolescent Health. 39 (2): 151, discussion 152, author reply 152–4. doi:10.1016/j.jadohealth.2006.02.002. PMID 16857521.
- Vigil, Pilar; Ceric, Francisco; Cortés, Manuel E.; Klaus, Hanna (June 2006). "Usefulness of Monitoring Fertility from Menarche". Journal of Pediatric and Adolescent Gynecology. 19 (3): 173–179. doi:10.1016/j.jpag.2006.02.003. PMID 16731410.
- Klaus, Hanna (January 2002). "Family planning in Bangladesh". The Lancet. 359 (9303): 359. doi:10.1016/S0140-6736(02)07522-0. PMID 11830240. S2CID 37470653.
- Bowes, Watson; Byrne, Paul; Cavanagh, Denis; Colliton, William; Foye, Gerard; Klaus, Hanna; Pellegrino, Edmund (August 1997). "True Integrity for the Maternal-Fetal Medicine Physician". The Linacre Quarterly. 64 (3): 77–86. doi:10.1080/20508549.1999.11878387. PMID 11656746. S2CID 32155183.
- Klaus, Hanna; Weed, Stan E. (February 1996). "Impact of the teen star program on teen sexual behavior, US 1993–4". Journal of Adolescent Health. 18 (2): 133. doi:10.1016/1054-139X(96)81180-3.
- Klaus, Hanna; Kardatzke, David (January 1992). "Teen sexual involvement: Primary and secondary prevention". Journal of Adolescent Health. 13 (1): 46. doi:10.1016/1054-139X(92)90263-B.
- Labbok, Miriam H.; Stallings, Rebecca Y.; Shah, Farida; Pérez, Alfredo; Klaus, Hanna; Jacobson, Mark; Muruthi, Theresa (December 1991). "Ovulation method use during breastfeeding: Is there increased risk of unplanned pregnancy?". American Journal of Obstetrics and Gynecology. 165 (6): 2031–2036. doi:10.1016/S0002-9378(11)90574-2. PMID 1755464.
- Labbok, Miriam H.; Klaus, Hanna; Perez, Alfredo (December 1991). "Efficacy studies in natural family planning: Issues and management implications illustrated with data from five studies". American Journal of Obstetrics and Gynecology. 165 (6): 2048–2051. doi:10.1016/S0002-9378(11)90579-1. PMID 1755468.
- Klaus, Hanna; Martin, James L. (March 1989). "Recognition of ovulatory/anovulatory cycle pattern in adolescents by mucus self-detection". Journal of Adolescent Health Care. 10 (2): 93–96. doi:10.1016/0197-0070(89)90095-8. PMID 2925476.
- Klaus, Hanna; Labbok, Miriam; Barker, Dianne (September 1988). "Characteristics of Ovulation Method Acceptors: A Cross-Cultural Assessment". Studies in Family Planning. 19 (5): 299–304. doi:10.2307/1966795. JSTOR 1966795. PMID 3188135.
- Labbok, Miriam H.; Klaus, Hanna; Barker, Dianne (September 1988). "Factors Related to Ovulation Method Efficacy in Three Programs: Bangladesh, Kenya, and Korea". Studies in Family Planning. 19 (5): 310. doi:10.2307/1966799. JSTOR 1966799.
- Klaus, Hanna; Bryan, Louis Marie; Bryant, Mary Lou; Fagan, Mary Ursula; Harrigan, Marjorie B.; Kearns, Francesca (May 1987). "Initiation/continuation of sexual activity during fertility awareness education: Report of multisite pilot project". Journal of Adolescent Health Care. 8 (3): 312. doi:10.1016/0197-0070(87)90564-X.
- Klaus, Hanna; Bryan, Louis Marie; Bryant, Mary Lou; Fagan, Mary Ursula; Harrigan, Marjorie B.; Kearns, Francesca (January 1987). "Fertility Awareness/Natural Family Planning for Adolescents and Their Families: Report of Multisite Pilot Project". International Journal of Adolescent Medicine and Health. 3 (2): 101–20. doi:10.1515/IJAMH.1987.3.2.101. PMID 22912053. S2CID 201725408.
- Klaus, Hanna (9 July 2010). "The Role of the Clinician in Natural Family Planning". Journal of American College Health. 32 (3): 114–120. doi:10.1080/07448481.1983.9936154. PMID 6672043.
- Brennan, John J.; Klaus, Hanna (July 1982). "Terminology and core curricula in natural family planning*". Fertility and Sterility. 38 (1): 117–118. doi:10.1016/S0015-0282(16)46409-5. PMID 7095160.
- KLAUS, HANNA (February 1982). "Natural Family Planning". Obstetrical & Gynecological Survey. 37 (2): 128–50. doi:10.1097/00006254-198202000-00026. PMID 7033851.
- Klaus, Hanna; Goebel, Joan M.; Muraski, Beatrice; Egizio, Mary Therese; Weitzel, Davey; Taylor, Ruth S.; Fagan, Mary U.; Ek, Kay; Hobday, Kathleen (June 1979). "Use-effectiveness and client satisfaction in six centers teaching the billings ovulation method". Contraception. 19 (6): 613–629. doi:10.1016/0010-7824(79)90008-8. PMID 487811.
- Klaus, Hanna (January 1979). "Natural family planning: The contribution of fertility awareness to body-person integration". Social Thought. 5 (1): 35–42. doi:10.1080/15426432.1979.10383278.
- Klaus, H (December 1974). "The menopause in gynecology; a focus for teaching the comprehensive care of women". Academic Medicine. 49 (12): 1186–9. doi:10.1097/00001888-197412000-00013. PMID 4427344.
- Klaus, H; Meurer, J; Sullivan, A (November 1973). "Teenage pregnancy". Academic Medicine. 48 (11): 1027–9. doi:10.1097/00001888-197311000-00012.
