= John Herbst =

John Herbst may refer to:

- John E. Herbst (born 1952), American diplomat
- John C. "Pappy" Herbst (1909–1946), American flying ace

== See also ==
- Johan Herbst
