= Hanna Johannesson =

Swedish professor

Hanna Johannesson is a Swedish professor. She is the current holder of the Bergianus professorship at The Swedish Royal Academy of Sciences.

== Education ==
She did her master-education in biology at Uppsala University 1990-1995. She earned her Ph.D. in 2000 at the Swedish Agricultural University in Uppsala. She did postdoctoral work at the University of California, Berkeley. In 2013 she was named full professor at Stockholm University.

== Career ==
Johannesson is known for her work on mycology and evolutionary biology.

== Honors and awards ==
Johannesson was elected to the Royal Swedish Academy of Sciences in 2024.
