= Hanna Ahroni =

Israeli singer

Hanna Ahroni חנה אהרוני
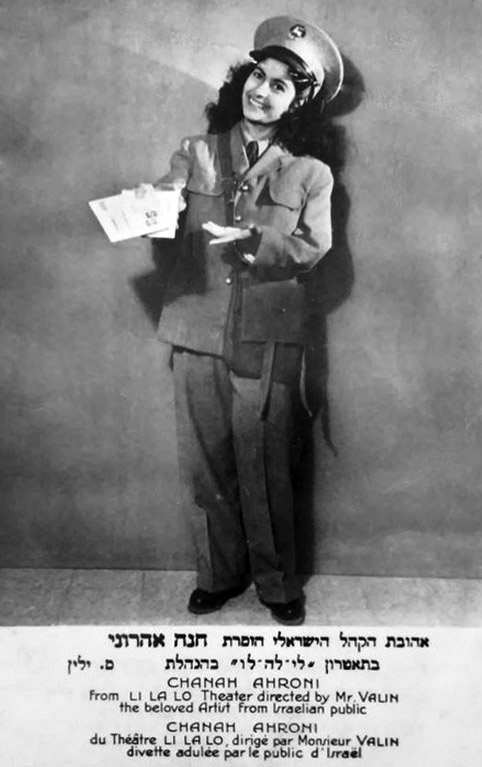

Background information
- Also known as: Hanna Aharoni, Hanna Aroni
- Born: September 10, 1933 (age 92); Asmara, Eritrea
- Genres: Israeli folk music; Latin American music
- Occupations: Singer, recording artist, concert performer
- Instrument: Vocals
- Labels: Decca; Ariola

Hanna Ahroni (Hebrew: חנה אהרוני; born September 10, 1933) is an Eritrean-born Yemeni-Israeli singer. In the late 1950s, she was nicknamed "Israel's Golden Voice". Throughout her career, she was noted for her four-octave vocal range and her ability to sing songs of various genres in several languages, including German, French, Spanish and English.

== Biography ==
Hanna Aharoni was born in 1933, in Asmara, Eritrea, the third of eight brothers and sisters. Her parents, Mansour and Mazal, were both Yemeni Jews who immigrated to Italian Eritrea. In 1934, she made aliyah with her entire family. Aharoni grew up in the Kerem HaTeimanim neighborhood of Tel Aviv, and from a young age, she helped her father, who owned a vegetable stand in the Carmel Market in Tel Aviv, encouraging shoppers to come to the stand with the help of her special voice. Her parents also raised four orphaned family members.

== Career ==
In 1943, at the age of 10, she was discovered by the composer Nahum Nardi, who taught her some of his songs, and she performed alongside him in concerts and on the radio. Her first concert took place in July 1946 And after that concert, she was asked to perform at different places. On Sukkot, October 1946, she had 5 recitals. The first performance included "Children's songs, holiday songs, shepherds' songs, folk songs, and more". The last presentation included: "Songs, hymns, holiday songs, children's songs, and more".

In 1948, after studying dance, voice development, and music, the promoter Moshe Valin offered her to join his theater, Li La Lu. There, she appeared along with the stars of the season and sang hits that were composed especially for her, by the composers Moshe Wilensky, Natan Alterman, and Yaakov Orland, like: "Zohara", "Boker Tov", and "Zechariah ben Ezra".

She completed her mandatory army service in the Ilan band, the Havi brigade of the Golani Brigade. During this period, Aharoni was recognized as a singer with a talent for singing in four octaves, and for her, the composer Daniela Dor composed the hit of those days: "Shchora Ani ve Nava", a song that made good use of her special talent. After her release from the army, she briefly joined Emmanuel Zamir's band, where she sang his songs "Bafat HaKfar" and "Arab Shach". After that, Moshe and Aline offered her a tour abroad.

In April 1956, she performed in Paris, London, and other cities in Europe. In March 1957, she sang for Elizabeth of Bavaria, the Queen of Belgium. Aharoni continued her tour in the Americas and had brief success in Mexico. In May 1958, she returned to Israel and performed in concerts and theaters. In November 1958, she returned to the USA for another tour. In January 1960, Aharoni recorded an album of Israeli folk songs, Songs of Israel (1960), for Decca Records, which sold more than half a million copies. In March 1960, she performed at New York City's The Town Hall. Later this year, she went on to perform for six weeks in Las Vegas. In early 1962 she appeared on Ed Sullivan's program.

While she was in the USA, she met the Israeli promoter Haim Tishman, married him, and moved permanently to the United States. In the 1960s and 1970s, Aharoni's career flourished, including successful appearances with Ed Sullivan and Paul Anka. Also, she directed television programs broadcast from Mexico to other Latin American countries in South America, appeared in halls and clubs, TV shows, and produced an album featuring the song Eviva España in English and Spanish, which both became hits in Europe and South America. In 1981, she won the "Best Foreign Singer of the Year" award in Brazil.

From the 1980s onwards, Aharoni decreased her activity as a singer but continued to produce records in various languages, especially Hebrew. Hannah Aharoni lives in New York, and often visits Israel.

== Tribute ==
Her career is the subject of an Israeli documentary, Viva Espania (2011).
