= Hanna Salameh =

Jordanian architect

- Education: McGill University
- Occupation: Architect
- Awards: Top 45 Most Influential Architects in the Middle East
- Practice: Hanna Salameh Design
- Website: hannasalameh.com

Hanna Salameh (Arabic: حنا سلامة) is a Jordanian architect, designer and artist. He was ranked amongst the top 45 most influential architects of the Middle East in 2018. A sustainability enthusiast and activist, he is the founder and design director at his architecture and interior design firm, Hanna Salameh Design, HSD, based in Amman, Jordan, that designs highly-efficient green projects internationally.

Salameh gained recognition in Jordan and the Middle East through project proposals presented as “vision” videos.

== Education ==
He completed both his Bachelors of Science in Architecture and Masters in Architecture degrees at McGill University in Montreal, Canada.

== Career ==
=== Architectural firm ===
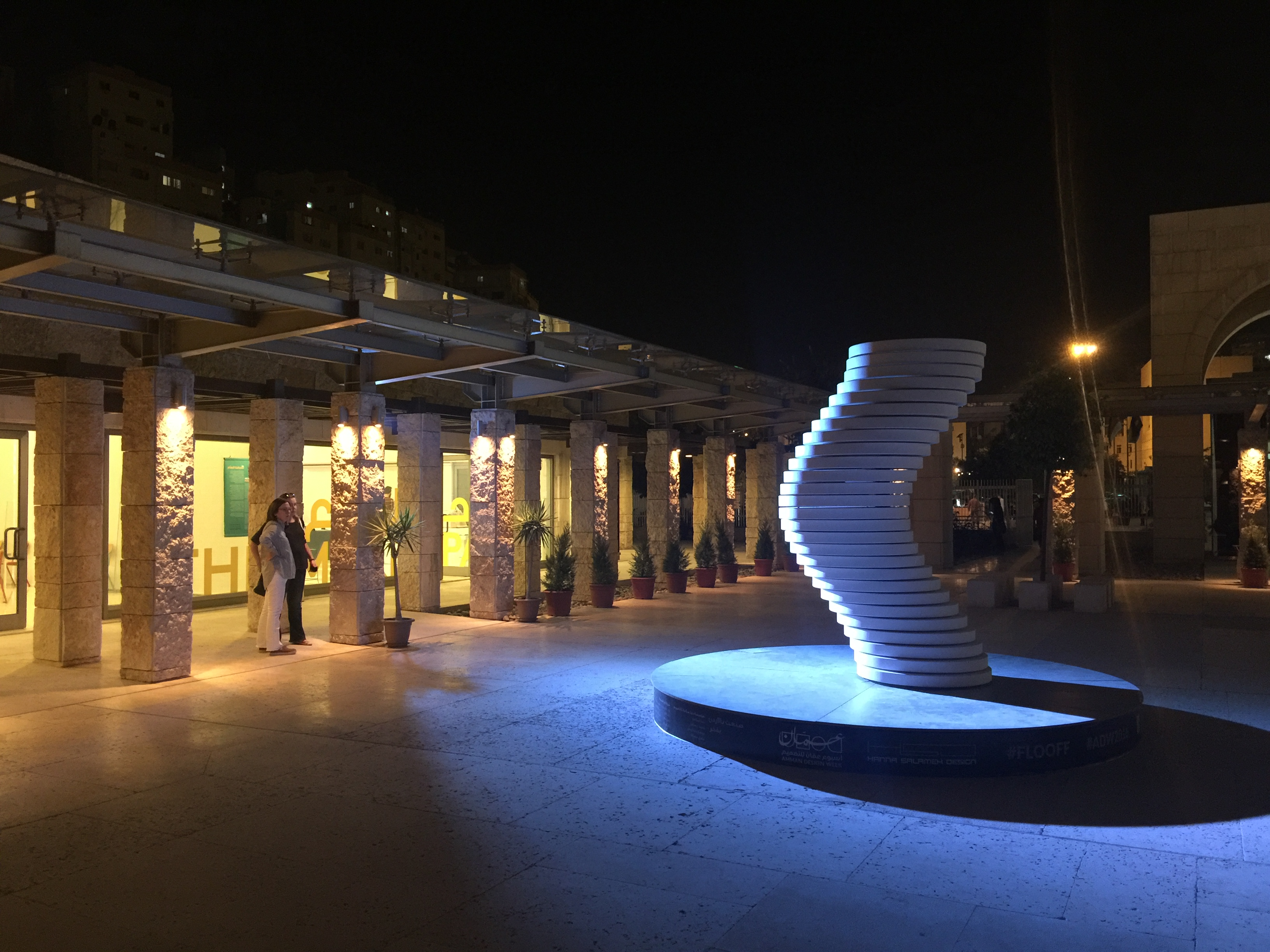
FLO OFF Interactive Sculpture by Hanna Salameh Design, photographed 2016

In 2012, Salameh founded his design and architecture firm, Hanna Salameh Design, HSD, that focuses on developing sustainable projects and conducting independent research. According to the firm's portfolio, it has done work in the fields of hospitality, healthcare, education, residential, office and retail design, in various parts of the world including the Middle East, Europe, Canada and Africa.

Salameh espoused the firm with an emphasis on developing a new perspective on modern architecture into the firm, "focusing on designs that are both relevant and specific to their culture and context". Moreover, HSD's work focuses on sustainable design, attempting to construct efficient buildings that are passively green, healthy and environmentally friendly.

=== Green awareness and teaching ===
- Outside of HSD, Salameh hosts lectures at McGill, as well as universities, schools and general public in Jordan, on sustainable design.
- Edraak Course Designer's Eye.
- Salameh also hosted May o Taqa o Frata, an online web-series produced by Aramram.com. The series shows him traveling to houses around the Kingdom of Jordan, assessing the house's performance from a sustainability perspective, and making renovations which save energy, water and money.

=== Filmmaking and theatre ===
Salameh has directed and starred in multiple productions, both onstage and on camera including "Oliver!" in Arabic, My Fair Lady and has also directed three short films titled Black Ribbon, RFR and Traffic Life.

== Visions project proposals ==
=== Jordan Gate Park ===
The first Vision by Hanna Salameh, which gained substantial media attention and was picked up by several outlets including The Guardian in 2016. Salameh proposed a different take on the Jordan Gate Towers project that had been on hold for many years. HSD's main proposal suggests using the towers for vertical farming, with several other proposals including producing clean energy via solar panels and wind turbines.

=== Diamond Jubilee Crown ===
Second Vision, HSD's concept of ‘Live Zones’ proposes an entirely new way to think of public structures. For the Diamond Jubilee Bridge in London, incorporating Live Zones provides a solution to an urgent problem, allowing the bridge to pay for itself without using any taxpayer money.

=== Hijaz Railway Park ===
Third Vision, HSD proposed to implement photovoltaic panels that would produce the energy required to run the tram, and investment in the park in way that would provide job opportunities, foster entrepreneurship and encourage public participation.
