= Arthur Kunath =

German military officer (1914–1995)

General Arthur Kunath
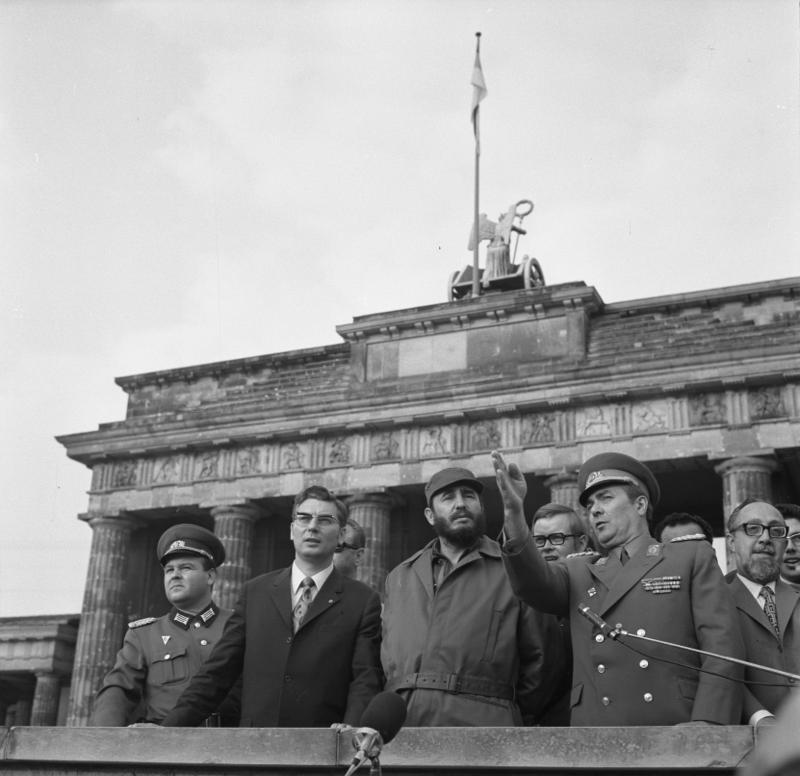
- Arthur Kunath (second from right, in uniform) explains the situation at the Berlin Wall to Fidel Castro (center) in front of the Brandenburg Gate on 14 June 1972. To Castro's left is Werner Lamberz.
- Born: 2 November 1914; Leuben, Kingdom of Saxony, German Empire
- Died: 5 February 1995 (aged 80)
- Military career
- Allegiance: East Germany
- Branch: Land Forces of the National People's Army
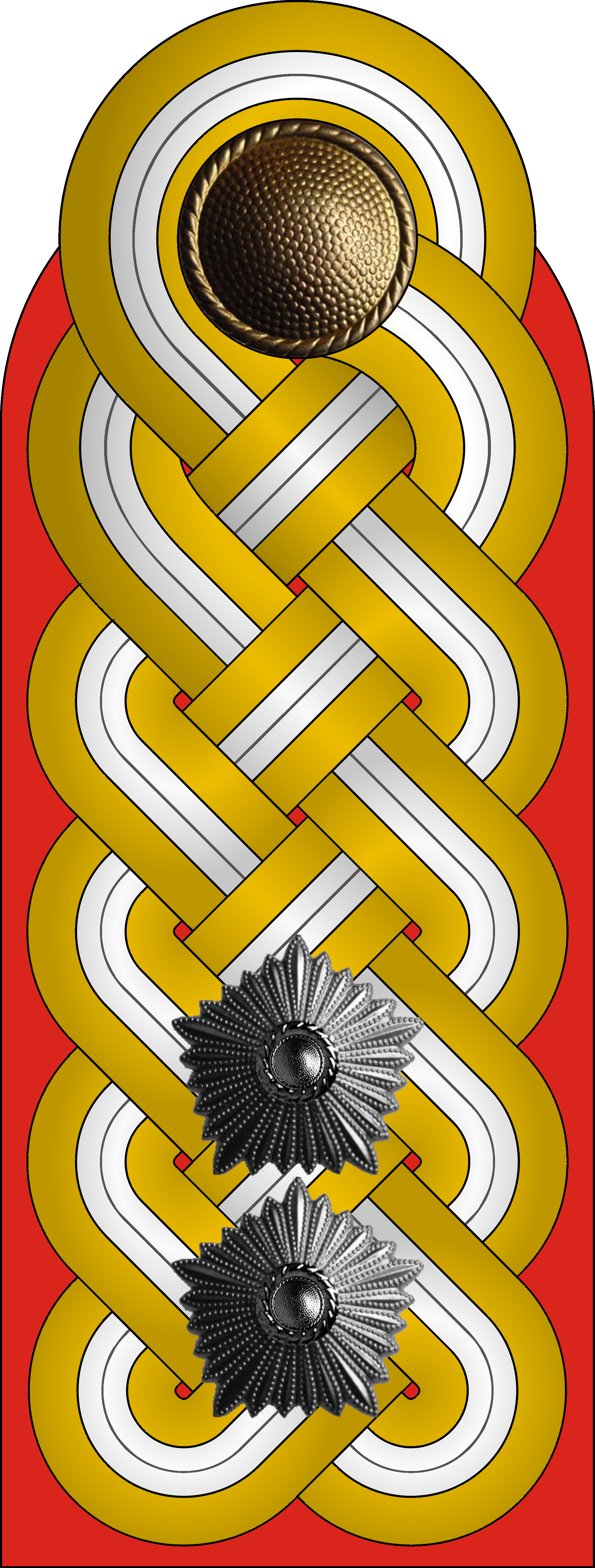
- Rank: Generalleutnant
- Commands: City Commandant of East Berlin (1971–1978)

Arthur Kunath (Leuben, 2 November 1914 – 5 February 1995) was a German military officer and a Generalleutnant of the East German National People's Army (NVA). He served as the City Commandant of East Berlin from 1 June 1971 to 31 August 1978.

== Literature ==
- Froh, Klaus; Wenzke, Rüdiger (2000), Die Generale und Admirale der NVA. Ein biographisches Handbuch (in German) (4th ed.), Berlin: Ch. Links, ISBN 3-86153-209-3

Military offices
Preceded by Helmut Poppe	City Commandant of East Berlin; 1 June 1971 – 31 August 1978	Succeeded by Karl-Heinz Drews
