= Hanna Tervanotko =

Finnish-born Canadian historian of religion

Hanna Tervanotko (born in Vantaa, Finland) is a Finnish-born Canadian historian of religion. She is an assistant professor in the Department of Religious Studies at McMaster University in Ontario, Canada. Her research focuses on the Second Temple era and her research interests include women in antiquity, Qumran, Dead Sea Scrolls, and Jewish interpretation of scripture. She is affiliated with the Centre of Excellence "Changes in Sacred Texts and Traditions" (CSTT) at the University of Helsinki.

== Biography ==
Tervanotko earned her M.A. (2003) and Th.D. (2013) in Biblical Studies at the University of Helsinki. She also earned a Ph.D. in Jewish Studies at the University of Vienna in 2013 under a cotutelle de thèse agreement between the two universities. After accomplishing her dissertation Tervanotko was awarded the Academy of Finland postdoctoral grant (2014–2017). Tervanotko has also studied at New York University (NYU), Yale University, KU Leuven and University of Groningen. In her doctoral dissertation Tervanotko analyzed the figure of Miriam in ancient Jewish literature. Her work Denying Her Voice: The Figure of Miriam in Ancient Jewish Literature continues this interest. From 2013 to 2017 Tervanotko was a post-doctoral researcher at the University of Helsinki. She currently works on projects in which she compares the Jewish and Greek prophetic figures in the context of the literature of the Second Temple era, themes that developed out of her post-doctoral research.

Tervanotko was invited to be one of the guest speakers in the first TEDxBrusselsWomen forum in 2016.

In mid-2026, she has a h-index of 9.

== Bibliography ==
=== Monographs ===
- Denying Her Voice: The Figure of Miriam in Ancient Jewish Literature. Journal of Ancient Judaism Supplement Series 23. Göttingen: Vandenhoeck & Ruprecht, 2016. ISBN 9783525551059
- Signs and Meanings. University of California Press. 2026 ISBN 9780520436312

=== Edited volumes ===
- Crossing Imaginary Boundaries: The Dead Sea Scrolls in the Context of Second Temple Judaism. Ed. Mika S. Pajunen and Hanna Tervanotko; Publications of the Finnish Exegetical Society 108; Helsinki: Finnish Exegetical Society, 2015.

=== Edited journals ===
- "Female Prophets." Thematic issue published in Journal of Ancient Judaism 3/2015. Ed. Hanna Tervanotko, Maxine L. Grossman, Alex P. Jassen, and Armin Lange.

=== Journal articles ===
- "Unreliability and Gender? Untrusted Female Prophets in Ancient Greek and Jewish Texts," Journal of Ancient Judaism 3 (2015): 358–381.
- "Members of the Levite Family and Ideal Marriages in Aramaic Levi Document, Visions of Amram, and Jubilees," Revue de Qumrân 106 (2015): 155–176.
- "Obey me like your mother" (L.A.B. 33:1) Deborah's Leadership in Light of Liber Antiquitatum Biblicarum 33," Journal for the Study in the Pseudepigrapha 24 (2015): 301–323.
- "The Significance of the Dead Sea Scrolls for Understanding the Development of Pentateuchal Rewritings," [in Finnish]. With Jessi Orpana. Teologinen Aikakauskirja 3 (2013): 224–234.
- "Women and Qumran Movement: Did Women Belong to the Movement?" [in Finnish]. Teologinen Aikakauskirja 3 (2013): 279–282.

=== Essays ===
- "‘The princess did provide all things, as though I were her own’ (Exagoge 37–38): Reading Exodus 2 in Late Second Temple Era" in The Bible and Women: An Encyclopedia of Exegesis and Cultural History. Part 3: Writings from the Second Temple Period. Ed. Eileen Schuller & Maria-Theres Wacker; The Bible and Women; Atlanta: Society of Biblical Literature. Published also in German, Spanish, and Italian, (in press).
- "Miriam Daughter of Bithiah," "Michal Daughter of David," "Mikneiah," "Miniamin," "Meunim," and "Molid" in Encyclopedia of Bible and its Reception 17. Ed. Juha Pakkala et al.; Berlin & Boston: Walter de Gruyter. Forthcoming 2017.
- "Magi and Magicians? A Comparative Study of Enchanters, Dream-Interpreters and Diviners in Ancient Jewish and Greek texts" [in Finnish] in Raamattu ja Magia. Ed. Kirsi Valkama, Hanne von Weissenberg & Nina Nikki; Publications of the Finnish Exegetical Society 110; Helsinki: Finnish Exegetical Society, 2016, 71–93.
- "4Q184 Lady Folly: A Shameless Woman" [in Finnish] in Kuolleenmeren kadonnut kansa. Ed. Raija Sollamo & Mika S. Pajunen; Helsinki: Gaudeamus, 2015, 364–365.
- "Gendered Beauty: Observations on Portraying Beautiful Men and Women in the Hebrew Bible" in So good, so beautiful: Brothers and sisters holding together – Wat goed is het, wat mooi! Broers en zussen sluiten zich aaneen. Ed. Peter Tomson & Jaap de Lange; Gorichem: Narratio, 2015, 41-52.
- "Visions, Otherworldly Journeys and Divine Beings: Figures of Levi and Amram as Communicators of Godly Will in the Dead Sea Scrolls" in Crossing Imaginary Boundaries: The Dead Sea Scrolls in the Context of Second Temple Judaism. Ed. Mika S. Pajunen & Hanna Tervanotko; Publications of the Finnish Exegetical Society 108; Helsinki: Finnish Exegetical Society, 2015, 210–238.
- "A Trilogy of Testaments: The Status of the Testament of Qahat versus Texts Attributed to Levi and Amram" in Old Testament Pseudepigrapha and the Scriptures. Ed. Eibert Tigchelaar; Bibliotheca ephemeridum theologicarum lovaniensium 270; Leuven: Peeters, 2014, 41-59.
- "Glaphyra Daughter of Archelaus of Cappadocia" and "Glaphyra Mother of Archelaus of Cappadocia" in Encyclopedia of Bible and its Reception 10. Ed. Dale C. Allison et al.; Berlin, Munich & Boston: Walter de Gruyter, 2014, 298.
- "Speaking in Dreams: The Figure of Miriam and Prophecy," in Prophets Male and Female: Gender and Prophecy in the Hebrew Bible, the Eastern Mediterranean, and the ancient Near East. Ed. Corinne L. Carvalho and Jonathan Stökl. Ancient Israel and Its Literature 15; Atlanta: Society of Biblical Literature, 2013, 147–168.
- "You Shall See: Rebekah’s Farewell Address in 4Q364 II, 1-6" in The Hebrew Bible in Light of the Dead Sea Scrolls. Ed. Nóra Dávid, Armin Lange, Kristin De Troyer, and Shani Tzoref; Forschungen zur Religion und Literatur des Alten und Neuen Testaments 239; Göttingen: Vandenhoeck & Ruprecht, 2011, 413-426.
- "hrh – pregnancy," and " ’em – mother," Theological Dictionary of the Qumran Manuscripts / Theologisches Wörterbuch zu den Qumrantexten. Band I. Ed. Heinz-Josef Fabry & Ulrich Dahmen; Stuttgart: Kohlhammer, 2011, 818–822.
- "Miriam Misbehaving? The Figure of Miriam in 4Q377 in Light of Ancient Jewish Literature" in Dead Sea Scrolls in Context. Ed. Armin Lange, Emanuel Tov, and Matthias Weigold; Vetus Testamentum Supplements 140/1; Leiden: Brill, 2010, 309–324.
- "Miriam’s Mistake: Numbers 12 Renarrated in Demetrius the Chronographer, 4Q377 (Apocryphal Pentateuch B), Legum Allegoriae and the Pentateuchal Targumim" in Embroidered Garments: Priests and Gender in Biblical Israel. Ed. Deborah W. Rooke; Hebrew Bible Monographs 25; Sheffield: Sheffield Phoenix Press, 2009, 131–150.
- "The Hope of the Enemy has Perished: The Figure of Miriam in the Dead Sea Scrolls" in From Qumran to Aleppo: A Discussion with Emanuel Tov about the Textual History of Jewish Scriptures in Honor of his 65th Birthday. Ed. József Zsengellér, Armin Lange, and Matthias Weigold; Forschungen zur Religion und Literatur des Alten und Neuen Testaments 230; Göttingen: Vandenhoeck & Ruprecht, 2009, 156-175.
