= Hanna Lundqvist =

Swedish footballer (born 1990)

Personal information
- Full name: Hanna Lundqvist
- Date of birth: 30 September 1990 (age 36)
- Place of birth: Sweden
- Height: 1.67 m (5 ft 6 in)
- Position: Forward

Senior career*
Years	Team	Apps	(Gls)
2008–2014	Enskede IK	66	(21)
2015–2017	Djurgården	66	(9)
2018	Hammarby	22	(1)
2019	Södersnäckornas BK	18	(2)
2020–2021	Stureby FF	23	(2)
2022–2023	IK Tun	20	(4)

Managerial career
- 2024: IK Tun
- * Club domestic league appearances and goals as of 16:48, 31 May 2026 (UTC)

Hanna Lundqvist (born 30 September 1990) is a Swedish football coach and former footballer who played for Enskede IK, Djurgården, Hammarby, Södersnäckornas BK, and Stureby FF and both played and coached IK Tun.

Lundqvist suffered a cruciate ligament injury during the 2023 season which forced her to retire from playing; ahead of the next season, she became head coach of the club. However, Lundqvist was taken ill just weeks before the season began and assistant coach Hanna Lundmark — who also suffered a knee injury that forced retirement whilst playing for Tun in 2023 — took up the position.
