= Hanna Eriksson =

Hanna Eriksson is the name of:

- Hanna Eriksson (swimmer, born 1984), Swedish swimmer, silver medallist at the 2004 FINA World Swimming Championships (25 m)
- Hanna Eriksson (swimmer, born 1999), Swedish swimmer at the 2019 World Aquatics Championships
