= Hanna Linderstål =

Swedish business executive and entrepreneur

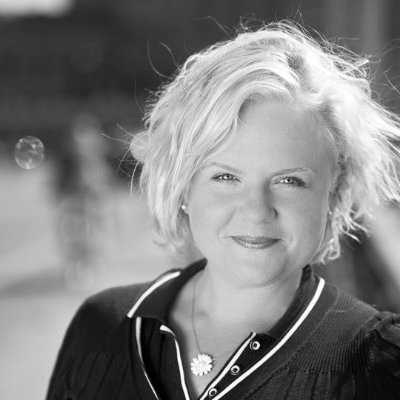
- Born: Stockholm, Sweden

Hanna Linderstål is a Swedish business executive, entrepreneur and the CEO of Earhart Business Protection Agency.

== Career ==
After mandatory military service, Linderstål began her professional career in the field of business protection and risk management and worked in information security. She is the founder of Earhart Business Protection Agency, a Swedish agency based in Stockholm that specializes in business protection services, including risk assessments, security consulting, crisis management, executive and board advisory.

Linderstål speaks about cyber security, security challenges and digital power. In 2016 she highlighted the risks with digital footprints being used for targeting social media with focus on Facebook and Twitter. In 2019 she was interviewed by the former Swedish media PS, the newspaper was closed down in 2021, the article was used as a parliamentary motion about social media app TikTok. In February 2020 Linderstål highlighted the risks on digital monitoring and lack of information security for employees in the Swedish largest union media Kollega. In March 2020 she was interviewed by the Swedish national radio P1 about Internet trolling. In March 2020 she participated in the hybrid warfare exercise testing resilience to hybrid threats: a real-time case study at Friends of Europe. In 2020 she highlighted the risk with disinformation on social media. Her investigations led to a large media interest and articles in Politico, Financial times HBL in Finland, Swedish newspaper SvD, Swedish newspaper DN. She also wrote a chapter in the government initiated project "The democratic talk" together with her colleague Jessica Giandomenico. In March 2021 she participated in a debate with the Think tank Futurion. In June 2022 she participated in Friends of Europe event 21st century warfare a whole of society approach to resilience In October 2022 she was one of the speakers at the EU disinfolab annual disinformation conference In December 2022 she participated in European Centre of excellence for countering Hybrid threats wargame in Brussles where she also lead a panel discussion. In December 2022 Linderstål was a speaker at the Metaverse safety week 2022.

== Philanthropy and personal life ==
Hanna Linderstål is involved in philanthropic initiatives. She believes in giving back to the community and supporting causes that promote safety, education and empowerment. She was the convener for the consul for psychological defense, an initiative from the total defend association active from 2017 to 2022, a non profit, non political organisation in Sweden that discussed the need for an authority for psychological defense. She also has the role as vice president for the Swedish Psyops association a voluntary organization that supports authorities and the public with seminars and courses on how to identify disinformation. Linderstål is also co-chairman for the ITU WG metaverse TG Cybersecurity.
