= Hanna Ferlin =

Swedish photographer and suffragist

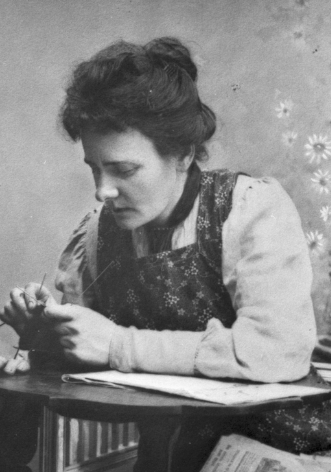
Hanna Ferlin

Hanna Augusta Ferlin (1870–1947) was a Swedish photographer and suffragist. After a period working as a photographer in Vänersborg, in 1904 she established her own studio in Färgelanda. In addition to portraits, she photographed landscapes of the surrounding area. She was also a keen proponent of women's voting rights, chairing the Färgelanda branch of the National Association for Women's Suffrage (LKPR) until 1913 when she left for the United States. She returned to Färgelanda seven years later, opening another studio.

== Biography ==
Born in Färgelanda on 15 August 1870, Hanna Augusta Ferlin was the daughter of the provost Johan Albert Ferlin and his wife Sofia née Söderqvist. She was the youngest of the family's nine children.

In the late 1890s, Hanna Ferlin embarked on her career working as assistant photographer for Karl and Alfred Vilner's studio in nearby Vänersborg where she acquired the skills of the trade. While there, she met the writer Birger Sjöberg who was serving an apprenticeship. In 1904, she returned to her native Vänersborg where she opened her own studio as "Hanna Ferlin" in the town. In addition to portraits, her work included landscapes, buildings, groups of people at work and social events such as weddings.

Ferlin was also a keen proponent of votes for women, chairing the Färgelanda branch of the LKPR (Landsföreningen för Kvinnans Politiska Rösträtt) until 1913. That year she moved to the United States, apparently because she was dissatisfied with progress on women's voting rights in Sweden. She returned seven years later, re-establishing a photo studio in Färgelanda. By that time, Sweden had achieved women's suffrage (agreed in 1919).

Hanna Ferlin died on 23 June 1947 and was buried in Färgelanda Cemetery.
