= Hanna Czeczott =

Polish botanist (1888-1982)

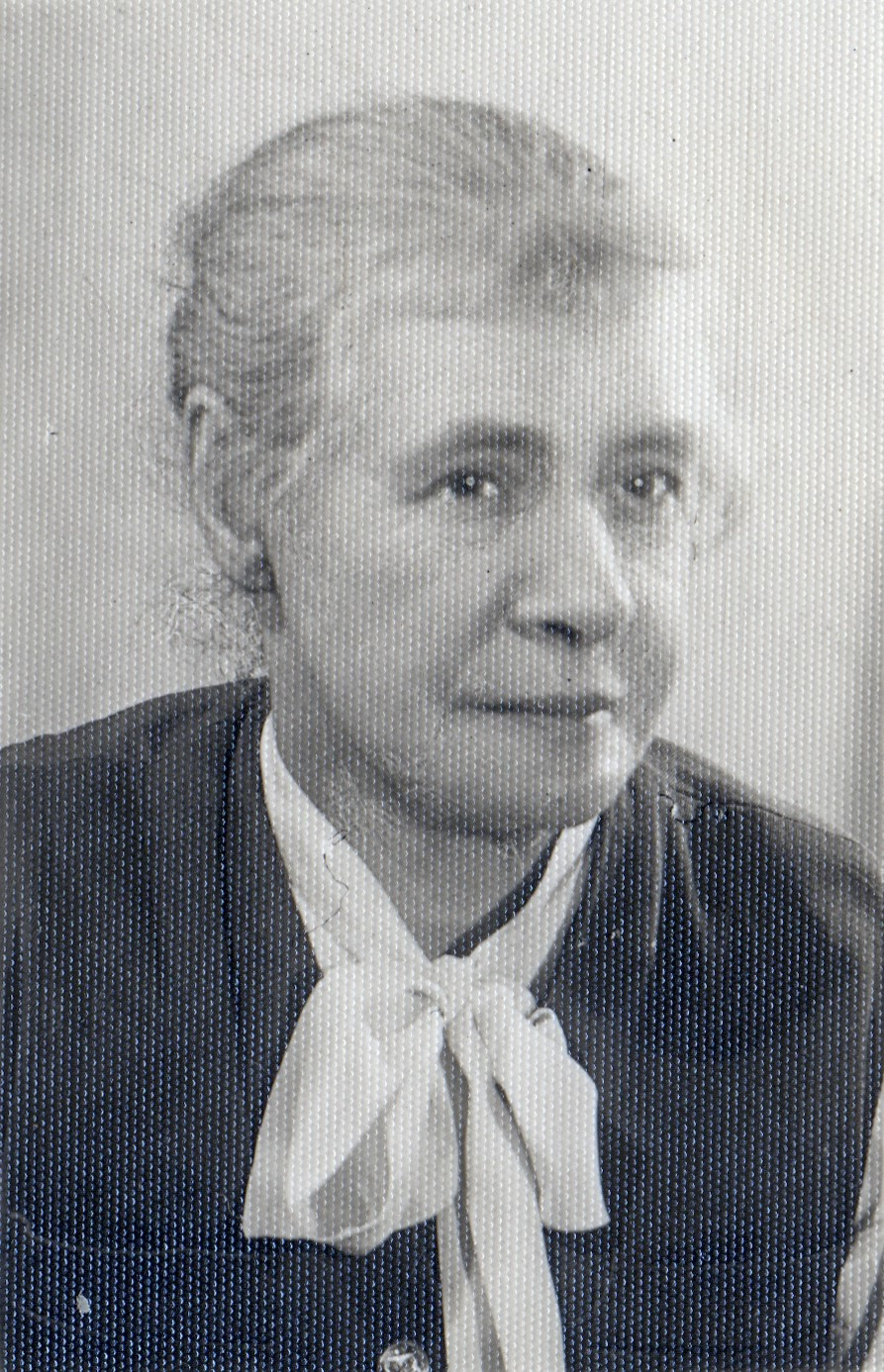
Hanna Czeczott

Hanna Czeczott (3 January 1888 – 17 March 1982) was a Polish botanist, and paleobiologist. She was awarded the Order of the Banner of Labour.

== Life ==
She was born in Saint Petersburg. She graduated from the Geographical Institute of Petersburg.

In 1910, she married mining engineer Henryk Czeczott. In 1935, she met William Culp Darrah at a European Conference. She worked at the Museum of the Earth. She studied Miocene flora fossils, and Baltic amber. Her botanical collections are held at the University of Warsaw

== Works ==
- A Contribution to the knowledge of the flora and vegetation of Turkey Verlag des Repertoriums, 1938
