= Hanna Hartman =

Swedish composer, sound artist, and performer

Hanna Hartman (born 1961 in Uppsala, Sweden) is a Swedish composer, sound artist and performer.

== Biography ==
From 1982 to 1988 Hanna Hartman studied literature and theatre history at the University of Stockholm, 1989–1991 she studied interactive media at the Dramatiska Institutet (national college of film, theatre, radio and interactive media) in Stockholm, and 1992 at EMS (Elektronmusikstudion), also in Stockholm. Since 1991 she has been working as a freelance employee at the Swedish, Danish and German radio, whereby she was working as dramaturge at the department for radio play at the Swedish Radio in 1996. In 1998 she moved her own studio to Copenhagen, later (in 2000) to Berlin.

In 2008/2009 Hanna Hartman was "Composer in Residence" at the Swedish radio. 2010 she got a scholarship at "Villa Aurora" in Los Angeles (US). Her compositions have been played at numerous festivals, such as the Wittener Tage für neue Kammermusik (2006), Darmstädter Ferienkurse (2012, 2014), Huddersfield Contemporary Music Festival (2013, 2016, 2017, 2018) and at ECLAT in Stuttgart (2017).

In the field of electroacoustic music, Hanna Hartman has composed works for radio and ensembles, did sound installations and has given numerous performances all over the world.

== Discography ==
Albums

- Hanna Hartman (2003, Elektron)
- Longitude/Cratere (2005, Komplott)
- Ailanthus (2007, Komplott)
- H^2 (2011, Komplott)

== Awards ==
- Prix Europa (1998)
- Karl-Sczuka-Preis (2005)
- Phonurgia Nova Prize (2006, 2016)
- Villa Aurora grant (2010)
- Rosenbergpriset (2011)
- Karl-Sczuka-Preis (2021)
