= Hanna Bergstrøm =

Norwegian trade unionist and politician

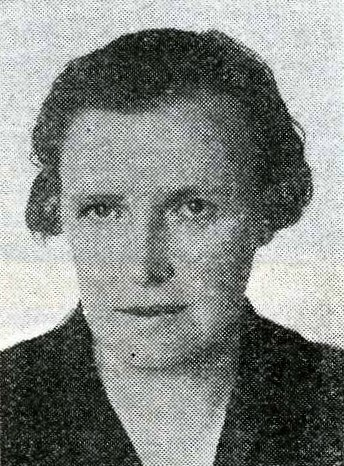

Hanna Marie K. Bergstrøm, née Magnusson (22 April 1885 – 1948) was a Norwegian trade unionist and politician for the Communist Party.

== Biography ==
She was born in Stockholm and founded a trade union in Malmö in 1906, but immigrated to Norway and Oslo. She worked as a seamstress, and was active in her trade union Syerskenes forening/Konfeksjonsarbeidernes forening. She joined the Communist Party in 1925, chaired its women's committee and became a member of the politburo in 1929. She stood for parliamentary election in 1927, 1930 and 1933. As she headed the ballot in the 1930 election, she was the only female top candidate in the three first elections contested by the Communist Party (1924, 1927, 1930). She was also a board member of the trade union Skredderforbundet from 1928, but was excluded in 1931.

During the occupation of Norway by Nazi Germany in 1942 she was incarcerated at Bredtveit concentration camp from 17 August to 14 December 1944. After the Second World War she stood for election in 1945. She died three years later.
