= Hanna Muller =

South African water polo player

Personal information
- Born: 16 November 1999 (age 26)

Sport
- Sport: Water polo

Hannah Muller (born 16 November 1999) is a South African water polo player.

She was a member of the South Africa women's national water polo team at the 2020 Tokyo Summer Olympics, where they ranked 10th.

== Career statistics ==
Event	Country	Rank	Date	Points
FINA World Women's Youth Water Polo Championships 2016	NZL	14	16 DEC 2016	13 - 12
FINA World Women's Junior Waterpolo Championships 2017	GRE	15	07 SEP 2017	14 - 3
FINA Women's Water Polo World Cup 2018	RUS	8	09 SEP 2018	8 - 6
FINA World Women's Junior Waterpolo Championships 2019	POR	12	14 SEP 2019	7 - 15
Tokyo Summer Olympic Games 2020	JAP	10	01 AUG 2021	14 - 1
