= Hanna Rautenbach =

German politician (1889–1981)

Hanna Staubes Hanna Rautenbach
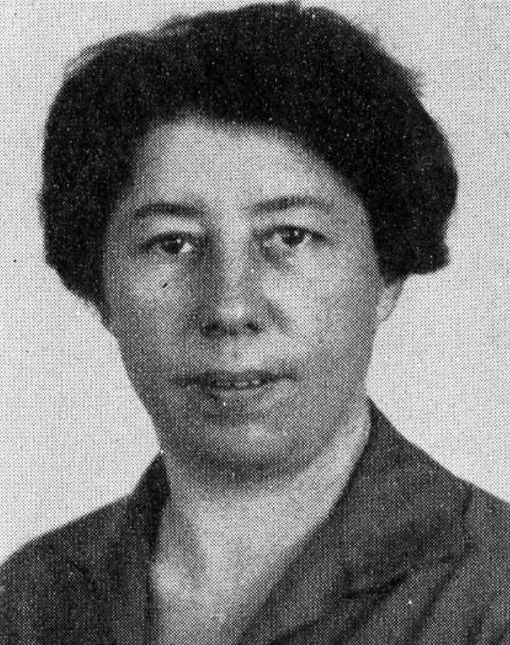
- Staubes c. 1932
- Born: Hanna Weber; 28 May 1889; Horn, Principality of Lippe, Germany
- Died: 27 August 1981 (aged 92); Solingen, West Germany
- Occupation: Politician
- Political party: SPD; USPD; KPD; DKP
- Spouse(s): 1. Walter Staubes; 2. Otto Rautenbach

Hanna Rautenbach (born Hanna Weber: 28 May 1889 – 27 August 1981) was a German politician (KPD).

== Life ==
Hanna Weber was born into a working-class family in Horn, a small town in the countryside to the north of Paderborn. As a young woman she worked in domestic service and as an unskilled worker in Solingen and Düsseldorf. In 1911 she married her first husband, Walter Staubes.

Hanna Staubes joined the Social Democratic Party ("Sozialdemokratische Partei Deutschlands" / SPD) in 1915. The decision of the party leadership to instigate what amounted to a parliamentary truce over voting to fund the war had been contentious within the party from the outset, and the intensity of internal dissent grew as the slaughter on the battle front and destitution on the home front intensified. In 1917 the party split, and Hanna Staubes was part of the dissident faction that now defected to the Independent Social Democratic Party ("Unabhängige Sozialdemokratische Partei Deutschlands" / USPD). She was also a member of the pacifist Spartacus League, and as the USPD itself broke apart after the war she was part of the leftwing majority that joined the newly formed Communist Party: she was a co-founder of the local Solingen branch.

She became the leader of the women's group for the party's Solingen sub-district team ("Unterbezirksleitung"), and in 1929 was elected to the city council. In 1930 she was elected a member of the Rheinland provincial parliament ("Provinziallandtag"). She was then elected, in April 1932, to the Prussian Parliament ("Landtag"), in which represented the Düsseldorf East electoral district, remaining a member till the abolition of democracy in 1933. Staubes was also, in 1931, a co-organiser of the "Red Rhine-Ruhr Congress of Working Women".

Change of government in January 1933 turned out to be the prelude to a rapid transition to one-party dictatorship. The Reichstag fire in February 1933 was immediately blamed on "communists", and during the next few months the authorities detained large numbers of politically active people, concentrating especially on those who were or had been Communist Party members. Hanna Staubes was arrested in July 1933 and held in "investigative detention" in prison in Düsseldorf till April 1934, when she was transferred into "protective custody". During the next few months she was held in a succession of concentration camps. However, by the end of 1934 she had apparently been released, and was able to marry her second husband, Otto Rautenbach. She was re-arrested in August 1937 and imprisoned in Düsseldorf till October 1938.

The end of the Second World War in May 1945 brought about the downfall of the Nazi dictatorship, and Hanna Rautenbach was able to rejoin the Communist Party, working as a party official in Solingen and, from November 1945, in the city administration. It being not immediately possible to organise municipal elections the British forces administering this part of Germany initially sought to recreate the pre-Nazi parliamentary institutions allocating seats based on the last democratic elections, being those held in 1932. When regional elections were held on 10 April 1947 the Communist party received enough votes to give it 28 seats in the 216 seat regional parliament ("Landtag") in the newly configured state of North Rhine-Westphalia, and one of these went to Hanna Rautenbach. She remained a member till 1950.

Following the blockade of West Berlin in 1949 and the uncompromising suppression of the East German uprising in 1953, Cold War tensions between the two German states intensified, and in August 1956 the Communist Party of Germany was outlawed by the West Germany constitutional court. Over the next decade, however, the relations between East and West Germany became less antagonistic, in 1968 a new version of the former party was launched as the German Communist Party ( "Deutsche Kommunistische Partei" / DKP), notionally as "an entirely new party". Hanna Rautenbach was by now aged 79 and no longer politically or professionally active. Nevertheless, she lost no time in joining the "new" DKP.

Hanna Staubes-Rautenbach died at Solingen on 27 August 1981.

== Personal ==
Hanna Rautenbach's elder brother, Hermann Weber (1888–1937) also achieved notability as a Communist activist and, ultimately, as a victim of Stalin's purges.
