= Hanna Bogucka =

Polish telecommunications engineer

Hanna Bogucka is a Polish telecommunications engineer, professor dr. hab. engineer, corresponding member of the Polish Academy of Sciences (since 2016).

As of 2020, she is full professor and director at the Institute of Wireless Communications, Poznań University of Technology, Member of the Presidium of the Poznań Branch of PAS (since 2019).

She authored 180 research papers, 3 handbooks in radio communications and digital signal processing and 3 monographs on flexible and cognitive radio.

Hanna Bogucka has been appointed IEEE Communications Society Director of the EAME Region (Europe, Africa, Middle East) (2014-2015) and elected IEEE Radio Communications Committee Chair for the term of 2015–2016.
