= Hanna Herbst =

German journalist and author (born 1990)

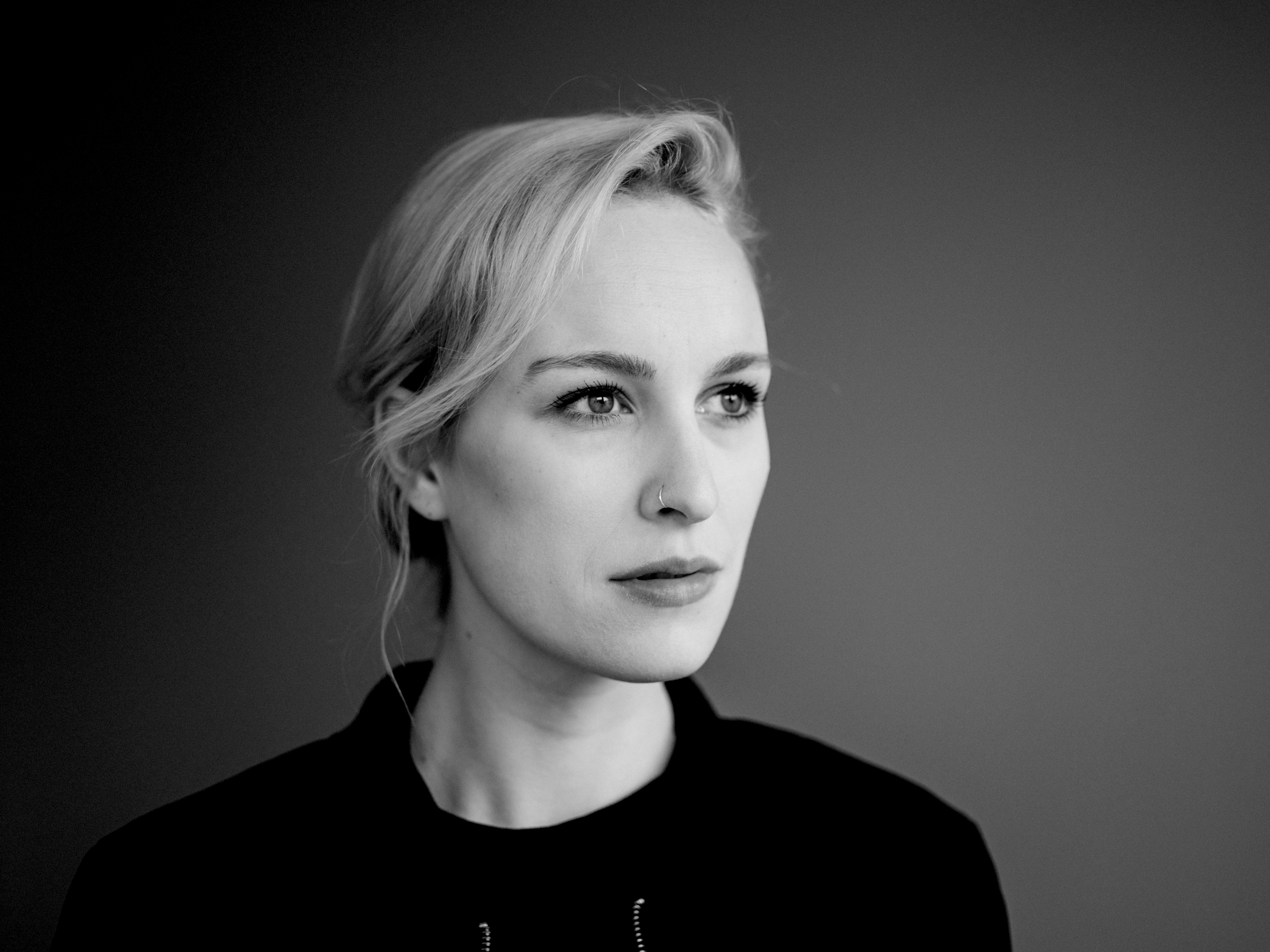
- Born: 1990

Hanna Herbst (born 1990 Mainz) is a German journalist and author.

== Life ==
Herbst was born in Mainz, and moved to Salzburg in 1998. From 2008, she studied Political Science in Vienna. From September 2015, she was Deputy Editor-in-Chief of Vice Austria. In 2016, Forbes named her as one of 30 people in Austria under 30.

== Works ==
- Feministin sagt man nicht. Wien: Christian Brandstätter Verlag 2018. ISBN 978-3-7106-0194-1
