= Hanna Kunath =

German aviator (1909–1994)

Hanna Kunath (6 November 1909 - 18 February 1994) was a German pilot.

== Biography ==
Kunath first became interested in aviation when she visited Bremen Airport with her brother and father in 1922. 10 years later she and two other women enrolled in pilot training at the Bremen Academy of Aviation; the other women eventually withdrew from their studies and Kunath became Bremen's first woman pilot, graduating in 1934.

In the build-up to World War II aeroplanes in Germany were predominantly used for military training, and Kunath found it difficult to find aircraft to fly. Instead, in 1938, she took up gliding and founded a women's gliding group, which she led until 1943. With the outbreak of war, women were asked to transport aeroplanes or instruct pilots, however Kunath declined these positions. Instead she trained young women as pilots in Wildeshausen and Garstedt.

In 1951, following the end of the war, Kunath renewed her gliding license and in 1956 renewed her light aircraft licence. From 1968 she was involved in the Association of German Pilots, holding the position of press officer and chair of Lower Saxony, Hamburg and Bremen, and was a founding member of the Lauenburg Aero Club. She was also Governor of the German branch of the Féderation des Pilotes Européenes.

Kunath continued to fly into her later years, and at the age of 84 was named Germany's oldest pilot.

=== Personal life ===
In 1955 Kunath married Werner Hübner.

=== Recognition ===
Hanna-Kunath-Straße (Hanna-Kunath Street) in Bremen-Neustadt at Bremen Airport was named after her in 1995.
