= Hanna von Pestalozza =

German writer (1877–1963)

Hanna Countess von Pestalozza (actually Brunhilde Countess von Schlippenbach; * (December 23, 1877, Kissingen – July 15, 1963, Groß Glienicke) was a German writer. She published under her maiden name.

== Life ==
Pestalozza received her doctorate in 1921 with a historical review of coeducation of the sexes in Germany. She advocated the self-determination of woman, also called selfhood at the time. Her textbook Geschichtserzählungen went through many editions.

From 1930 to 1935 she was financially supported by the German Schiller Foundation. In February 1936, it signed a church-political appeal by the theologians August Schowalter and Georg Stuhlfauth to

renew and expand the Protestant Church as a people's church and to enable the fighting parties to unite.

After the end of the war, her writing Ich will dienen (1935) was placed on the List of literature to be discarded in the Soviet Occupation Zone.

In Groß Glienicke, an elementary school is named after her.

== Writings ==
- Ihre Seele. In: Kaufhaus N. Israel, Berlin: Album 1913. Die Frau im Jahrhundert der Energie. (Elsner) Berlin 1912.
- Die Grenzen der Erziehung. Beyer & Söhne, Langensalza 1919
- Doctoral thesis: Der Streit um die Koedukation in den letzten 30 Jahren in Deutschland. Beyer & Mann, Langensalza 1921
- Erziehung und Berufswahl. Langensalza. Beyer. 1921
- with Theodor Steudel: Geschichtserzählungen für die Unterstufe. Teubner Verlag, Leipzig / Berlin 1926 (Volume 1 of Teubners Geschichtliches Unterrichtswerk.)
- Augustin und Monika: Die Geschichte von Mutter und Sohn. A cultural-historical novella. Darmstadt. E. Hofmann. 1930
- Selbst ist - die Frau. In: Berliner Tageblatt (Sunday edition), February 5, 1933, p. 16
- Ich will dienen. A woman experiences and confesses the fullness of German destiny. Runge, Berlin-Neutempelhof 1935
- Alte Mutter. Letters. Berlin 1938
