= Hanna Lachert =

Polish architect (1927–2021)

- Born: 19 March 1927
- Died: 18 April 2021 (aged 94)
- Occupation: architect

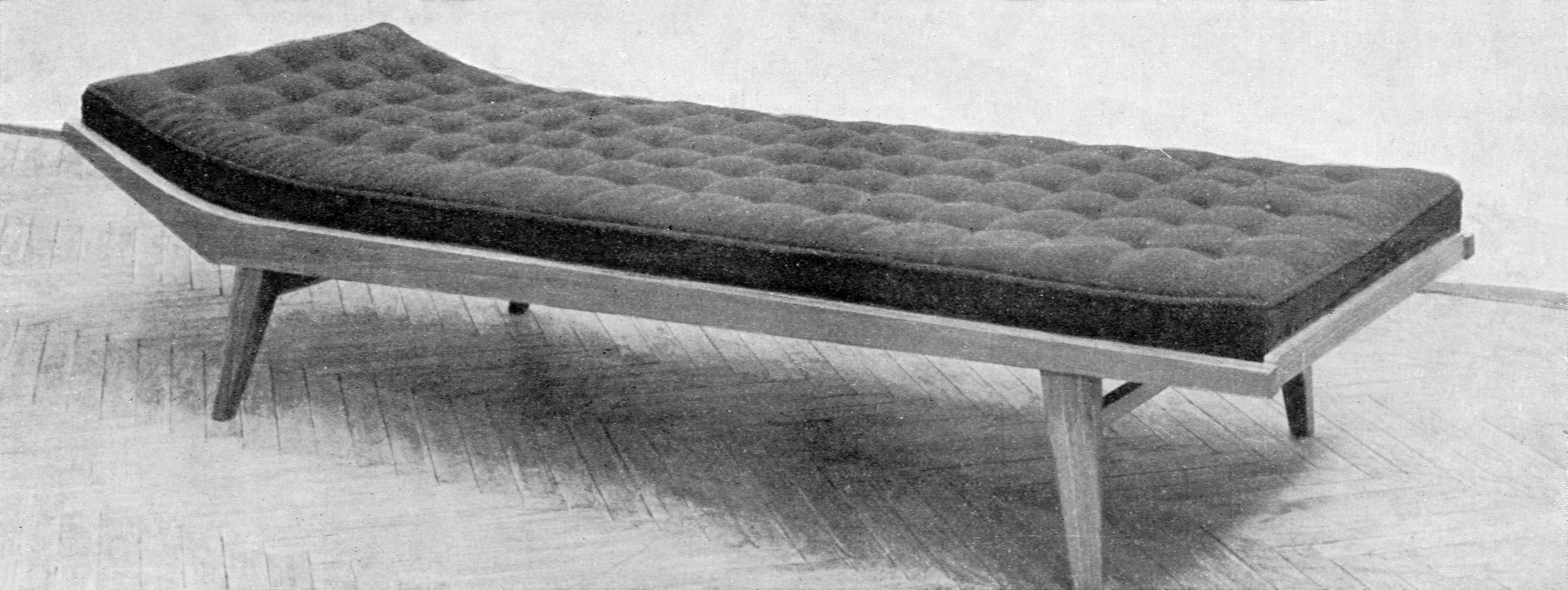
Couch designed by Lachert

Hanna Lachert (19 March 1927 – 18 April 2021) was a Polish interior architect and furniture designer. She was seen as one of the most outstanding designers of Polish applied art of the 20th century.

Born on 19 March 1927, her parents, Tadeusz Sobocki and Maria Jaworska were heavily involved in the architect business. After growing up in Warsaw, her family moved several times until settling in 1940 in Nowy Zjazd. The rest of WWII saw her acting as a nurse during the events of the Warsaw Uprising before returning home after the war.

Lachert died on 18 April 2021, aged 94.
