= General Cooper =

General Cooper may refer to:

- Douglas H. Cooper (1815–1879), Confederate States Army brigadier general
- Edward Cooper (British Army officer) (1858–1945), British Army major general
- George Cooper (British Army officer) (1925–2020), British Army general
- James Cooper (Pennsylvania politician) (1810–1863), Maryland Volunteers brigadier general in the American Civil War
- John Cooper (British Army officer) (born 1955), British Army lieutenant general
- John B. Cooper (fl. 1980s–2010s), U.S. Air Force lieutenant general
- Joseph Alexander Cooper (1823–1910), Union Army brigadier general and brevet major general
- Kenneth Cooper (British Army officer) (1905–1981), British Army major general
- Matthew T. Cooper (born 1934), U.S. Marine Corps lieutenant general
- Nathan A. Cooper (1802–1879), New Jersey state cavalry brigadier general
- Samuel Cooper (general) (1798–1876), Confederate States Army general
- Simon Cooper (British Army officer) (born 1936), British Army major general
- William E. Cooper (general) (born 1929) U.S. Army major general

== See also ==
- Attorney General Cooper (disambiguation)
