= General Johnston =

General Johnston may refer to:

== United Kingdom ==
- Alexander C. Johnston (1884–1952), British Army brigadier general
- James Johnston (British Army officer, born 1721) (1721–1795), British Army general
- James Johnston (British Army officer, died 1797) (c. 1721–1797), British Army general
- James Johnston (British Army officer, born 1911) (1911–1988), British Army major general
- Maurice Robert Johnston (1929–), British Army lieutenant general
- Thomas Henry Johnston (British Army officer), British Army general

== United States ==
- Albert Sidney Johnston (1803–1862), Confederate States Army general
- Gary W. Johnston (fl. 2010s–2020s), U.S. Army major general
- George Doherty Johnston (1837–1919), Confederate States Army brigadier general
- John Alexander Johnston (1858–1940), U.S. Army brigadier general
- Joseph E. Johnston (1807–1891), Confederate States Army general & United States Army brigadier general
- Richard C. Johnston (fl. 1980s–2010s), U.S. Air Force Major general
- Robert B. Johnston (1937–), U.S. Marine Corps Lieutenant general
- Robert Daniel Johnston (1837–1919), Confederate States Army brigadier general
- William Johnston Jr. (1861–1933), U.S. Army major general

== Others ==
- George Johnston (general) (1868–1949), Australian Army major general
- George Napier Johnston (1867–1947), Australian Army major general
- Francis Earl Johnston (1871–1917), New Zealand Army brigadier general

== See also ==
- George Johnstone (British Army officer), whose name is sometimes spelled "Johnston"
- Robert Maxwell Johnstone (1914–1990), British Army major general
