= Paul Greening =

Royal Navy Rear-Admiral (1928–2008)

Rear-Admiral Sir Paul Greening GCVO
- Born: 4 June 1928; Steyning, Sussex, England
- Died: 5 November 2008 (aged 80); Fareham, Hampshire, England
- Military career
- Allegiance: United Kingdom
- Branch: Royal Navy
- Service years: 1946–1985
- Rank: Rear-Admiral
- Commands: HMS Asheldham; HMS Messina; HMS Lewiston; HMS Jaguar; HMS Aurora
- Awards: Knight Grand Cross of the Royal Victorian Order

Rear-Admiral Sir Paul Woollven Greening GCVO (4 June 1928 – 5 November 2008) was a Royal Navy officer and courtier, who served as Naval Secretary and Master of the Household.

== Naval career ==
Educated at Mowden School and the Nautical College at Pangbourne, Greening joined the Royal Navy in 1946. He was given command of the minesweepers HMS Asheldham, HMS Messina, HMS Lewiston and then the frigate HMS Jaguar. He was appointed Fleet Plans Officer for the Far East Fleet in 1969 and, following his promotion to captain, given command of the frigate HMS Aurora in 1970. He went on to be Captain, Naval Drafting in 1971, Director of Seaman Officer Appointments in 1974 and Captain of the Royal Naval College, Dartmouth in 1976. Promoted to rear admiral, he became Naval Secretary in 1978 and Flag Officer, Royal Yachts with specific responsibility for HM Yacht Britannia in 1981. He was responsible for planning the honeymoon of the Prince and Princess of Wales in August 1981. He retired in 1985.

He was appointed an Extra Equerry to the Queen in 1983 and Master of the Household of the Sovereign from 1986 to 1992.

== Family ==
In 1951 he married Monica West (pre-deceased); they had a son and daughter.

Military offices
Preceded by Peter Buchanan	Naval Secretary; 1978–1980	Succeeded by Richard Fitch
Court offices
Preceded by Sir Peter Ashmore	Master of the Household; 1986–1992	Succeeded by Sir Simon Cooper
