= William Andrew Evans =

British Army general

Major-General William Andrew Evans CB DL
- Military career
- Allegiance: United Kingdom
- Branch: British Army
- Service years: 1959–1992
- Rank: Major-General
- Commands: 5th Royal Inniskilling Dragoon Guards; 4th Armoured Brigade; Eastern District
- Conflicts: Northern Ireland
- Awards: Companion of the Order of the Bath

Major-General William Andrew Evans CB DL (born August 1939) is a former British Army officer.

== Military career ==
Educated at Sherborne School, Royal Military Academy Sandhurst and Christ Church, Oxford, Evans was commissioned into the 5th Royal Inniskilling Dragoon Guards in 1959. He became commanding officer of the 5th Royal Inniskilling Dragoon Guards in 1980. He went on to be commander of 4th Armoured Brigade in 1983, Assistant Chief of Staff, Operations, British Army of the Rhine in 1987 and General Officer Commanding Eastern District in 1989 before retiring in 1992.

He was appointed a Companion of the Order of the Bath in the 1993 New Year Honours. and was a Deputy Lieutenant of Essex.

Military offices
Preceded by Peter Graham	General Officer Commanding Eastern District; 1989–1992	Succeeded by Michael Walker
