= Admiral Miller =

Admiral Miller may refer to:

- Andrew Miller (Royal Navy officer) (1926–1986), British Royal Navy rear admiral
- DeWolfe Miller III (born 1959), U.S. Navy vice admiral
- Francis Spurstow Miller (1863–1954), British Royal Navy admiral
- Gerald E. Miller (1919–2014), U.S. Navy vice admiral
- John W. Miller (1970s–2010s), U.S. Navy vice admiral
- Michael H. Miller (born 1952), U.S. Navy vice admiral
- Paul David Miller (born 1941), U.S. Navy admiral

== See also ==
- J. Donald Millar (1934–2015), National Institute for Occupational Safety and Health rear admiral
