= Peter Hudson (disambiguation) =

Peter Hudson (born 1946) is an Australian rules football player.

Peter Hudson may also refer to:

- Sir Peter Hudson (British Army officer) (1923–2000), British general
- Peter Hudson (1930–1992), Australian-born New Zealand chef on the TV cookery show Hudson and Halls
- Peter Hudson (Royal Navy officer) (born 1961), British admiral
- Peter Hudson (darts player) (born 1984), English darts player
