= General Watson =

General Watson may refer to:

- Andrew Watson (British Army officer) (born 1927), British Army major general
- Daril Watson (1888−1967), British Army general
- David Watson (general) (1869–1922), Canadian Corps major general
- Edwin "Pa" Watson (1883–1945), U.S. Army major general
- Harry Davis Watson (1866–1945), British Army major general
- James Watson (British Army officer) (1772–1862), British Army lieutenant general
- John Watson (Indian Army officer) (1829–1919), British Indian Army general
- Leroy H. Watson (1893–1975), U.S. Army major general
- Thomas E. Watson (USMC) (1892–1966), U.S. Marine Corps lieutenant general
