= Charles Ramsay (British Army officer, born 1936) =

British Army officer (1936–2017)

Major-General Charles Ramsay CB OBE
- Born: 12 October 1936
- Died: 31 December 2017 (aged 81)
- Military career
- Allegiance: United Kingdom
- Branch: British Army
- Rank: Major-General
- Commands: Royal Scots Dragoon Guards; Task Force Delta; Eastern District
- Awards: Companion of the Order of the Bath; Officer of the Order of the British Empire

Major-General Charles Alexander Ramsay CB OBE (12 October 1936 – 31 December 2017) was a British Army officer.

== Personal life ==
He married, in 1967, Mary MacAndrew with whom he had four children.

== Military career ==
Ramsay was born the second son of Admiral Sir Bertram Ramsay. Educated at Eton College and the Royal Military Academy Sandhurst, he saw operational service as a squadron commander in Northern Ireland during The Troubles and went on to be commanding officer of the Royal Scots Dragoon Guards. After that he became Commander of 12th Armoured Brigade in Osnabruck in 1980, Deputy Director of Military Operations in 1983 and General Officer Commanding Eastern District in 1984. His last appointment was as Director of the Territorial Army and Organisation at the Ministry of Defence in 1987 before retiring in 1989.

He was Honorary Colonel of the Royal Scots Dragoon Guards from 1992 to 1998.

He was a member of the Queen's Body Guard for Scotland.

Military offices
| Preceded by John MacMillan | General Officer Commanding Eastern District; 1984–1987 | Succeeded by Peter Graham |
