= Mark Milbank =

British Army officer, courtier, and Master of the Household

Sir Mark Vane, Bt.
- Born: 11 January 1907
- Died: 4 April 1984 (aged 77)
- Military career
- Allegiance: United Kingdom
- Branch: British Army
- Service years: 1930–1945
- Rank: Major
- Unit: Coldstream Guards
- Conflicts: Second World War
- Awards: Knight Grand Cross of the Royal Victorian Order; Companion of the Order of the Bath; Commander of the Order of the British Empire; Mentioned in Dispatches

Major Sir Mark Vane Milbank, 4th Baronet, KCVO, MC (11 January 1907 – 4 April 1984) was a British Army officer and courtier, who served as Master of the Household from 1954 to 1967.

== Early life ==
He was the son of Sir Frederick Richard Milbank, 3rd Baronet and Harriet Anne Dorothy Wilson. He was educated at Eton College and the Royal Military College, Sandhurst.

== Military career ==
Milbank commissioned into the Coldstream Guards in 1930, and served as the Aide-de-Camp to the Governor of Bombay between 1933 and 1938. He saw active service in the Second World War, and was awarded the Military Cross in 1945.

== Courtier ==
He was Comptroller to the Governor General of Canada between 1946 and 1952, before being appointed Deputy Master of the Household. In 1953 Milbank became Master of the Household and was invested as a Member of the Royal Victorian Order. He held the position until 1967, became a CVO in 1958, and was knighted as a KCVO in 1962. Between 1954 and 1984 he was an Extra Equerry to Elizabeth II.

== Personal life ==
He played first-class cricket for the British Army cricket team in 1930. He married, firstly, Lady Angela Isabel Nellie Larnach-Nevill, daughter of Guy Larnach-Nevill, 4th Marquess of Abergavenny and Isabel Nellie Larnach, on 20 October 1930. They had no children, and he and Lady Angela Isabel Nellie Larnach-Nevill divorced in 1933. He married, secondly, Hon. Verena Aileen Maxwell, daughter of Arthur Maxwell, 11th Baron Farnham and Aileen Selina Coote, on 12 February 1938. Together they had two children.

On 29 April 1964 he succeeded to his father's baronetcy.

Court offices
Preceded by Sir Piers Legh	Master of the Household; 1954–1967	Succeeded by Sir Geoffrey Hardy-Roberts
Baronetage of the United Kingdom
Preceded by Frederick Milbank	Baronet (of Well and Hart); 1964–1984	Succeeded by Anthony Milbank
