= David Scott-Barrett =

Scottish military officer (1922–2003)

Lieutenant-General Sir David Scott-Barrett KBE MC
- Born: 16 December 1922; Cologne, Germany
- Died: 31 December 2003 (aged 81)
- Burial place: Dean Cemetery
- Military career
- Allegiance: United Kingdom
- Branch: British Army
- Service years: 1942−1979
- Rank: Lieutenant-General
- Service number: 224216
- Unit: Scots Guards
- Commands: 6th Infantry Brigade; Eastern District; British Forces in Berlin; Scotland
- Conflicts: World War II; Malayan Emergency
- Awards: Knight Commander of the Order of the British Empire; Military Cross

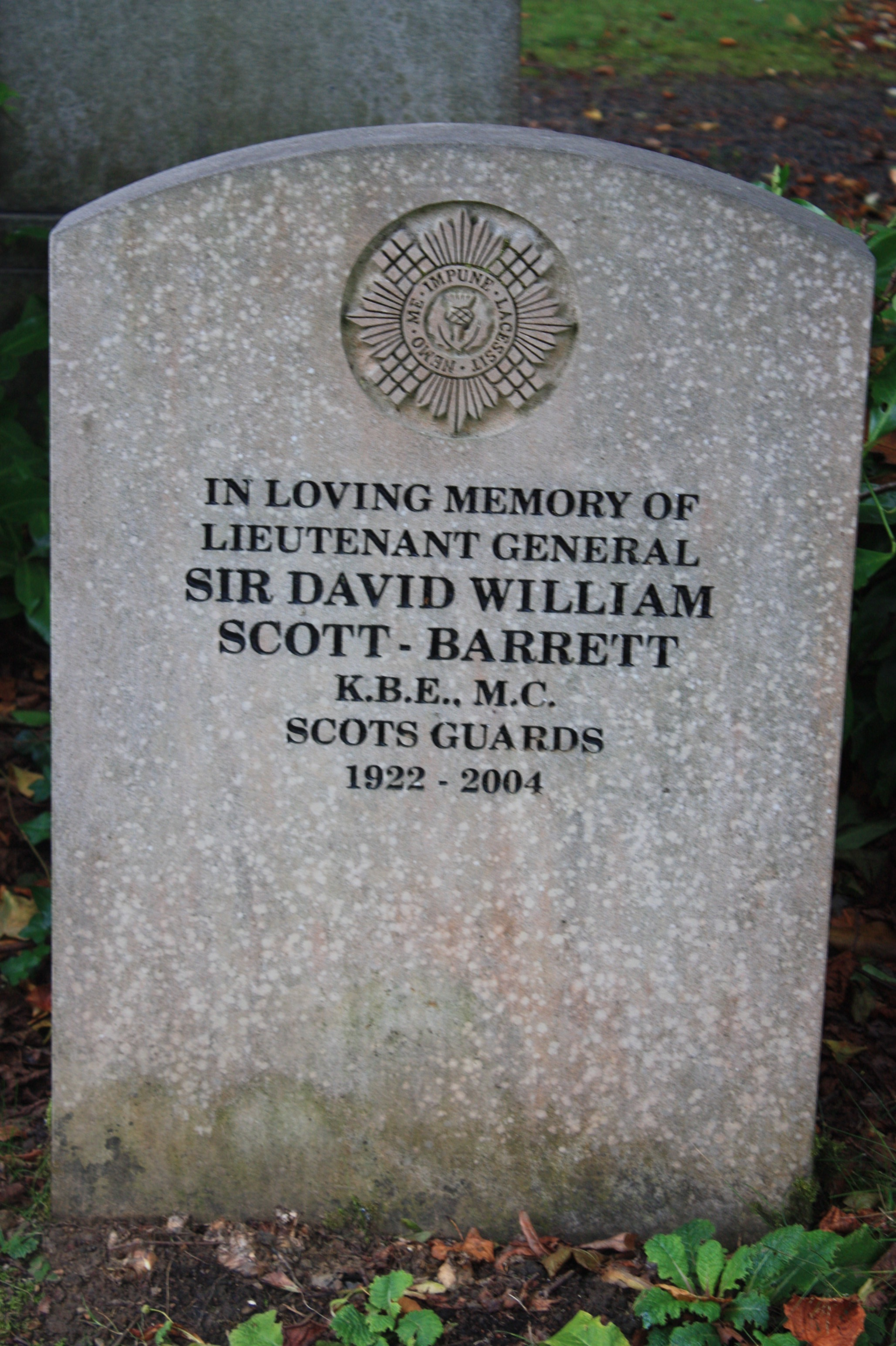
The grave of David William Scott-Barrett, Dean Cemetery

Lieutenant-General Sir David William Scott-Barrett KBE MC (16 December 1922 − 31 December 2003) was General Officer Commanding Scotland.

== Military career ==
The son of Brigadier Hugh Scott-Barrett, Judge Advocate General of the Army of the Rhine, who was later ordained, David Scott-Barrett was educated at Westminster School and was commissioned into the Scots Guards in 1942. He served in World War II with the 3rd Tank Battalion in North West Europe. In April 1945 he distinguished himself near Lüneburg by holding his position against determined German tank and infantry counter-attacks and was awarded the Military Cross for his actions.

After the War he company commander became a general staff officer at HQ Guards Division and in 1948 was appointed an equerry to the Duke of Gloucester. He served as a company commander with the 2nd Battalion of his Regiment during the Malayan Emergency. In 1961 he was made an instructor at the Staff College, Camberley and in 1965 he became a general staff officer with 4th Division. He was made commander of 6th Infantry Brigade in 1967.

In 1971 Scott-Barrett was appointed general officer commanding Eastern District and in 1973 he became Commandant of the British Sector in Berlin. He was appointed general officer commanding Scotland and Governor of Edinburgh Castle in 1976; he retired in 1979.

In retirement he became a director of Arbuthnot Securities.

He died on 31 December 2003 at the age of 81 and is buried in the northern extension to Dean Cemetery on Queensferry Road in Edinburgh. The grave faces north on the northmost path.

== Family ==
He married Marie Elise Morris in 1948; they had three sons. Following the death of his first wife, he married Judith Rogerson Waring in 1992, who survived him.

Military offices
Preceded by Jack Dye	GOC Eastern District; 1971−1973	Succeeded by Peter Hudson
Preceded by Lord Cathcart	Commandant, British Sector in Berlin; 1973−1975	Succeeded by Sir Roy Redgrave
Preceded by Sir Chandos Blair	GOC Scotland; 1976−1979	Succeeded by Sir Michael Gow
