= Jack Dye (British Army officer) =

Major-General Jack Dye CBE MC
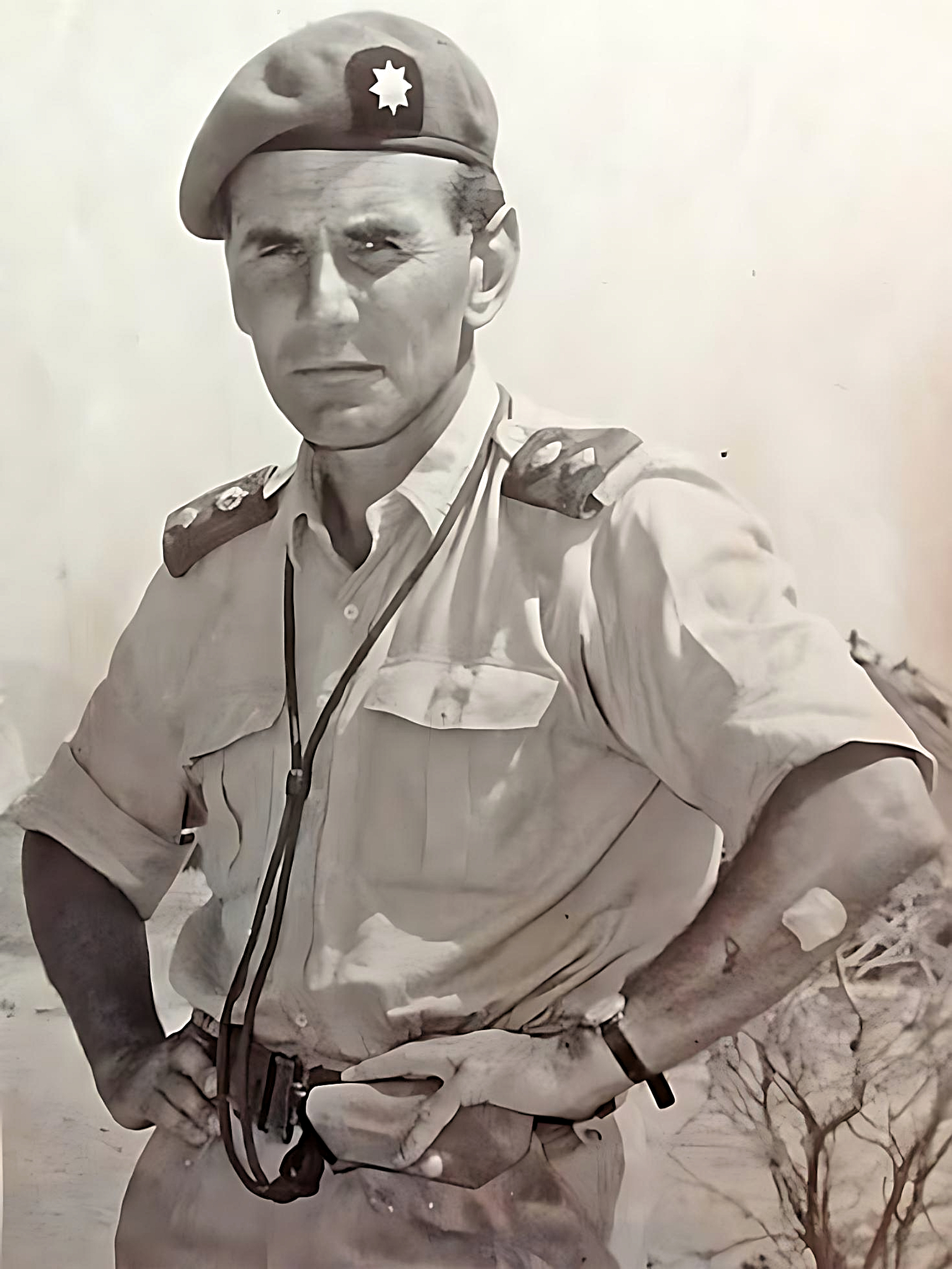
- Born: 13 December 1919; Great Yarmouth, Norfolk
- Died: 10 June 2013 (aged 93); Helmingham, Suffolk
- Military career
- Allegiance: United Kingdom
- Branch: British Army
- Service years: 1940−1974
- Rank: Major-General
- Service number: 148868
- Units: Royal Norfolk Regiment; Royal Anglian Regiment
- Commands: Eastern District
- Conflicts: Second World War
- Awards: Commander of the Order of the British Empire; Military Cross

Major-General Jack Bertie Dye, CBE, MC (13 December 1919 – 10 June 2013) was a British Army officer.

== Military career ==
Dye was commissioned into the Royal Norfolk Regiment on 13 September 1940. He took part in the Normandy landings in June 1944 during the Second World War. He became commanding officer of the 1st East Anglian Regiment in 1963 and fought against insurgents in Aden in May and June 1964 during the Aden Emergency and, following amalgamation, took command of new 1st Battalion, the Royal Anglian Regiment in September 1964.

He then became commander of the South Arabian Federation's Regular Army in 1966. He went on to be General Officer Commanding Eastern District in February 1969 and Director-General, Territorial Army in March 1971 before retiring in May 1974.

== Family ==
In 1942, he married Jean Prall; they had two daughters.

Military offices
Preceded by Fergus Ling	GOC Eastern District; 1969–1971	Succeeded by David Scott-Barrett
Honorary titles
Preceded by Sir Ian Freeland	Colonel of the Royal Anglian Regiment; 1976−1982	Succeeded by Sir Timothy Creasey
