= Peter Ashmore =

English naval officer and courtier

Vice-Admiral Sir Peter Ashmore KCB KCVO DSC
- Rear Admiral Ashmore in March 1968.
- Born: 4 February 1921
- Died: 31 July 2002 (aged 81)
- Military career
- Allegiance: United Kingdom
- Branch: Royal Navy
- Service years: 1938–1972
- Rank: Vice-Admiral
- Commands: Admiralty Interview Board
- Conflicts: World War II
- Awards: Knight Commander of the Order of the Bath; Knight Commander of the Royal Victorian Order; Distinguished Service Cross

Vice-Admiral Sir Peter William Beckwith Ashmore KCB KCVO DSC (4 February 1921 – 31 July 2002) was a Royal Navy officer. After retirement from the navy he became Master of the Household to the Sovereign.

== Early life ==
Ashmore was the son of Vice-Admiral Leslie Ashmore: he was educated at Yardley Court and the Royal Naval College, Dartmouth; he joined the Royal Navy in 1938.

== Naval career ==
On graduation from Dartmouth, Ashmore served in the Second World War in the destroyer HMS Kipling in which he commanded the ship's guns during an operation to rescue survivors from two other British ships off Crete in May 1941. He was awarded the Distinguished Service Cross and mentioned in despatches in 1942. After the War he became Deputy Director of the Royal Navy Staff College at Greenwich in 1957, Captain (Frigates) of the Dartmouth Training Squadron in 1960 and a member of the Plans Division at the Admiralty in 1963. He was promoted to rear admiral on 7 July 1966, and went on to be Flag Officer, Admiralty Interview Board in 1966, Chief of Staff of the Western Fleet and to NATO Commander-in-Chief Eastern Atlantic in 1967 and Chief of the Allied Staff at Headquarters Allied Naval Forces Southern Europe in 1970 before he retired in 1972.

Ashmore was appointed a temporary Equerry to the King from 1946 to 1948, and an Extra Equerry to the Queen in 1952.

Ashmore was appointed a Member (4th class) of the Royal Victorian Order (MVO) in the 1947 Birthday Honours, a Companion of the Order of the Bath (CB) in the 1968 New Year Honours, promoted to Knight Commander of the Order of the Bath (KCB) in the 1972 New Year Honours, and to Knight Commander of the Royal Victorian Order (KCVO) in the 1980 Birthday Honours.

In retirement Ashmore was Master of the Household to the Sovereign from 1973 to 1986. His elder brother was Admiral Sir Edward Ashmore who became Admiral of the Fleet and Chief of the Defence Staff.

Court offices
Preceded by Sir Geoffrey Hardy-Roberts	Master of the Household; 1973–1986	Succeeded by Sir Paul Greening
