= Patrick Cordingley =

British Army general (born 1944)

Major General Patrick Cordingley DSO OBE FRGS
- Born: 6 October 1944 (age 82)
- Military career
- Allegiance: United Kingdom
- Branch: British Army
- Service years: 1965–2000
- Rank: Major General
- Commands: 2nd Division; Eastern District; 7th Armoured Brigade
- Conflicts: Gulf War
- Awards: Distinguished Service Order; Officer of the Order of the British Empire

Major General Patrick Anthony John Cordingley, DSO, OBE, FRGS (born 6 October 1944) is a retired British Army officer who commanded the 2nd Division from 1995 to 1996.

== Early life and education ==
Cordingley was born on 6 October 1944. He was educated at Sherborne School, an all-boys public school (i.e. independent boarding school). His father was Major-General John Cordingley, the son of Air Vice-Marshal Sir John Cordingley.

== Military career ==
Cordingley trained at the Royal Military Academy Sandhurst (Intake 35), where he was Senior Under-Officer of Waterloo Company. He was commissioned into 5th Royal Inniskilling Dragoon Guards in June 1965. He was given command of the 7th Armoured Brigade (Desert Rats) in 1988 and, in 1991, led the brigade during the Gulf War. He became General Officer Commanding Eastern District in 1992, General Officer Commanding 2nd Division in 1995 and Senior British Loan Services Officer to Oman in 1996, before he retired in 2000.

== Later life ==
In 1996 Cordingley published a book detailing his leading the troops into Iraq titled In The Eye of the Storm: Commanding 7th Armoured Brigade in the Gulf War, which rose to the top of the non-fictional bestseller lists. He was opposed to the Iraq War and has frequently spoken out against it citing his concern that many thousands of civilians would die unnecessarily. Cordingley has also spoken out against Britain renewing its Trident nuclear deterrent.

Cordingley was appointed an Officer of the Order of the British Empire in the 2017 Birthday Honours for services to the National Memorial Arboretum.

Military offices
Preceded by Michael Walker	General Officer Commanding Eastern District; 1992–1995	Command disbanded
New office Division reformed (Post last held by Michael Walker)	General Officer Commanding 2nd Division; 1995–1996	Succeeded by Dair Farrar-Hockley
