= David Tabor (British Army officer) =

British army officer

Major-General David Tabor CB MC
- Born: 5 October 1922; Ashby-de-la-Zouch, Leicestershire, England
- Died: 18 May 2004 (aged 81)
- Military career
- Allegiance: United Kingdom
- Branch: British Army
- Service years: 1942–1977
- Rank: Major-General
- Service number: 237402
- Unit: Royal Horse Guards
- Commands: Royal Horse Guards; Berlin Infantry Brigade; Eastern District
- Conflicts: Second World War
- Awards: Companion of the Order of the Bath; Military Cross

Major-General David John St Maur Tabor CB MC (5 October 1922 – 18 May 2004) was a British Army officer.

== Military career ==
Educated at Eton College and the Royal Military College, Sandhurst, Tabor was commissioned into the Royal Horse Guards in 1942 and saw action in North-West Europe during the Second World War. He became commanding officer of the Royal Horse Guards and in that role was deployed to Cyprus. He went on to be commander of the Berlin Infantry Brigade in 1967, British Military Attaché in Washington, D.C. in 1969 and a member of the directing staff at the Royal College of Defence Studies in 1971. After that he became British Defence Attaché in Paris in 1972 and then General Officer Commanding Eastern District in 1975 before retiring in 1977.

He was made Companion of the Order of the Bath (CB) in the 1977 New Year Honours List.

He married Pamela Roxane Nivison, daughter of John Nivison, 2nd Baron Glendyne, in 1955; they had two sons. After the death of his first wife, he married Marguerite Arkwright (née Verdon) in 1989. She died in 2020.

Military offices
Preceded by Peter Hudson	GOC Eastern District; 1975−1977	Succeeded by Andrew Watson
