= Eastern District (British Army) =

- Active: 1967–1995
- Country: United Kingdom
- Branch: British Army
- Type: District Command
- Garrison/HQ: Colchester Garrison (1972–1992); Imphal Barracks (1992–1992)

Eastern District was a district command of the British Army from 1967 and 1995.

== History ==
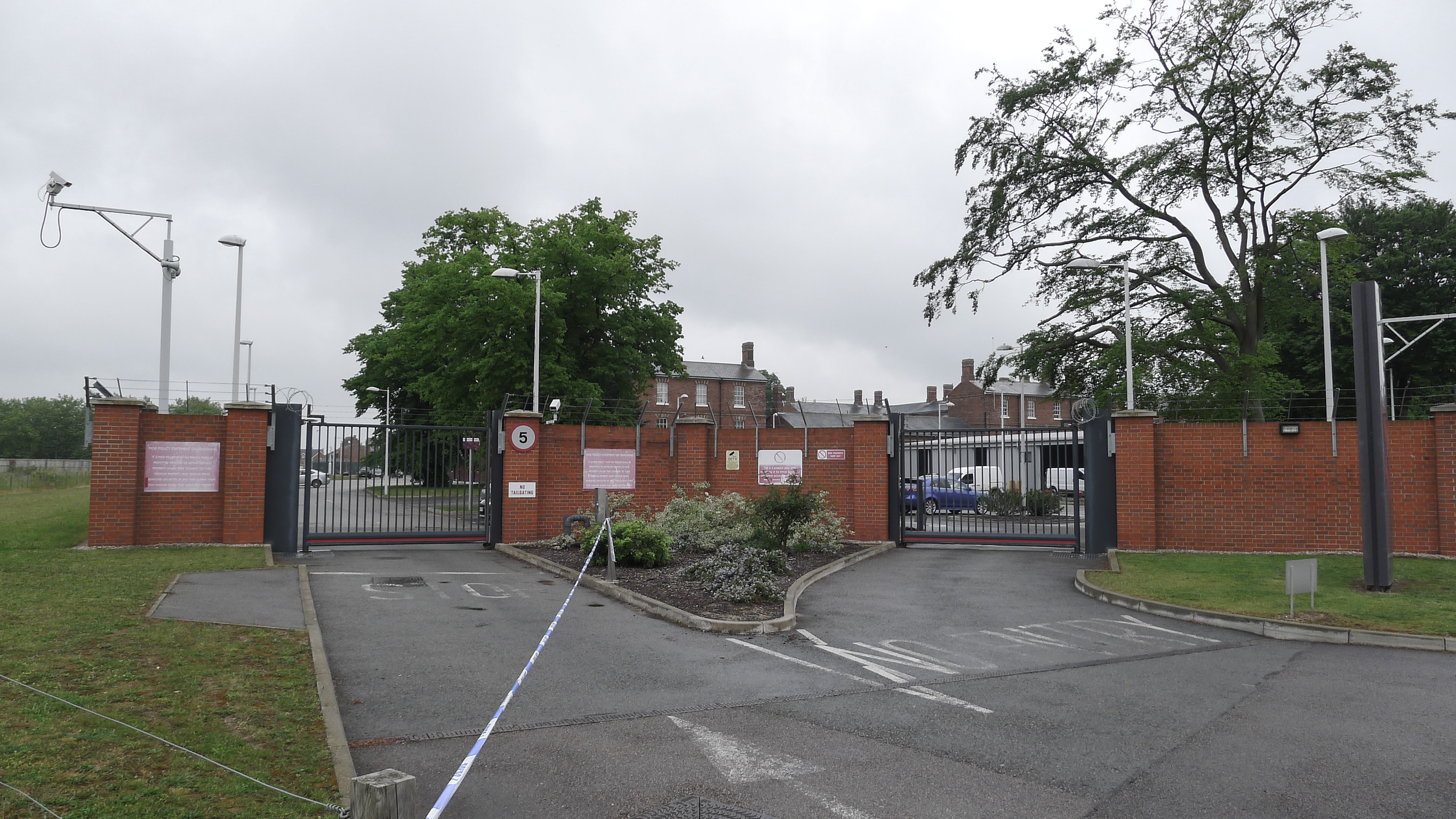
Colchester Garrison, command headquarters 1972-1992

The district was formed from 54th (East Anglian) Infantry Division as part of the Territorial Army Volunteer Reserve in 1967. It had its headquarters at Colchester Garrison and was placed under the command of HQ UK Land Forces in 1972. The district merged with North East District to form an enlarged Eastern District at Imphal Barracks in 1992. The enlarged district was disbanded on the formation of HQ Land Command in 1995.

== Commanders ==
General officers commanding included:

- 1967–1969 Major-General Fergus Ling
- 1969–1971 Major-General Jack Dye
- 1971–1973 Major-General David Scott-Barrett
- 1973–1975 Major-General Peter Hudson
- 1975–1977 Major-General David Tabor
- 1977–1980 Major-General Andrew Watson
- 1980–1982 Major-General Richard Gerrard-Wright
- 1982–1984 Major-General John MacMillan
- 1984–1987 Major-General Charles Ramsay
- 1987–1989 Major-General Peter Graham
- 1989–1992 Major-General William Evans
- 1992 Major-General Michael Walker
- 1992–1995 Major-General Patrick Cordingley
