= Andrew Miller (Royal Navy officer) =

Rear-Admiral Andrew Miller
- Born: 12 December 1926
- Died: 1 July 1986 (aged 59)
- Military career
- Allegiance: United Kingdom
- Branch: Royal Navy
- Service years: 1944-1986
- Rank: Rear-Admiral
- Commands: ML3513; HMS Asheldham; HMS Grafton; HMS Scorpion; HMS Nubian
- Conflicts: World War II

Rear-Admiral Andrew John 'Jock' Miller (12 December 1926 – 1 July 1986) was a senior Royal Navy officer.

== Education ==
Miller was educated at Craigflower Preparatory School near Dunfermline, Fife and the Royal Naval College, Dartmouth.

== Naval career ==
Miller was appointed midshipman in 1944, captain in 1965 and Rear-Admiral in 1972.

During his career Miller commanded ML3513, HMS Asheldham (M2604), HMS Grafton (F51), HMS Scorpion (D64) and HMS Nubian (F131).

Miller was director of public relations for the Royal Navy from 1970-71. He was also Flag Officer, Second Flotilla from 1972-1973.

From 1977-1981 he served as the London and south east regional director of the Missions to Seaman charity. In 1981 he was appointed assistant general secretary (administration).
