= Fergus Ling =

British Army general (1914–1995)

Major-General Fergus Ling CB CBE DSO DL
- Born: 1914
- Died: 7 May 1995 (aged 80–81)
- Military career
- Allegiance: United Kingdom
- Branch: British Army
- Rank: Major-General
- Commands: 2/5th Bn, Queen's Royal Regiment (West Surrey); 5th Bn, Queen's Royal Regiment (West Surrey); 148th Infantry Brigade; 54th (East Anglian) Division/District; Eastern District
- Conflicts: Second World War
- Awards: Companion of the Order of the Bath; Commander of the Order of the British Empire; Distinguished Service Order

Major-General Fergus Alan Humphrey Ling, CB, CBE, DSO, DL (1914 – 7 May 1995) was a British Army officer.

== Military career ==
Educated at Stowe School and the Royal Military College, Sandhurst, Ling was commissioned into the Queen's Royal Regiment (West Surrey) in December 1934. He commanded the 2/5th Battalion, Queen's Royal Regiment (West Surrey) at the crossing of the River Garigliano and the battles of the Gothic Line in 1944. After the war, he became commanding officer of the 5th Battalion, Queen's Royal Regiment (West Surrey) in 1954, commander of 148th Infantry Brigade in December 1958 and Deputy Adjutant General of the British Army of the Rhine in December 1961. He went on to be General Officer Commanding 54th (East Anglian) Division/District of the Territorial Army in May 1965 and GOC Eastern District in 1967 before he retired in February 1969.

He was honorary colonel of the Queen's Regiment from 1973 to 1977.

In retirement he managed a successful appeal on behalf of the National Trust to raise funds to acquire the Island of Lundy from the Harman family.

== Family ==
In 1940, he married Sheelah Sarel; they had two sons and three daughters.

Military offices
Preceded by Richard Fyffe	GOC 54th (East Anglian) Division/District; 1965–1967	Succeeded by Command disbanded
New title	GOC Eastern District; 1967–1969	Succeeded by Jack Dye
