= Peter Graham (British Army officer) =

British Army general (1937–2024)

Lieutenant General Sir Peter Graham KCB CBE
- Born: 14 March 1937; London, England
- Died: 30 December 2024 (aged 87)
- Military career
- Allegiance: United Kingdom
- Branch: British Army
- Service years: 1956–1993
- Rank: Lieutenant General
- Service number: 451249
- Commands: 1st Battalion, Gordon Highlanders; Ulster Defence Regiment; Eastern District; RMA Sandhurst; General Officer Commanding Scotland
- Conflicts: Indonesia–Malaysia confrontation Operation Banner
- Awards: Knight Commander of the Order of the Bath; Commander of the Order of the British Empire

Lieutenant General Sir Peter Walter Graham KCB CBE (14 March 1937 – 30 December 2024) was a British army lieutenant general who was General Officer Commanding Scotland from 1991 to 1993.

== Military career ==
Graham was born in London on 14 March 1937. He was brought up in Fyvie in Aberdeenshire, and educated at St Paul's School in London and the Royal Military Academy, Sandhurst, Graham was commissioned into the Gordon Highlanders in 1956. He went on to be adjutant of the 1st battalion of his regiment in 1963 and was mentioned in despatches for his services in Borneo during the Indonesia–Malaysia confrontation in 1966. In 1974 he was appointed military assistant to General Sir Cecil Blacker, the Adjutant-General to the Forces.

Graham was made commanding officer of 1st Battalion, the Gordon Highlanders 1976 and chief of staff at 3rd Armoured Division in 1978. He went on to command the Ulster Defence Regiment in 1982 and was mentioned in despatches for his services in Northern Ireland in 1984. He became deputy military secretary at the Ministry of Defence in 1985 and General Officer Commanding Eastern District in 1987. In 1989 he was made Commandant of the Royal Military Academy Sandhurst. He became General Officer Commanding Scotland and Governor of Edinburgh Castle in 1991 and retired in 1993.

Graham was appointed a Member of the Order of the British Empire (MBE) in 1972 for distinguished service in Northern Ireland from Aug-Oct 1971, promoted to Officer of the Order (OBE) in 1978 for distinguished service in Northern Ireland from Feb-Apr of that year, further promoted to Commander of the Order (CBE) in the 1981 Birthday Honours, and knighted as Knight Commander of the Order of the Bath (KCB) in the 1991 Birthday Honours.

== Personal life and death ==
In 1963 he married Alison Mary Morren; they went on to have three sons. His brother is the former Lord Mayor of London, Sir Alexander Graham.

Graham was a supporter of a 'No' vote for the 2014 Scottish independence referendum and was listed as a speaker at the launch of the Better Together Buchan campaign group on 9 November 2013.

Graham died on 30 December 2024, at the age of 87.

Military offices
Preceded by Charles Ramsay	General Officer Commanding Eastern District; 1987–1989	Succeeded by William Evans
Preceded by Simon Cooper	Commandant of the Royal Military Academy Sandhurst; 1989–1991	Succeeded by Timothy Toyne Sewell
Preceded by Sir John MacMillan	GOC Scotland; 1991–1993	Succeeded by Michael Scott
