= Geoffrey Hardy-Roberts =

British soldier, politician and courtier (1907–1997)

Sir Geoffrey Hardy-Roberts
- Born: Geoffrey Paul Francis Jacques Roberts; 16 May 1907; London, England
- Died: 9 April 1997 (aged 89); Chichester, West Sussex, England
- Military career
- Allegiance: United Kingdom
- Branch: British Army
- Service years: 1926–1937; 1939–1945
- Rank: Brigadier
- Service number: 36765
- Unit: 9th Queen's Royal Lancers
- Conflicts: World War II
- Awards: Knight Commander of the Royal Victorian Order; Companion of the Order of the Bath; Commander of the Order of the British Empire; Mentioned in dispatches

Brigadier Sir Geoffrey Paul Hardy-Roberts KCVO CB CBE JP DL (16 May 1907 – 9 April 1997) was a British Army officer, Conservative politician and courtier, who served as Master of the Household between 1967 and 1973. He was High Sheriff of Sussex in 1965.

== Biography ==
Hardy-Roberts was born Geoffrey Paul Francis Jacques Roberts, the son of Alfred Walter Roberts and Marguerite, the daughter of Paul Nathan who had changed his name to Hardy. Geoffrey changed his surname by deed poll in 1937. He was educated at Eton College and the Royal Military College, Sandhurst, before commissioning into the 9th Queen's Royal Lancers in 1926. He initially served in India and was promoted to lieutenant in 1929. In 1933, he returned to the United Kingdom and served as Adjutant of his regiment between 1933 and 1935. He retired from the army with the rank of captain in 1937. On 28 April 1938, he was elected unopposed to the London County Council to fill a casual vacancy. He sat as a Municipal Reform Party councillor representing Lewisham West and held the seat until elections were resumed after the Second World War in 1946.

Hardy-Roberts' commission was reactivated in 1939 following the outbreak of war. He was promoted to lieutenant colonel in 1941 and that same year was invested as an Officer of the Order of the British Empire. He saw active service in the Western Desert Campaign and the Italian Campaign, before working as Chief of Staff to General Sir Miles Dempsey between 1943 and 1945. In 1944, Hardy-Roberts was appointed a CBE and mentioned in dispatches while serving in the North-West Europe Campaign of 1944–1945, and he was made a Companion of the Order of the Bath in 1945. He also made an Officer of the Legion of Merit by the United States government.

In the 1945 United Kingdom general election, Hardy Roberts stood as the Conservative candidate in Wimbledon, but narrowly lost the usually safe Conservative seat to Arthur Palmer of the Labour Party. Between 1946 and 1967 he worked as Secretary-Superintendent of Middlesex Hospital and was a Justice of the Peace in Sussex. He resigned his commission from the Regular Reserve of Army Officers in 1958 and was granted the rank of brigadier. In 1964, he served as Deputy Lieutenant for West Sussex and he became High Sheriff of Sussex in 1965.

In 1967, he was appointed Master of the Household of Elizabeth II, serving in the position until 1973. From 1967 to his death in 1997, Hardy-Roberts was also an Extra Equerry to the Queen. He was created a Knight Commander of the Royal Victorian Order in 1972.

== Honour ==
=== Foreign honour ===
- Malaysia : Honorary Commander of the Order of Loyalty to the Crown of Malaysia (P.S.M.) (1972)

Court offices
| Preceded by Sir Mark Milbank, 4th Baronet | Master of the Household; 1967–1973 | Succeeded by Sir Peter Ashmore |
