= Master of the Household =

Operational manager of UK Royal Households

- Royal Coat of Arms

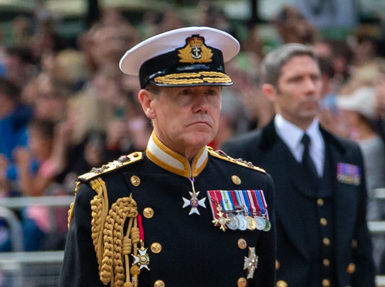
- Incumbent; Vice Admiral Sir Anthony Johnstone-Burt since 2013
- Royal Households of the United Kingdom
- Reports to: The Monarch
- Seat: Buckingham Palace
- Appointer: The Monarch
- Term length: At His Majesty's pleasure
- Formation: 1805
- First holder: Richard Browne
- Deputy: Deputy Master of the Household

The Master of the Household is the operational head (see Chief operating officer) of the "below stairs" elements of the Royal Households of the United Kingdom. The role has charge of the domestic staff, from the Royal Kitchens, the pages and footmen, to the porters, housekeeper and their staff. The appointment has its origin in the household reforms of 1539-40; it is under the (now purely nominal) supervision of the Lord Steward.

Since 2004 the Office of the Prince of Wales has included a Master of the Household.

== History ==
Historically, the Master of the Household was a member of the Lord Steward's Department, and sat on the Board of Green Cloth. Among other duties, he presided at the daily dinners of the suite in waiting on the sovereign. The office is not named in the Black Book of Edward IV or in the Statutes of Henry VIII but is entered as Master of the Household and one of the clerks of the Green Cloth in the Household Book of Queen Elizabeth.

Initially there were four Masters of the Household, and they were working officers; but by the late 17th century there was a single Master and the post had become a sinecure. In 1782, when a number of household sinecures were abolished, the Master of the Household was given renewed responsibility for the management of the Lord Steward's Department; and under further reforms overseen by Prince Albert he was given charge of the entire domestic establishment.

In the 1920s, as part of a reconfiguration of the King's Household, the Lord Steward's Department was renamed the Master of the Household's Department. The Master of the Household chaired the Board of Green Cloth up until the time of its abolition in the early 21st century.

== List of Masters of the Household ==
- Richard Browne 1603–1604
- Sir Robert Vernon bef. 1608 – c.1625
- Charles Glemham c. 1625 – 1625
- Roger Palmer 1626–1632
- In abeyance 1632–1645
- George Lisle c. 1645 – 1648
- In abeyance? 1648–1660
- Sir Herbert Price, 1st Baronet 1660–1665 and 1666–1678
- Honourable Henry Bulkeley 1678–1688
- Sir Thomas Felton, 4th Baronet 1689–1708
- Edmund Dunch 1708–1712
- Sir William Pole, 4th Baronet 1712–1714
- Edmund Dunch 1714–1719
- Sir Conyers Darcy 1720–1730
- Sir George Treby 1730–1741
- Sir John Harris 1741–1767
- Henry Thynne 1768–1771
- Sir Francis Henry Drake, 5th Baronet 1771–1794
- Sir Henry Strachey, 1st Baronet 1794–1810
- Sir William Kenrick 1810–1812
- Samuel Hulse 1812–1827
- Sir Frederick Beilby Watson 1827–1838
- Sir Charles Murray 1838–1844
- Captain Henry Meynell 1844–1845
- Major-General Sir George Bowles 1845–1851
- General Sir Thomas Biddulph 1851–1866
- Major-General Sir John Cowell 1866–1894
- Lieutenant-Colonel Lord Edward Pelham-Clinton, 1894–1901
- Horace Farquhar, 1st Viscount Farquhar 1901–1907 (later Earl Farquhar)
- Lieutenant Colonel Sir Charles Arthur Andrew Frederick 1907–1912
- Lieutenant-Colonel Sir Derek Keppel 1913–1936
- Brigadier Sir Smith Child, 2nd Baronet 1936–1941
- Lieutenant-Colonel Sir Piers Legh 1941–1953
- Major Sir Mark Milbank, 4th Baronet 1954–1967
- Brigadier Sir Geoffrey Hardy-Roberts 1967–1973
- Vice-Admiral Sir Peter Ashmore 1973–1986
- Rear-Admiral Sir Paul Greening 1986–1992
- Major-General Sir Simon Cooper 1992–2000
- Vice-Admiral Sir Anthony Blackburn 2000–2004
- Air Marshal Sir David Walker 2005–2013
- Vice-Admiral Sir Tony Johnstone-Burt 2013–

== List of Deputy Masters of the Household ==
- Lieutenant-Colonel Sir Charles Arthur Andrew Frederick 1901–1907
- Harry Lloyd-Verney, 1907–1911
- Sir Derek Keppel 1911–1912
- Captain Lord Arthur Hamilton 1913–1914
- Sir Harry Stonor} 1918–1921
- Captain Lord Claud Nigel Hamilton 1922–1924
- Brigadier-General Sir Smith Child, 2nd Baronet 1929–1936
- Lieutenant-Colonel Ririd Myddelton, 1937–1939
- Group Captain Peter Townsend, 1950–52
- Major Sir Mark Milbank, 4th Baronet, 1952–1954
- Lieutenant-Colonel Patrick Terence William Span Plunket, 7th Baron Plunket 1954–1975
- Lieutenant-Colonel Sir Blair Stewart-Wilson 1976–1994
- Lieutenant-Colonel Sir Guy Acland, 1994–1999
- Lieutenant-Colonel Sir Anthony Charles Richards, 1999–2023

== Sources ==
- Hoey, Brian (1992). All The Queen's Men: Inside The Royal Household. London: HarperCollins. ISBN 0-246-13851-3.
- Master of the Household 1660–1837
