= 5th Royal Inniskilling Dragoon Guards =

- Regimental Badge.
- Active: 1922–1993
- Country: United Kingdom
- Branch: British Army
- Type: Armoured
- Role: Cavalry
- Size: Regiment
- Part of: Royal Armoured Corps
- Garrison/HQ: Chester
- Mottos: Vestigia nulla retrorsum (Latin: We do not retreat)
- March: Quick: Fare Ye well Enniskillen; Slow: The Soldier's Chorus from Gounod's Faust
- Anniversaries: Oates Sunday; Balaklava Day; Waterloo Day; Salamanca Day

The 5th Royal Inniskilling Dragoon Guards was a cavalry regiment of the British Army formed in 1922 by the amalgamation of the 5th Dragoon Guards (Princess Charlotte of Wales's) and the 6th (Inniskilling) Dragoons. It served in the Second World War and the Korean War. In August 1992, as a consequence of the Options for Change defence cuts, the regiment was amalgamated with the 4th/7th Royal Dragoon Guards to form the Royal Dragoon Guards.

== History ==
=== Formation ===
The regiment was formed in 1922, as the 5th/6th Dragoons, at Cairo, Egypt by the amalgamation of the 5th Dragoon Guards (Princess Charlotte of Wales's) and the 6th (Inniskilling) Dragoons.

In 1923, the regiment was deployed to Risalpur, India. In 1927, the regiment discarded the "6th" and inserted Inniskilling into its title, thereby becoming the 5th Inniskilling Dragoon Guards. In the following year, the regiment moved to the UK for the first time, as the 5th Dragoon Guards.

In June 1935 King George V celebrated his silver jubilee. This opportunity was taken of granting royal status to four regiments, principally in recognition of their service in the previous war:

On the occasion of His Majesty's Birthday and in commemoration of the completion of the twenty-fifth year of his reign, the King has been graciously pleased... to approve that the following regiments shall in future enjoy the distinction "Royal" and shall henceforth be designated:—

- 5th Royal Inniskilling Dragoon Guards
- The Buffs (Royal East Kent Regiment)
- The Royal Northumberland Fusiliers
- The Royal Norfolk Regiment

In 1938, as part of the preparation for the Second World War, the regiment was mechanised; in the following year, it joined the newly formed Royal Armoured Corps (RAC).

=== Second World War ===
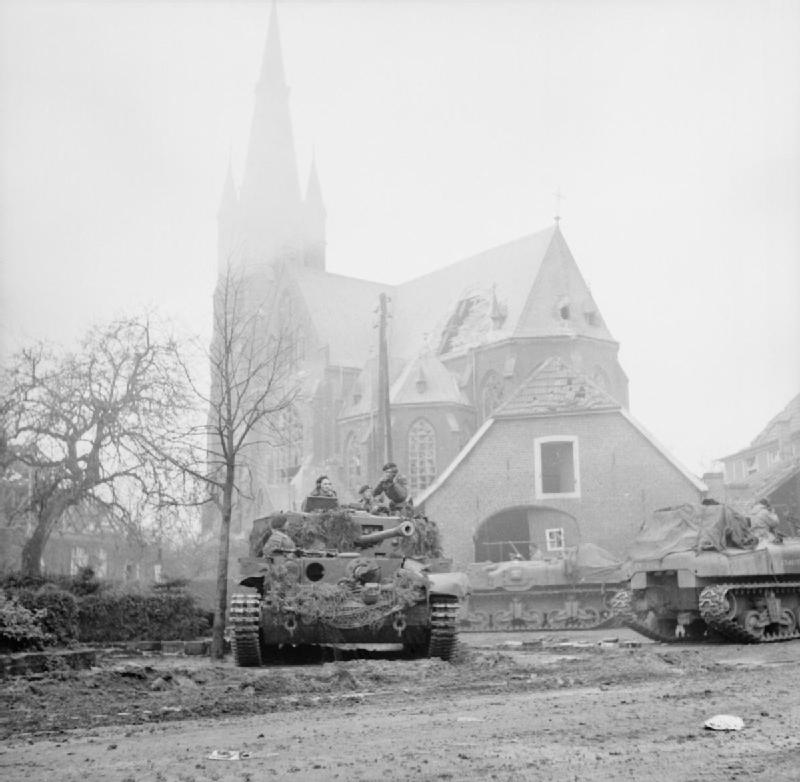
A Cromwell tank of 5th Royal Inniskilling Dragoon Guards supporting infantry in Weseke, 29 March 1945.

On 3 September 1939, two days after the Wehrmacht had invaded Poland, the United Kingdom, France and their Allies declared war on Nazi Germany. Equipped with Vickers Mk.VI, the regiment, commanded initially by Lieutenant Colonel John Anstice, acted as the reconnaissance regiment of the 4th Infantry Division of the British Expeditionary Force (BEF) that was deployed to the continent shortly after the war broke out. On 10 May 1940, the German Army launched their invasion of the Low Countries, thus ending what was known as the Phoney War. The German invasion was swift and successful; the Allied forces in Belgium, which included the regiment, having to retreat to the Scheldt River. Fierce fighting continued, the BEF continuing to withdraw further until the order was given for them to withdraw to Dunkirk in northern France. The regiment was successfully evacuated from Dunkirk in June 1940.

In December 1940, cadres drawn from the regiment and the 4th/7th Royal Dragoon Guards were used to form a new regiment, the 22nd Dragoons, which was disbanded in December 1945.

The 5th Dragoon Guards remained in the United Kingdom until late July 1944, when it landed in Normandy, over a month after the initial D-Day landings of 6 June, and joined the 22nd Armoured Brigade, 7th Armoured Division (the famed 'Desert Rats'). Heavy fighting was still raging in Normandy and the regiment took part in actions in Mont Pincon in early August and, subsequently, at Saint-Pierre-la-Vieille. The regiment saw further service in Northern France, including helping in the capture of Lisieux on 23 August, and later crossing the Risle, advancing rapidly to the Seine.

The Inniskillings began their advance on Belgium on 31 August-the 7th Armoured Division's objective was the city of Ghent-and crossed the Somme, where the regiment's predecessor regiments had fought during World War I, and Authie rivers. The division's remarkable advance on the Franco-Belgian border could not be maintained as the enormous amounts of fuel consumed had depleted available supplies. Instead, a smaller force, including the Innsikillings, was employed in the effort to capture Ghent; the Inniskillings and the 11th Hussars entered the city on 5 September. The 7th Armoured Division remained in Belgium to take part in operations against the remnants of the German forces and, thus, did not take part in Operation Market Garden. The regiment subsequently took part in heavy fighting around the Maas river during Operation Pheasant which began in late October.

The regiment saw action during Operation Blackcock, the plan to clear the west bank of the Roer of Germans, which commenced on 16 January 1945. It subsequently took part in the crossing of the Rhine, which began on 25 March, with the objective of heading eastward, straight for the city of Hamburg. The regiment was now firmly inside German territory, encountering fierce resistance from the Germans. The regiment took part in the capture of a number of towns during the rapid advance into Germany. In April, the regiment took part in the efforts to capture Ibbenburen, seeing heavy fighting against the fierce defenders. The regiment saw further heavy fighting elsewhere before it, with the rest of its brigade, headed south for Bremen, where they helped capture Wildeshausen. Later, the Inniskillings took part in the successful attack on Soltau before the advance on Harburg, a suburb of Hamburg, resumed. Towards the end of April, the Germans negotiated the surrender of Hamburg, a city that had been devastated by the Allied bombing campaigns; the 7th Armoured Division entered the city on 3 May.

=== Post-War ===
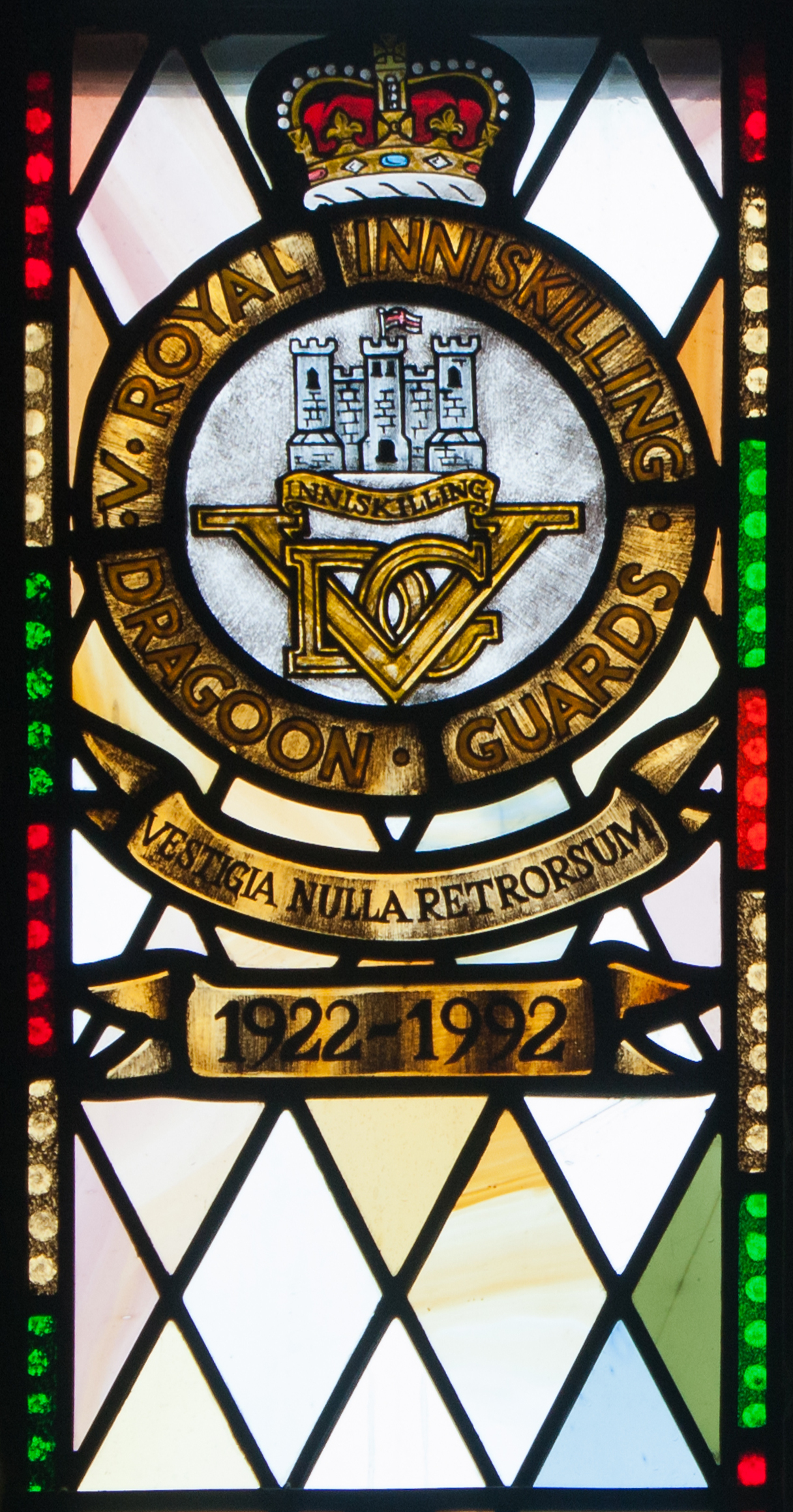
Memorial window at St Macartin's Cathedral, Enniskillen

The regiment was sent to York Barracks in Munster to serve as part of 22nd Armoured Brigade in 1946 and then moved to Barker Barracks in Paderborn in December 1948. The regiment returned to the UK in August 1951, from where the regiment was sent, a few months later, to Korea to take part in the Korean War—a war that had been raging ever since North Korea had launched a surprise attack against South Korea—as part of the 1st Commonwealth Division. The Chinese launched a massive attack on 'The Hook', a tactically important position held by the British, on 18 November 1952, commencing the second battle for 'The Hook'. The Black Watch, having stoutly defended their positions, were forced back by the overwhelming Chinese attack. Subsequently, the British launched a counter-attack that supported the Black Watch as they began the methodical effort to dislodge the Chinese from 'The Hook'; B Squadron of the regiment, which was armed with the powerful Centurion main battle tank, was part of this attack. Fighting raged on into the early hours of 19 November but, as dawn broke, the Chinese retreated, unable to consolidate their position on 'The Hook'. The regiment left Korea the following month, arriving in the Suez Canal Zone just prior to its handover to the Egyptians.

In February 1957, the regiment moved to Athlone Barracks in Sennelager but returned to the UK in November 1962 from where it deployed troops to Libya in Autumn 1963 and to Aden and Hong Kong in December 1964. A Squadron deployed to Cyprus in January 1966 to act in the reconnaissance role for the United Nations (UN) forces, which were there to prevent conflict from breaking out between the opposing Greek and Turkish Cypriots. The regiment returned home in December 1967 but then moved to Harewood Barracks in Herford in March 1969 and to York Barracks in Münster in June 1970. In October 1973, the regiment joined the UN forces in Cyprus, returning to its base in December 1974.

The regiment moved to Imphal Barracks in Osnabrück in December 1976, from which it deployed to Northern Ireland on a four-month tour in April 1981. The regiment returned to the UK in November 1984 and then moved to Barker Barracks in Paderborn in November 1986. The regiment deployed on another four-month tour in Northern Ireland in September 1989 and again in January 1992.

In August 1992, as a consequence of the Options for Change defence cuts, the regiment was amalgamated with the 4th/7th Royal Dragoon Guards to form the Royal Dragoon Guards.

== Regimental museum ==
The regimental museum, along with that of the Royal Inniskilling Fusiliers, is based in Enniskillen Castle. A further display can be seen in the Cheshire Military Museum at Chester Castle.

== Uniform ==
At the time of amalgamation, care was taken to ensure that the new regiment's uniform retained a balance of features from both former regiments. Thus in full dress, the red and white plume of the 5th Dragoon Guards was worn on the (silver) helmet of the 6th Dragoons, the helmet badge of the 5th was worn, but the collar badge of the 6th. Yellow facings (collar and cuffs) were retained from the 6th Dragoons, but in order not to lose the distinctive green facings of the 5th Dragoon Guards, it was proposed that green breeches/overalls be worn. (Green breeches had formerly been worn in the eighteenth century, when the regiment was known as 'the Green Horse'.) The proposal was accepted, and a new tradition established. After mechanisation, green trousers began to be worn with various orders of dress (a custom still maintained by the successor regiment, the Royal Dragoon Guards).

== Battle honours ==
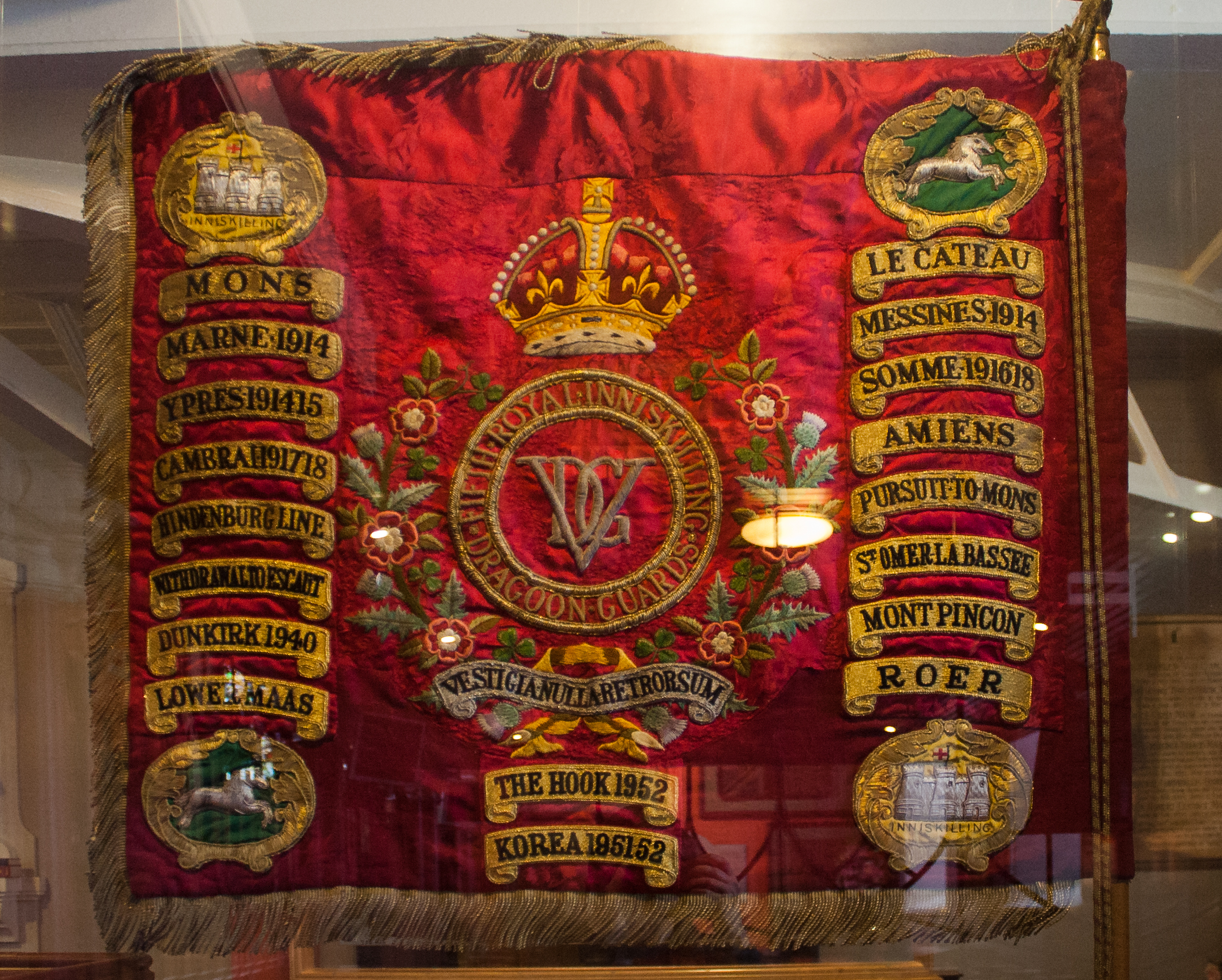
Regimental colours in St. Macartin's Cathedral displaying the honors from Mons to Korea

The regiment's battle honours were as follows:

- Early Wars: (Battle Honours for predecessor regiments): Blenheim, Ramillies, Oudenarde, Malplaquet, Dettingen, Warburg, Beaumont, Willems, Salamanca, Vittoria, Toulouse, Peninsula, Waterloo, Balaklava, Sevastopol, Defence of Ladysmith, South Africa 1899–1902
- First World War (Battle Honours for predecessor regiments):
  - Western Front: Mons, Le Cateau, Retreat from Mons, Marne 1914, Aisne 1914, La Bassée, Messines 1914, Armentières 1914, Ypres 1914 '15, Frezenberg, Bellewaarde, Somme 1916'18, Flers-Courcelette, Morval, Arras 1917, Scarpe 1917, Cambrai 1917 and 1918, St Quentin, Rosières, Avre, Lys, Hazebrouk, Amiens, Hindenburg Line, St Quentin Canal, Beaurevoir, Pursuit to Mons, France and Flanders 1914–18
- Second World War:
  - North-West Europe: Withdrawal to Scheldt, St Omer-La Bassée, Dunkirk 1940, Mont Pincon, St Pierre La Vielle, Lisieux, Risele Crossing, Roer Triangle (Operation Blackcock), Ibbenburen, North-West Europe 1940 '44–45
- Korea: The Hook 1952, Korea 1951–52

== Commanding Officers ==
The Commanding Officers have been:

- 1960–1962: Lt.-Col. Harry C. Walker MC
- 1962–1965: Lt.-Col. Gavin S. Murray
- 1965–1967: Lt.-Col. Henry G. Woods
- 1967–1970: Lt.-Col. Guy L. Wathen
- 1970–1972: Lt.-Col. Charles E. Taylor
- 1972–1975: Lt.-Col. Richard C. Keightley
- 1975–1977: Lt.-Col. Patrick G. Brooking
- 1977–1980: Lt.-Col. Nicholas G. P. Ansell
- 1980–1982: Lt.-Col. William A. Evans
- 1982–1984: Lt.-Col. Water J. Courage
- 1984–1987: Lt.-Col. Patrick A. J. Cordingley
- 1987–1990: Lt.-Col. Brian R. Anderson
- 1990–1992: Lt.-Col. David W. Montgomery

== Colonels-in-Chief ==
The colonels-in-chief were as follows:

- 1922–1934: Field Marshal HM King Albert I of Belgium KG GCB GCStJ DFC
- 1937–1951: HM King Leopold III of Belgium KG GCVO
- 1985–1992: Commander HRH The Prince of Wales KG KT GCB AK QSO CD PC ADC

== Regimental Colonels ==
Colonels of the Regiment were:

5th/6th Dragoons then 5th Inniskilling Dragoon Guards (1927)

- 1922–1928 (6th Dragoons): Maj-Gen. Sir Michael Frederic Rimington, KGB, CVO (ex 6th Dragoons)
- 1922–1937 (5th Dragoon Guards): Lt-Gen. Sir George Tom Molesworth Bridges, KCB, KCMG, DSO (ex 5th Dragoon Guards)

5th Royal Inniskilling Dragoon Guards (1935)

- 1937–1947: Maj-Gen. Roger Evans, CB, MC
- 1947–1957: Gen. Sir Charles Frederic Keightley, GCB, GBE, DSO
- 1957–1962: Col. Sir Michael Picton Ansell, CBE, DSO
- 1962–1967: Gen. Sir John D'Arcy Anderson, GBE, KCB, DSO, DL
- 1967–1972: Brig. Arthur Carr, OBE
- 1972–1981: Gen. Sir Cecil Blacker, GCB, OBE, MC
- 1981–1986: Brig. William Francis Allan Findlay, OBE
- 1986–1991: Maj-Gen. Richard Charles Keightley, CB
- 1991–1992: Maj-Gen. Patrick Guy Brooking, CB, MBE (to Royal Dragoon Guards)
- 1992: Regiment amalgamated with 4th/7th Royal Dragoon Guards to form The Royal Dragoon Guards

== Alliances ==
- Canada 10th Brant Dragoons (1922–1936) - Canada
- Canada 2nd/10th Dragoons (1936–1946) - Canada
- Canada The British Columbia Dragoons (1960–1992) - Canada
- Australia 9th Light Horse (The Flinders Light Horse) (1927–1943) - Australia
- Australia 3rd/9th Light Horse (South Australian Mounted Rifles) (1951–1992) - Australia
- New Zealand 6th (Manawatu) Mounted Rifles (1922–1944) - New Zealand

Yeomanry

- United Kingdom The Cheshire Yeomanry (Earl of Chester's)
- United Kingdom North Irish Horse
