= Richard Gerrard-Wright =

British Army general

Major-General Richard Gerrard-Wright CB CBE
- Born: 9 May 1930
- Died: 12 May 2012 (aged 82)
- Military career
- Allegiance: United Kingdom
- Branch: British Army
- Service years: 1949–1985
- Rank: Major-General
- Commands: 39th Infantry Brigade; Eastern District
- Conflicts: Northern Ireland
- Awards: Companion of the Order of the Bath; Commander of the Order of the British Empire

Major-General Richard Eustace John Gerrard-Wright CB CBE (9 May 1930 – 12 May 2012) was a British Army officer.

== Military career ==
Educated at Christ's Hospital and the Royal Military Academy Sandhurst, Tabor was commissioned into the Royal Lincolnshire Regiment in 1949. He was deployed to the Suez Canal Zone and to Kenya and then saw action during the Malayan Emergency. He became commanding officer of a battalion of the Royal Anglian Regiment and in that role was deployed to Northern Ireland during the Troubles. He went on to be commander of 39th Infantry Brigade in 1975, Chief of Staff of I (British) Corps in 1978 and General Officer Commanding Eastern District in 1980. His last appointment was as Director Territorial Army and Cadets at the Ministry of Defence in 1982 before retiring in 1985.

He married Susan Young in 1960; they had two sons and two daughters.

Military offices
Preceded by Andrew Watson	General Officer Commanding Eastern District; 1980–1982	Succeeded by John MacMillan
