= Craigflower Preparatory School =

Location
- Craigflower House; Torryburn, Fife, KY12 8AY; Scotland

Information
- Type: Preparatory school
- Established: 1923
- Founder: F.G. Wailes
- Closed: 1979
- Gender: Boys
- Age: 8 to 13

Craigflower Preparatory School was a private preparatory school for boys at Torryburn near Dunfermline, Scotland.

== History ==
Craigflower Preparatory School was established at Craigflower House, Torryburn, near Dunfermline, Fife in 1923. (Craigflower House was built in 1860 by David Bryce who designed Fettes College and the Bank of Scotland headquarters on The Mound in Edinburgh.)

The school's founder, F.G. Wailes, was educated at Malvern College and Emmanuel College, Cambridge and was Joint Headmaster at St Ninian's School, Moffat from 1913 to 1923. As of July 1946 there were reportedly 55 boys in attendance at the school. He was succeeded by John Stephens who ran the school until 1968 assisted by his wife Veronica, when Mark Reynolds succeeded.

Craigflower School closed in December 1979 with two masters and most of the boys transferring to Cargilfield Preparatory School in Edinburgh. The Cargilfield school library contains two silver plaques from Craigflower, the Webster plaque and the Stewart shield for head of school. The Craigflower School war memorial was moved into Torryburn Parish Church following the renovation of Craigflower House into 12 separate properties in 2000.

== Notable alumni ==
- Major General Robert Maxwell Johnstone (1914–1990), senior British Army officer.
- Hugh Malcolm (1917–1942), Royal Air Force officer, recipient of the Victoria Cross.
- Rear-Admiral Andrew 'Jock' Miller (1926-1986), senior Royal Navy officer.
- David Hannay, Baron Hannay of Chiswick (born 1935), diplomat.
- Michael Fallon (born 1952), Conservative politician and Member of Parliament for Sevenoaks.
- Anthony Reid (born 1957), auto racing driver.*
- Danny Kinahan (born 1958), Ulster Unionist Party Politician and MP for South Antrim
- Andrew Marr (born 1959), broadcaster and journalist.
- Torquhil Campbell, 13th Duke of Argyll (born 1968), landowner and Chief of Clan Campbell.
