= John MacMillan (British Army officer) =

British Army officer and Olympic rower

Lieutenant General Sir John MacMillan KCB CBE
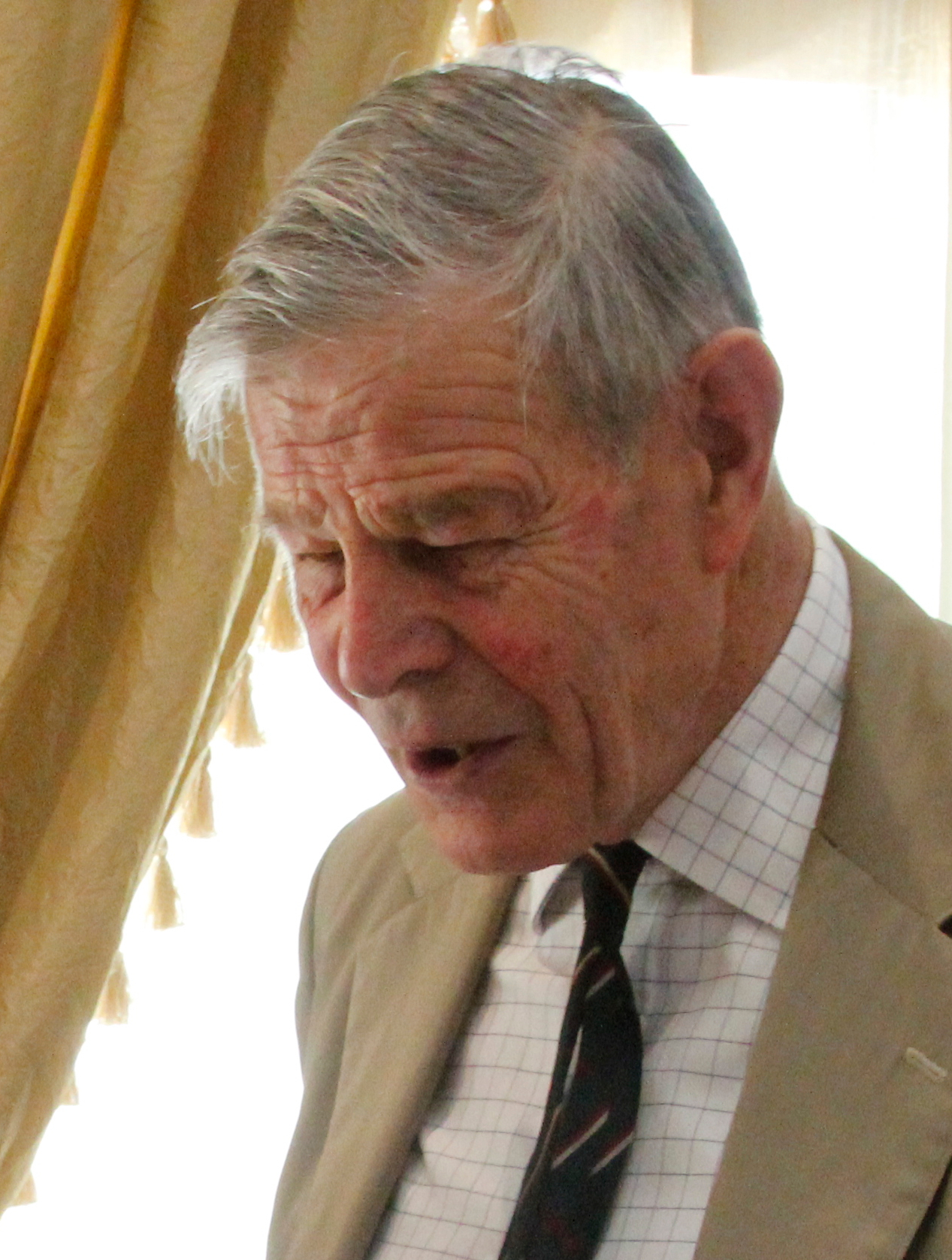
- MacMillan in 2012
- Born: 8 February 1932 (age 94); St George Hanover Square, London
- Relatives: Sir Gordon MacMillan (father)
- Military career
- Allegiance: United Kingdom
- Branch: British Army
- Service years: 1953–1991
- Rank: Lieutenant General
- Service number: 431870
- Units: Argyll and Sutherland Highlanders; Gordon Highlanders
- Commands: General Officer Commanding Scotland; Eastern District; 39th Infantry Brigade; 1st Battalion, Gordon Highlanders
- Conflicts: Operation Banner
- Awards: Knight Commander of the Order of the Bath; Commander of the Order of the British Empire
- Sports career
- Sport: Rowing
- Club: Cambridge University Boat Club

Lieutenant General Sir John Richard Alexander MacMillan, KCB, CBE (born 8 February 1932) is a Scottish officer in the British Army who served as General Officer Commanding Scotland. While he was at university, he was a rower and represented Great Britain at the 1952 Summer Olympics.

== Early life and education ==
MacMillan was born in London on 8 February 1932, the son of Captain (later General Sir) Gordon MacMillan and Marion Blakiston-Houston. He was educated at Eton College and Trinity College, Cambridge.

== Rowing ==
While at Trinity College, MacMillan was a member of the Cambridge University Boat Club. He competed in the men's double sculls event at the 1952 Summer Olympics, with Peter Brandt as his rowing partner. They were eliminated in the first repechage.

MacMillan competed in The Boat Race 1953, a side-by-side rowing race in eights between crews from the universities of Oxford and Cambridge along the River Thames. Cambridge won by eight lengths.

== Military career ==
MacMillan was commissioned into the Argyll and Sutherland Highlanders in 1953. He was appointed commanding officer of 1st Battalion the Gordon Highlanders in 1971, and commander of the 39th Infantry Brigade, a unit permanently stationed in Northern Ireland, in 1977. He was given the colonelcy of the Gordon Highlanders from 1978 to 1986.

MacMillan became General Officer Commanding Eastern District in 1982, Assistant Chief of the General Staff in 1984 and General Officer Commanding Scotland and Governor of Edinburgh Castle in 1988. He retired in 1991.

In 1995, MacMillan became Chairman of the Erskine Hospital in Renfrewshire.

=== Honours ===
On 19 February 1973, MacMillan was appointed an Officer of the Order of the British Empire (OBE) for "distinguished services in Northern Ireland during the period 1 May to 31 July 1972"; during that time, Bloody Friday and Operation Motorman happened. On 12 December 1978, MacMillan was promoted to Commander of the Order of the British Empire (CBE) "in recognition of distinguished service in Northern Ireland during the period 1 May to 31 July 1978.

In the 1988 Birthday Honours, MacMillan was appointed a Knight Commander of the Order of the Bath (KCB).

== Family ==
In 1964, MacMillan married Belinda Webb, daughter of Lieutenant Colonel Richard Henry Lumley Webb. They have one son and two daughters.

Military offices
Preceded by Richard Gerrard-Wright	General Officer Commanding Eastern District; 1982–1984	Succeeded by Charles Ramsay
Preceded by Laurence New	Assistant Chief of the General Staff; 1984–1987	Succeeded by Charles Guthrie
Preceded by Sir Norman Arthur	GOC Scotland; 1988–1991	Succeeded by Sir Peter Graham
