= Attorney General Cooper =

Attorney General Cooper may refer to:

- Charles Merian Cooper (1856–1923), Attorney General of Florida
- Henry E. Cooper (1857–1929), Attorney General of the Kingdom of Hawaii
- Pope Alexander Cooper (1848–1923), Attorney-General of Queensland
- Robert E. Cooper Jr. (born 1957), Attorney General of Tennessee
- Roy Cooper (born 1957), Attorney General of North Carolina

== See also ==
- General Cooper (disambiguation)
