= Matthew T. Cooper =

United States Marine Corps general

- Born: March 8, 1934 (age 92); Lexington, North Carolina, U.S.
- Military career
- Allegiance: United States
- Branch: United States Marine Corps
- Service years: 1958–1980s
- Rank: Lieutenant general
- Commands: Deputy Chief of Staff for Manpower and Reserve Affairs; 1st Marine Division, 4th Marine Division

Matthew T. Cooper (born March 8, 1934) is a retired lieutenant general in the United States Marine Corps who served as Deputy Chief of Staff for Manpower and Reserve Affairs. He was born in Lexington, North Carolina and graduated from the United States Naval Academy in 1958.
