= Richard C. Johnston =

US Air Force General

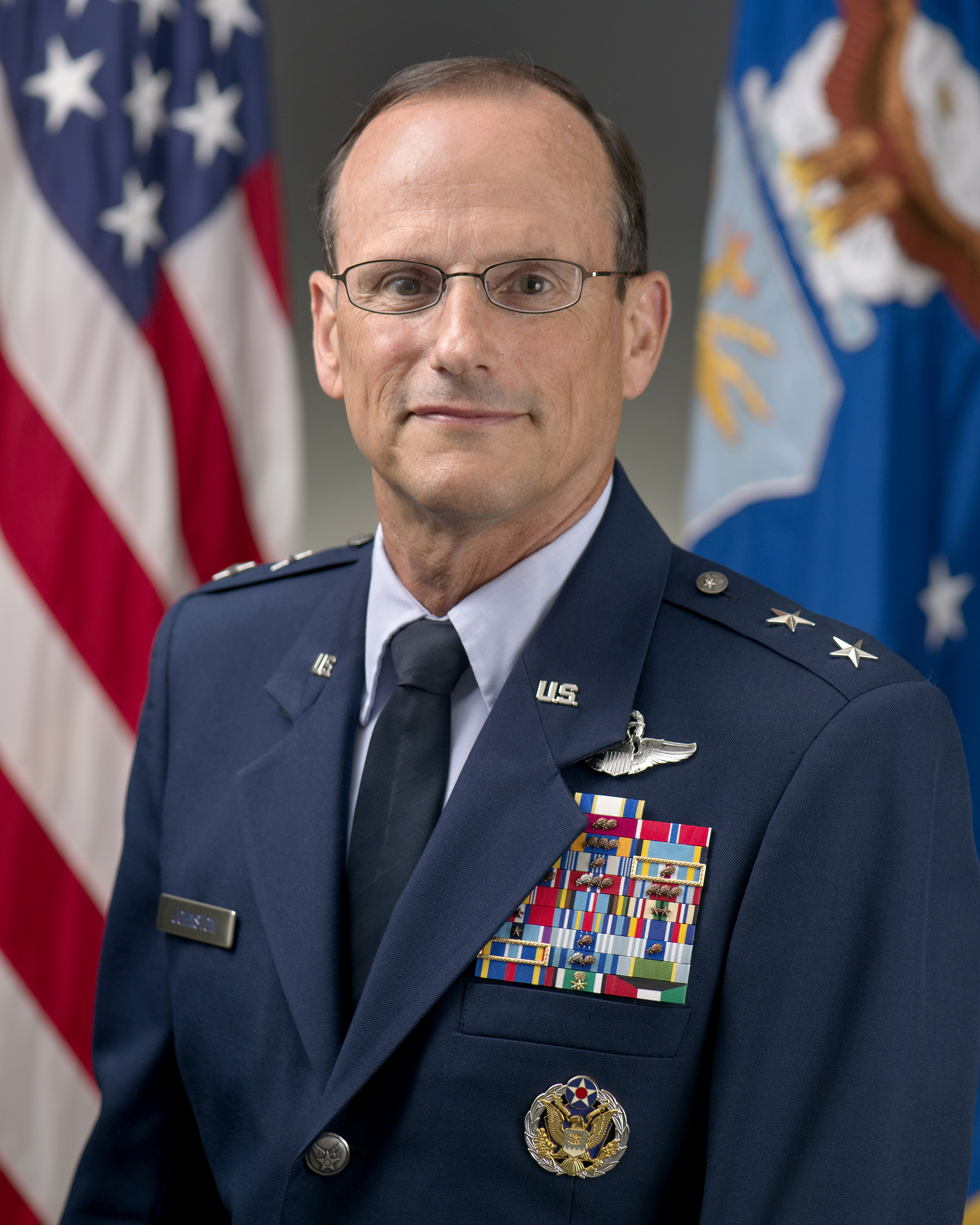
- Born: 1957 (age 68–69)
- Military career
- Allegiance: United States
- Branch: United States Air Force
- Service years: 1981–2014
- Rank: Major General
- Commands: Assistant Deputy Under Secretary of the Air Force, International Affairs; 86th Airlift Wing; 320th Air Expeditionary Wing
- Conflicts: Gulf War; Iraq War
- Awards: Defense Distinguished Service Medal; Defense Superior Service Medal (2); Legion of Merit (3)

Richard C. Johnston is a retired major general in the United States Air Force.

== Career ==
Johnston was commissioned an officer in 1982. He was given command of the 317th Airlift Group and the 320th Air Expeditionary Wing during the Iraq War before being assigned to the United States Transportation Command in 2004. Later he was given command of the 86th Airlift Wing. In 2009 he was assigned to The Pentagon.

Awards he has received include the Defense Superior Service Medal, the Legion of Merit with two oak leaf clusters, the Bronze Star Medal, the Meritorious Service Medal with four oak leaf clusters, the Air Medal with three oak leaf clusters, the Aerial Achievement Medal, the Air Force Commendation Medal, the Outstanding Unit Award with valor device and two silver oak leaf clusters, the Combat Readiness Medal with four oak leaf clusters, the Southwest Asia Service Medal with two service stars, the Kosovo Campaign Medal, and the Humanitarian Service Medal.

== Education ==
- B.A., Criminal Justice – University of Wisconsin-Eau Claire
- Graduate – Squadron Officer School
- M.S., Operational Research and Business Management – University of Arkansas
- Graduate – United States Army Command and General Staff College
- Graduate – Air War College
- M.S., National Security Strategy – National War College
- Graduate, Black Sea Security Program – John F. Kennedy School of Government at Harvard University
- Graduate, Program for Senior Managers in Government – John F. Kennedy School of Government at Harvard University

== Assignments ==
1. October 1981 - October 1982, student, undergraduate pilot training, Vance AFB, Okla.
2. October 1982 - February 1983, C-130 pilot training, Little Rock AFB, Ark.
3. February 1983 - June 1985, aircraft commander, 54th Weather Reconnaissance Squadron, Andersen AFB, Guam
4. June 1985 - June 1991, instructor pilot and evaluator pilot, 50th Tactical Airlift Squadron; assistant chief, Standardization and Evaluation, 314th Tactical Airlift Group; and executive officer, 314th Tactical Airlift Wing, Little Rock AFB, Ark.
5. June 1991 - June 1993, Chief of Tactical Airlift Assignments and Chief of Rated Officer Assignments, Directorate of Personnel, Headquarters Military Airlift Command, Scott AFB, Ill.
6. June 1993 - June 1994, student, Army Command and General Staff College, Fort Leavenworth, Kan.
7. June 1994 - June 1997, Chief of Mobility Forces Programming Branch, and later executive officer for the Director of Forces and then Director of Joint Matters, Deputy Chief of Staff for Air and Space Operations, Headquarters U.S. Air Force, Washington, D.C.
8. June 1997 - February 2000, operations officer then Commander, 2nd Air Refueling Squadron, McGuire AFB, N.J.
9. February 2000 - August 2001, Chief, Senior Officer Management Division, Directorate of Personnel, Headquarters Air Mobility Command, Scott AFB, Ill.
10. August 2001 - June 2002, student, National War College, Fort Lesley J. McNair, Washington, D.C.
11. July 2002 - March 2004, Commander, 317th Airlift Group, Dyess AFB, Texas (November 2002 - June 2003, Commander, 320th Air Expeditionary Wing, Southwest Asia)
12. March 2004 - August 2004, Deputy Director of Operations, U.S. Transportation Command, Scott AFB, Ill.
13. August 2004 - September 2005, executive officer to the Commander, USTRANSCOM, and to the Commander, Air Mobility Command, Scott AFB, Ill.
14. September 2005 - March 2006, executive officer to the Commander, USTRANSCOM, Scott AFB, Ill.
15. April 2006 - December 2007, Commander, 86th Airlift Wing, Ramstein AB, and Commander, Kaiserslautern Military Community, Germany
16. December 2007 - September 2009, Director, Plans, Programs and Analyses, Headquarters U.S. Air Forces in Europe, Ramstein AB, Germany
17. September 2009 - September 2011, Director, Air Force Strategic Planning, Deputy Chief of Staff for Strategic Plans and Programs, Headquarters U.S. Air Force, Washington, D.C.
18. September 2011 – September 2014, Assistant Deputy Under Secretary of the Air Force, International Affairs, Office of the Under Secretary of the Air Force, Washington, D.C.

== Summary of Joint Assignment ==
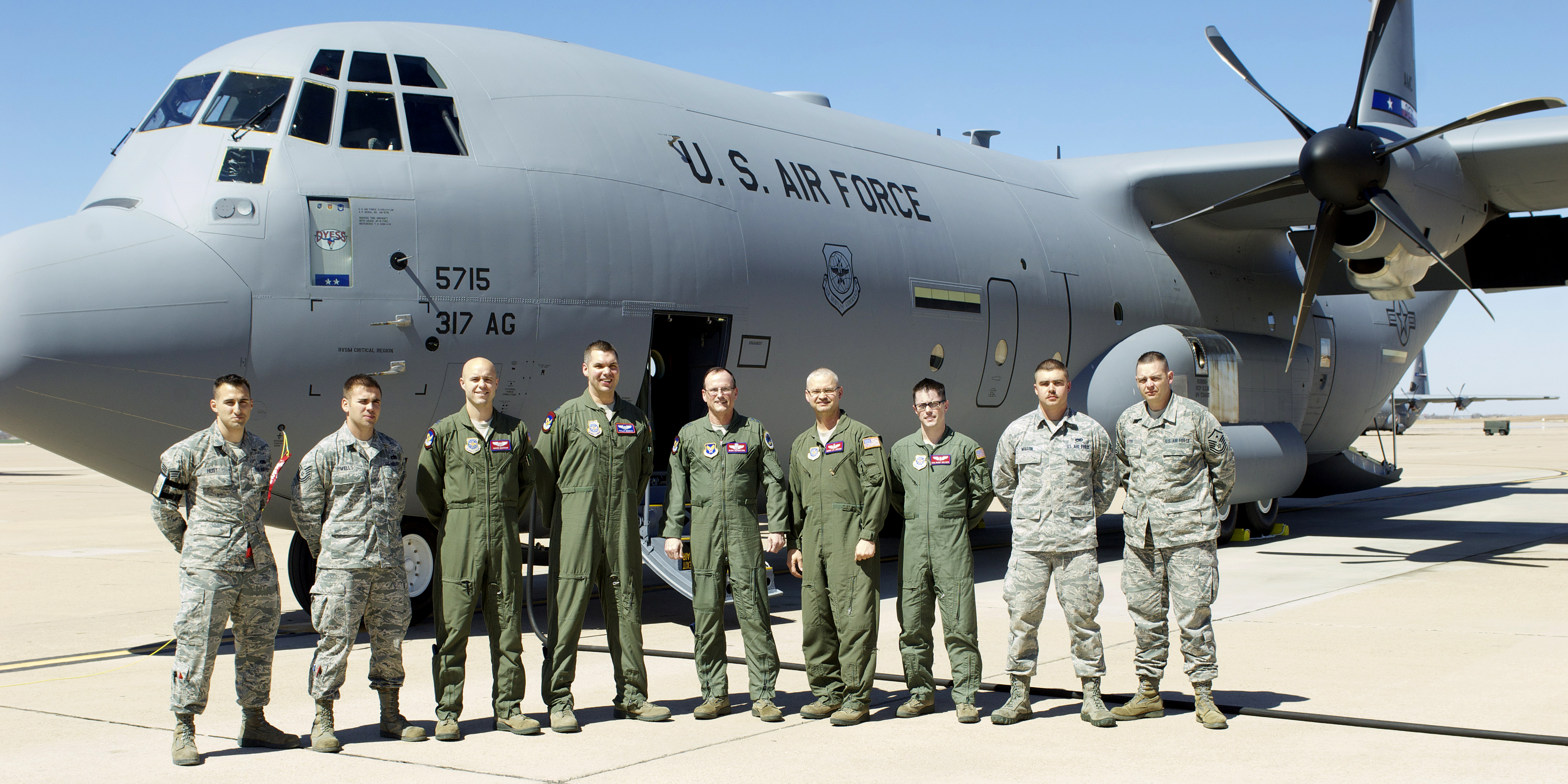
Major General Richard C. Johnston, standing middle, with Members of the 317th Airlift Group Dyess Air Force Base, Texas.

1. March 2004 - August 2004, Deputy Director of Operations, USTRANSCOM, Scott AFB, Ill., as a colonel
2. August 2004 - September 2005, executive officer to the Commander, USTRANSCOM, and to the Commander, Air Mobility Command, Scott AFB, Ill., as a colonel
3. September 2005 - March 2006, executive officer to the Commander, USTRANSCOM, Scott AFB, Ill., as a colonel

== Flight Information ==
Rating: Command pilot

Flight hours: More than 4,300 hours

Aircraft flown: C-130E/H/J, C-21A, C-37A, C-40B, KC-10A, and WC-130E/H

== Effective dates of promotion ==
Rank	Date
Second lieutenant	October 6, 1981
First lieutenant	October 16, 1983
Captain	October 16, 1985
Major	February 1, 1994
Lieutenant colonel	January 1, 1998
Colonel	July 1, 2002
Brigadier general	November 2, 2007
Major general	November 17, 2010
