= Andrew Watson (British Army officer) =

British Army officer (1927–2022)

Major-General Andrew Watson CB
- Born: 9 April 1927; Meerut, British India
- Died: 12 July 2022 (aged 95)
- Military career
- Allegiance: United Kingdom
- Branch: British Army
- Service years: 1946–1982
- Rank: Major-General
- Commands: 1st Bn Black Watch; 19 Airportable Brigade; Eastern District
- Conflicts: Northern Ireland
- Awards: Companion of the Order of the Bath

Major-General Andrew Linton Watson CB (9 April 1927 – 12 July 2022) was a British Army officer.

== Life and career ==
Educated at Wellington College, Watson was commissioned into the Black Watch in 1946. He became commanding officer of the 1st Bn Black Watch in 1969 and in that role was deployed to Northern Ireland during the Troubles. He went on to be commander of 19 Airportable Brigade in 1972, British Military Attaché in Washington, D.C. in 1975 and General officer Commanding Eastern District in 1977. His last appointment was as Chief of Staff, Allied Forces Northern Europe in 1980 before retiring in 1982.

Watson died on 12 July 2022, at the age of 95.

Military offices
Preceded by David Tabor	General Officer Commanding Eastern District; 1977–1980	Succeeded by Richard Gerrard-Wright
