= Robert Maxwell Johnstone =

British Army general

Major-General Robert Maxwell Johnstone MBE MC CStJ FRCPE
- Born: 9 March 1914; Edinburgh, Scotland
- Died: 11 March 1990 (aged 76)
- Military career
- Allegiance: United Kingdom
- Branch: British Army
- Service years: 1938–1969
- Rank: Major-General
- Service number: 56428
- Unit: Royal Army Medical Corps
- Conflicts: World War II; Korean War; Malayan Emergency
- Awards: Military Cross; Member of the Order of the British Empire; Commander of the Order of St John(CStJ)

Major-General Robert Maxwell Johnstone MBE MC CStJ FRCPE (9 March 1914 – 11 March 1990) was a senior British Army officer.

== Early life ==
Johnstone was born in Edinburgh and educated at the Edinburgh Academy, Craigflower Preparatory School, Fettes College, Christ's College, Cambridge and the University of Edinburgh. He graduated M.A., M.B. B.Chir. from Cambridge and M.B. Ch.B. from Edinburgh in 1938. From 1938 to 1939 he was employed as a resident house physician and surgeon at the Royal Infirmary, Edinburgh. He attained MRCPE in 1940, FRCPE in 1944 and MD in 1954.

== Army ==
Throughout World War II he served with the Royal Army Medical Corps. Between 1938 and 1941 he served with 129 Field Regiment and became company commander of the 167 Field Regiment from 1941 to 1943. In 1943 he was based at the Staff College, Haifa. Johnstone was awarded the Military Cross (MC) in August 1943, for his services at Enfidaville, Tunisia, in April/May 1943. From 1945 to 1946 he was commanding officer of 3 Field Ambulance.

Johnstone was medical advisor to HQ East Africa Command from 1950 to 1951. He served with the Commonwealth forces, Korea between 1954 and 1955. On 22 October 1954 he was appointed a Member of the Order of the British Empire (MBE) in recognition of distinguished services in Malaya during the period 1 January to 30 June.

From 1955 to 1957 he was officer in charge of the medical division at the Cambridge Military Hospital, Aldershot Garrison, Hampshire. Between 1957 and 1959 he was based at Queen Alexandra Military Hospital (QAMH), Millbank, London.

In 1959 he became Professor of Medicine, University of Baghdad and honorary consultant physician to the Iraqi Army. From 1963 to 1965 he was commanding officer of British Military Hospital (BMH), Iserlohn, Germany, and from 1965 to 1967 he was consultant physician to HQ, Far East Land Forces (FARELF). Between 1967 and 1968 he was deputy director of medical services, Southern Command and Army Strategic Command from 1968 to 1969. In June 1969 he was appointed Commander of the Order of St John (CStJ).

Following his retirement from the Army in 1969 he served as assistant director (overseas) of the British Postgraduate Medical Federation from 1970 to 1976.
