= Michael Walker, Baron Walker of Aldringham =

Army officer (born 1944)

Field Marshal The Right Honourable The Lord Walker of Aldringham GCB CMG CBE DL
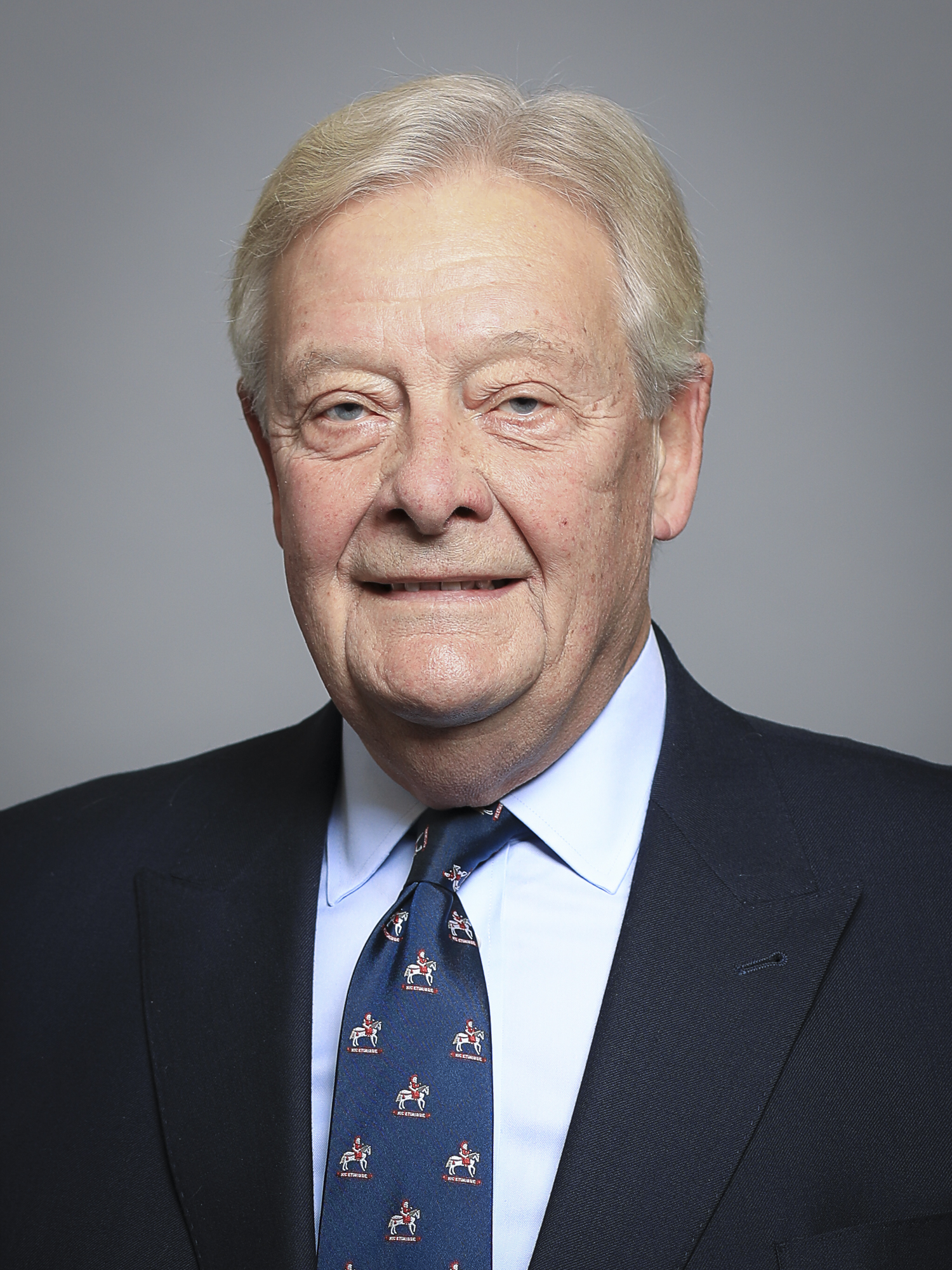
- Walker in 2020
- Born: 7 July 1944 (age 82); Salisbury, Southern Rhodesia (now Harare, Zimbabwe)
- Military career
- Allegiance: United Kingdom
- Branch: British Army
- Service years: 1966–2006
- Rank: Field Marshal
- Commands: Chief of the Defence Staff (2003–06); Chief of the General Staff (2000–03); Land Command (1997–00); Allied Rapid Reaction Corps (1994–97); Eastern District (1991–92); 2nd Infantry Division (1991–92); 20th Armoured Brigade (1987–89); 1st Battalion, Royal Anglian Regiment (1985–87)
- Conflicts: The Troubles; Gulf War
- Awards: Knight Grand Cross of the Order of the Bath; Companion of the Order of St Michael and St George; Commander of the Order of the British Empire; Mentioned in Despatches; Commander of the Legion of Merit (United States)

Member of the House of Lords
- Lord Temporal
- Life peerage 19 December 2006

Personal details
- Party: Crossbencher

Field Marshal Michael John Dawson Walker, Baron Walker of Aldringham, GCB, CMG, CBE, DL (born 7 July 1944) is a retired British Army officer. Commissioned in 1966, he served in Cyprus, Northern Ireland, and in a variety of staff posts in the United Kingdom until 1984. After being given command of a battalion, he was mentioned in despatches for his service during a second tour of duty in Northern Ireland, this time in Derry, and subsequently served a tour on Gibraltar. He was promoted to brigadier, unusually having never held the rank of colonel, and took command of 20th Armoured Brigade in Germany before becoming I Corps chief of staff.

As a major general, Walker was appointed General Officer Commanding, Eastern District, before becoming Assistant Chief of the Defence Staff at the Ministry of Defence. He took command of NATO's Allied Rapid Reaction Corps (ARRC), which deployed to the Balkans in 1995, Walker becoming the first officer to command the land component of the NATO-led Implementation Force. For his service with the multi-national forces in the Balkans, he was awarded the American Legion of Merit. After relinquishing command of the ARRC, Walker spent three years as Commander in Chief, Land Command, before being appointed Chief of the General Staff—the professional head of the British Army—in 2000. In 2003, he was promoted to Chief of the Defence Staff (CDS)—the professional head of all the British Armed Forces. While CDS, Walker attracted controversy during the modernisation of the armed forces, over allegations of prisoner abuse during the Iraq War, and over comments that the media coverage of Iraq may have endangered British troops.

Walker retired in 2006 and was subsequently appointed Governor of the Royal Hospital Chelsea, a post he held until 2011. In 2014, he was promoted to the rank of Field Marshal. He is married and has three children.

== Early and personal life ==
Born in Salisbury in the British colony of Southern Rhodesia (modern-day Zimbabwe) to William Hampden Dawson Walker, who was a Senior Assistant Commissioner in the British South Africa Police until 1958, and Dorothy Helena Walker (née Shiach), Walker was educated both in Southern Rhodesia and in Yorkshire, first at Milton School, Bulawayo, and then at Woodhouse Grove School, West Yorkshire. He spent 18 months teaching in a Preparatory School before joining the British Army. Walker married Victoria ("Tor", née Holme), in 1973 and the couple have three children—two sons and one daughter. He lists his interests as sailing, shooting, tennis, skiing and golf.

== Early military career ==
After attending the Royal Military Academy Sandhurst, Walker was commissioned into the Royal Anglian Regiment as a second lieutenant on 29 July 1966. He served as a platoon commander with the 1st Battalion and was promoted to lieutenant on 29 January 1968. In 1969 he was posted to Cyprus for a two-year tour, and served in Northern Ireland during The Troubles, before attending the Staff College, Camberley. He was promoted to captain on 29 July 1972.

After serving in a staff position at the Ministry of Defence (MoD), Walker was promoted to major at the end of 1976, and rejoined the 1st Battalion, to become a company commander, based in Tidworth, Wiltshire. In 1979, he took up another staff post at the MoD, after which he was promoted to lieutenant colonel in 1982. Until 1985, he served as Military Assistant to the Chief of the General Staff. He was appointed an Officer of the Order of the British Empire in the 1985 New Year Honours.

In command of the 1st Battalion from 1985 to 1987, Walker served another tour in Northern Ireland, this time in Derry, and later a tour on Gibraltar. He was mentioned in despatches in 1987 "in recognition of gallant and distinguished service" in Northern Ireland. Unusually, Walker was promoted directly to brigadier at the end of 1987, without having held the rank of colonel. He took command of the 20th Armoured Brigade, based in Germany, from 1987 to 1989, before holding the post of chief of staff, I Corps between 1989 and 1991.

== High command ==
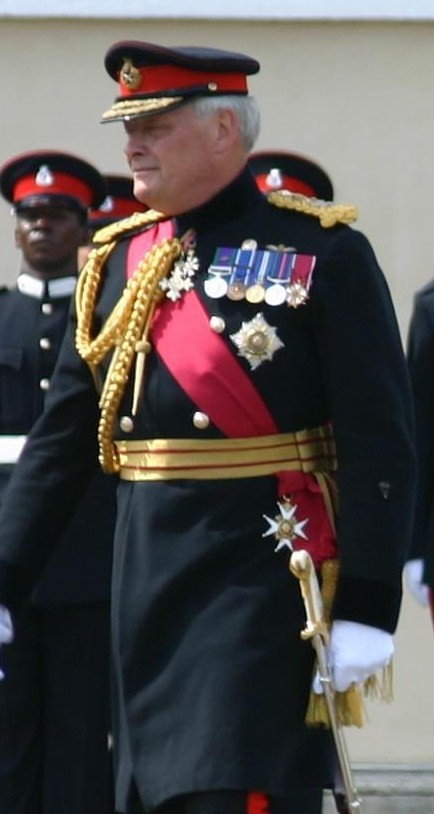
Walker in June 2005

Walker attained general officer status with promotion to acting major general in 1991, and took command of the North East District and 2nd Infantry Division. Having served in the Gulf War, he was promoted to Commander of the Order of the British Empire later in 1991. He was granted the substantive rank of major general on 2 December 1991, with seniority from 14 February 1991, going on to serve as General Officer Commanding of the Eastern District and then as Assistant Chief of the General Staff from 11 December 1992 to 3 October 1994.

On 8 December 1994, Walker was appointed commander of NATO's Allied Rapid Reaction Corps, which had its headquarters in Rheindahlen, Germany, and was promoted to acting lieutenant general. He was granted the substantive rank of lieutenant general on 15 March 1995, and knighted in the 1995 Queen's Birthday Honours when he was appointed a Knight Commander of the Order of the Bath. Under Walker's command, the Allied Rapid Reaction Corps deployed to the Balkans in December 1995. There, he became the first commander of the land component of the NATO-led Implementation Force (IFOR), until his return to the UK in November 1996.

His IFOR command in Bosnia was indirectly criticised by Richard Holbrooke for his refusal to use his authority to also perform nonmilitary implementation tasks, including arresting indicted war criminals:

Based on Shalikashvili's statement at White House meetings, Christopher and I had assumed that the IFOR commander would use his authority to do substantially more than he was obligated to do. The meeting with [Admiral Leighton] Smith shattered that hope. Smith and his British deputy, General Michael Walker, made clear that they intended to take a minimalist approach to all aspects of implementation other than force protection. Smith signalled this in his first extensive public statement to the Bosnian people, during a live call-in program on Pale Television – an odd choice for his first local media appearance.

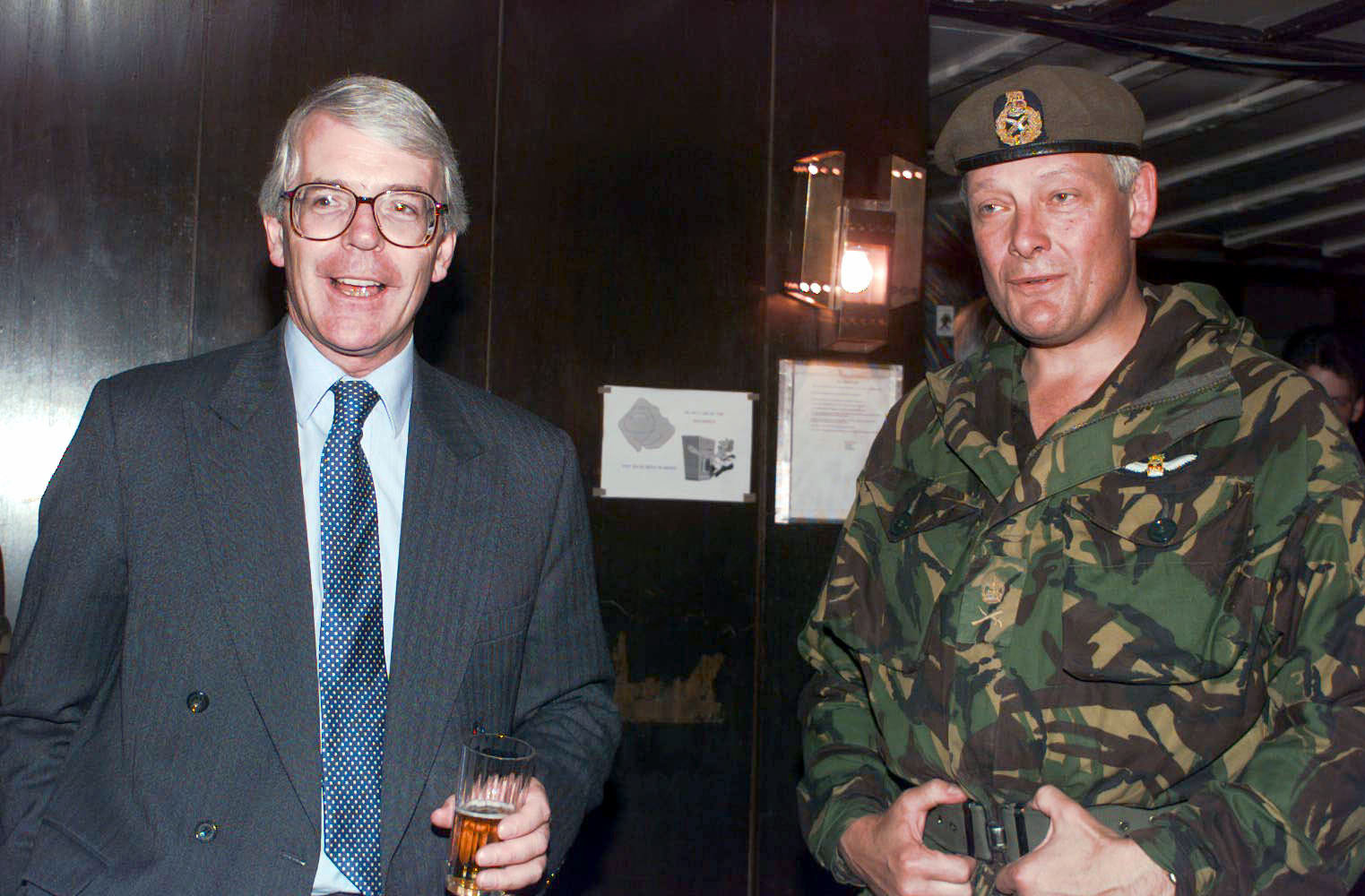
Walker with Prime Minister John Major at the Ilidza Compound in Sarajevo, Bosnia, during Operation Joint Endeavor

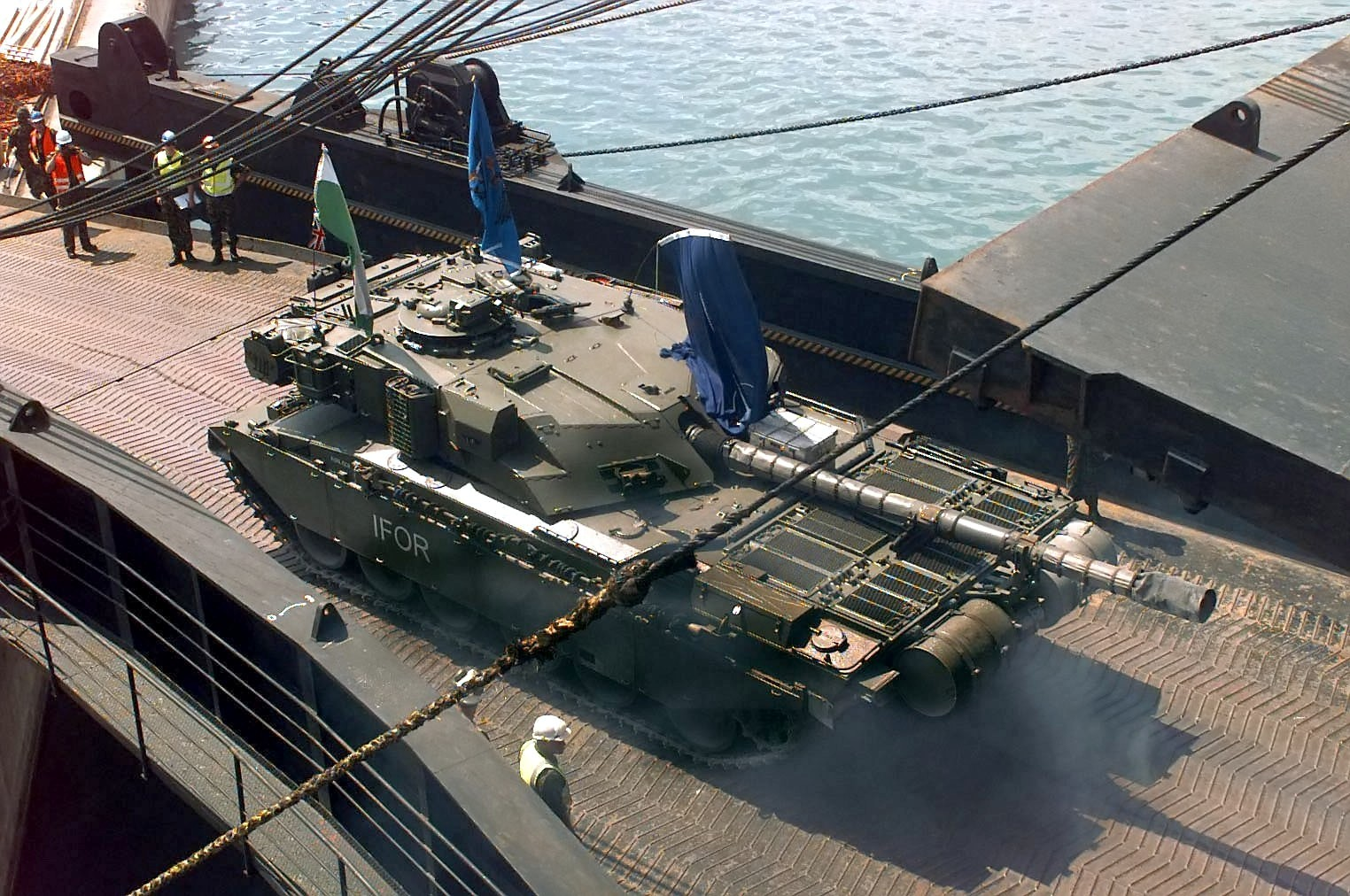
Walker served as commander of the land component of the NATO-led Implementation Force in Bosnia

He was appointed a Companion of the Order of St Michael and St George at the end of 1996.

Succeeded as COMARRC by Sir Mike Jackson, Walker was promoted to acting general and appointed Commander in Chief, Land Command on 27 January 1997. He was granted the substantive rank of general on 2 April 1997. In recognition of his service with IFOR between 1995 and 1996, Walker was awarded the American Legion of Merit (Degree of Commander), and granted unrestricted permission to wear the decoration, in May 1997. In September 1997, he was appointed Aide-de-Camp General (ADC Gen) to Queen Elizabeth II, succeeding General Sir Michael Rose, until he in turn was succeeded by General Sir Richard Dannatt. He was promoted to Knight Grand Cross of the Order of the Bath in the New Year Honours List at the end of 1999.

The flag of the Chief of the General Staff.

Having served just over three years as Commander-in-Chief, Walker was appointed Chief of the General Staff (CGS)—the professional head of the British Army—on 17 April 2000, taking over from General Sir Roger Wheeler. He remained CGS for three years, after which he was promoted to Chief of the Defence Staff (CDS)—the professional head of all the British Armed Forces—on 2 May 2003, succeeding Admiral Sir Michael Boyce (later Lord Boyce). As CDS, Walker criticised some of the media coverage of British deployments in Iraq. In particular, he claimed that attacks on the Black Watch were "enhanced" due to news reports on their location. He went on to say that "[as a result of the media coverage], there could well have been a response by those who wished us ill to go and meet us with something like a bomb". His comments were rejected by a spokesman for the National Union of Journalists, who retaliated "When generals turn around and start blaming reporters for their own mistakes, it is a sign they aren't doing their own jobs properly". However, the MoD explained that speculation in the press about the timing and movement of military units can put people in danger and editors were "urged to consider the difficulties reports could cause to troops on the ground." Also in 2004, Walker, along with General Sir Mike Jackson, then Chief of the General Staff, attracted controversy over reforms of the armed forces, which included the amalgamation of several army regiments to form larger regiments, leading to the loss of historic names.

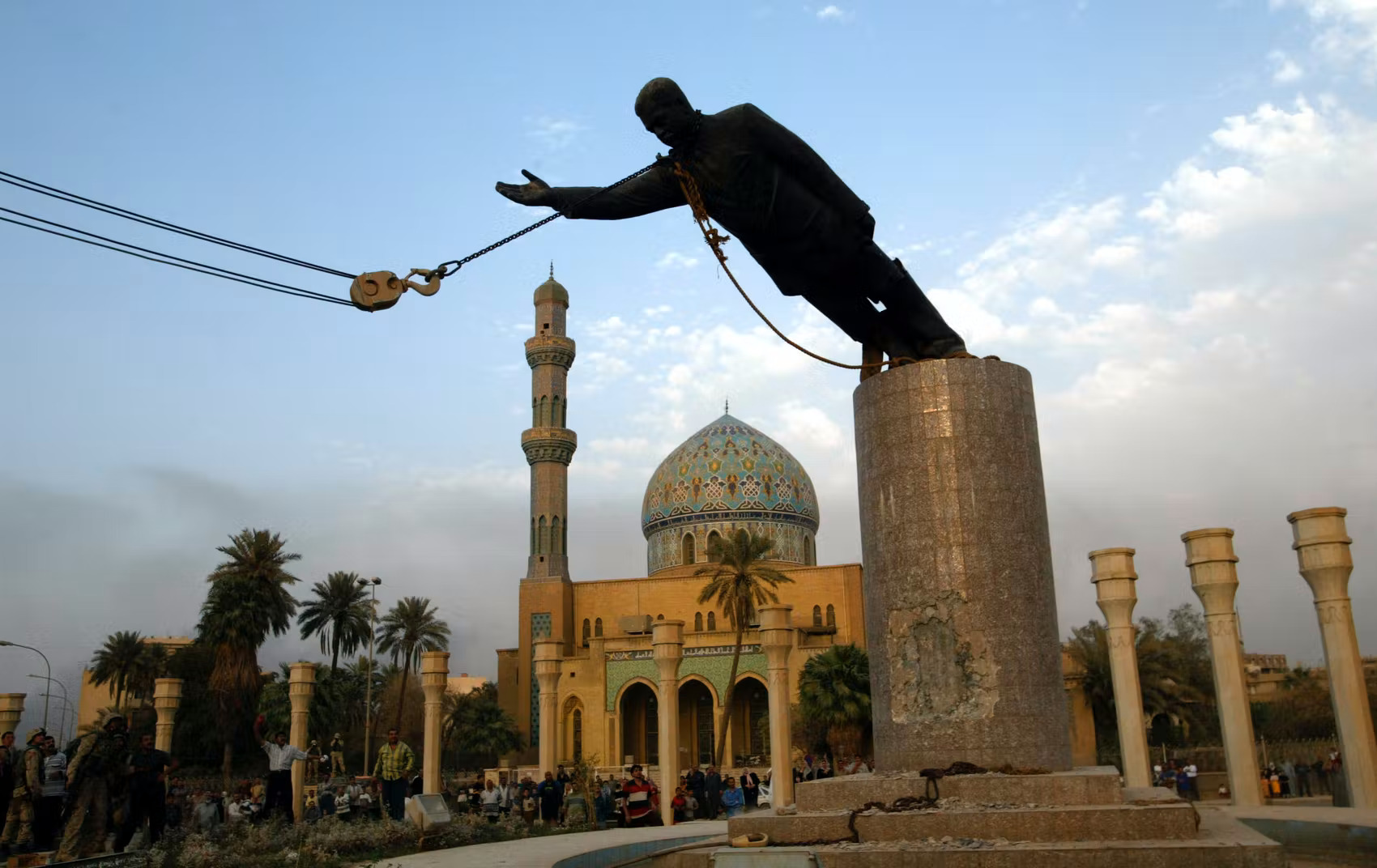
Walker advised the British Government during the Iraq War

In an interview with the BBC in October 2005, Walker suggested that the army's recruitment had been adversely affected by the Iraq War. He also commented on the war in Afghanistan, on which he said "There's a lot of work to be done, of which the military is only a very small part. Ten years, 15 years, long-term. This is not going to be solved in a short term". In the same month, he gave an interview for The Sunday Times, in which he said that soldiers' morale had been damaged by the unpopularity of the war among the British public. Later in 2005, Walker was instrumental in drawing up new procedures for the treatment of British service personnel accused of abusing Iraqi prisoners, following claims that the army had abandoned those soldiers charged in connection with the prisoner abuses. In February 2006, Walker headed up a military delegation to Bulgaria to discuss military cooperation between the British and Bulgarian governments.

Walker gave evidence to the Iraq Inquiry on 1 February 2010, in which he spoke about funding for the invasion of Iraq and subsequent planning.

=== Honorary roles ===
Lord Walker has held a variety of honorary and ceremonial roles in different regiments. He was granted the honorary titles of Colonel Commandant and Deputy Colonel of Queen's Division (of which the Royal Anglian Regiment is part) in April 1992 and Honorary Colonel, 3rd Battalion Duke of Wellington's Regiment (West Riding) (Yorkshire Volunteers), in October 1993, which he relinquished on 30 June 1999. In 1994, he succeeded General Sir John Learmont as Colonel Commandant of the Army Air Corps and held the title until April 2004, when he was relieved by then Lieutenant General Sir Richard Dannatt (later General Lord Dannatt). In 1997, he was appointed honorary Colonel, The Royal Anglian Regiment, in succession to Major General Patrick Stone, and was himself succeeded as Deputy Colonel by Brigadier John Sutherell. Sutherell, then a major general, went on to succeed Walker as Honorary Colonel in February 2000.

== Retirement ==
Walker relinquished his appointment as Chief of the Defence Staff in April 2006 and retired from the Army, succeeded as CDS by Air Chief Marshal Jock Stirrup. In September 2006, Walker was appointed Governor of the Royal Hospital Chelsea, holding the post until February 2011 when he resigned suddenly. On 24 November 2006, it was announced that he would receive a life peerage, and, on 19 December, he was created Baron Walker of Aldringham, of Aldringham in the county of Suffolk, sitting in the House of Lords as a crossbencher. He was given the ceremonial appointment of Deputy Lieutenant of Greater London in 2007. Walker was appointed as an honorary field marshal in the Queen's 2014 Birthday Honours. He serves as the Patron of the British South Africa Police Trust.

== Arms ==
Coat of arms of Michael Walker, Baron Walker of Aldringham
Notes Walker's banner hangs in Westminster Abbey, alongside those of other Knights of the Bath. Adopted 2008 Crest Issuing from a mural crown Or a cocker spaniel's head Azure in the mouth three pheasant feathers Or. Escutcheon Per pale Azure and Gules an orle fracted and there conjouned to two chevronels couped between three acorns slipped Or. Supporters On either side a helmeted guinea fowl Azure beaked casqued and semy of roundels Or the neck and wattles Gules. Motto Stabilis Et Fidus Badge Two Arms in Armour embowed downwards and conjoined at the shoulder Argent each hand gauntleted and grasping a Rose Gules barbed seeded slipped and leaved Or Symbolism The Arms are a variation on the chevronel and fracted orle theme. They are combined with the acorn, the grantee being Governor of the Royal Chelsea Hospital which was founded by Charles II and therefore associated with the acorn taken from Charles II's oak tree. The guinea fowl reflects the grantee's childhood and association with Zimbabwe, formerly Southern Rhodesia. His interest in shooting features in the Crest with a cocker spaniel's head and the pheasant feathers. The mural crown is appropriate for a General in the Army. The grantee's family have hitherto used an arm in armour grasping a rose. Two such arms have been conjoined in the Badge to suggest the initial "W" for Walker.

Military offices
Preceded by Michael Rose	General Officer Commanding North East District and Commander 2nd Infantry Division; 1991–1992	Posts disbanded Post of Commander 2nd Infantry Division next held by Patrick Cordingley in 1995
Preceded by Roger Wheeler	Assistant Chief of the General Staff; 1992–1994	Succeeded by Timothy Granville-Chapman
Preceded by Sir Jeremy Mackenzie	Commander Allied Rapid Reaction Corps; 1994–1997	Succeeded by Sir Michael Jackson
Preceded by Sir Roger Wheeler	Commander-in-Chief, Land Command; 1997–2000	Succeeded by Sir Michael Jackson
Preceded by Sir Roger Wheeler	Chief of the General Staff; 2000–2003	Succeeded by Sir Michael Jackson
Preceded by Sir Michael Boyce	Chief of the Defence Staff; 2003–2006	Succeeded by Sir Jock Stirrup
Honorary titles
Preceded by Sir Jeremy Mackenzie	Governor, Royal Hospital Chelsea; 2006–2011	Succeeded by Sir Redmond Watt
Orders of precedence in the United Kingdom
Preceded by The Lord Jay of Ewelme	Gentlemen; Baron Walker of Aldringham	Followed by The Lord Bew
