= John B. Cooper =

American Air Force general

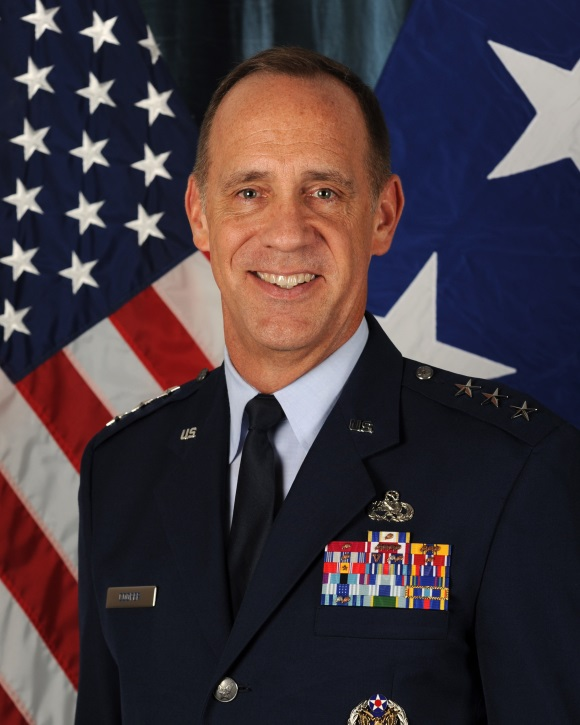
- Nickname: ”Coop”
- Allegiance: United States
- Branch: United States Air Force
- Service years: 1983–2018
- Rank: Lieutenant general
- Commands: 309th Maintenance Wing; 16th Maintenance Group; 4th Logistics Support Squadron; 4th Equipment Maintenance Squadron
- Awards: Air Force Distinguished Service Medal; Legion of Merit; Meritorious Service Medal

John B. Cooper is a retired United States Air Force lieutenant general who most recently served as the Air Force deputy chief of staff for logistics, engineering and force protection. During his 35-year career, he served in various assignments involving munitions, aircraft maintenance and logistics.

He was commissioned in 1983 through the Air Force ROTC program at The Citadel, his early assignments included munitions maintenance officer at Hurlburt Field, Florida, and Plattsburgh AFB, New York then service as an aircraft maintenance officer at Incirlik Air Base, Turkey. He served as an assignments officer and executive officer at the Air Force Personnel Center then commanded logistics and maintenance squadrons with the 4th Fighter Wing at Seymour-Johnson AFB, North Carolina. After a staff tour at Air Combat Command Headquarters, he was the deputy commander of the 3d Maintenance Group at Elmendorf AFB, Alaska and commander of the 16th Maintenance Group at Hurlburt Field then advanced to director of logistics for Air Force Special Operations Command.

His general officer assignments include commander of the 309th Maintenance Wing at Hill AFB, Utah; director of logistics, installations and mission support for Headquarters United States Air Forces in Europe at Ramstein Air Base, Germany; director of logistics on the Air Staff at the Pentagon and director of logistics for Air Combat Command. He assumed his most recent position in May 2015 and retired in August, 2018.

He is a graduate of the Air Command and Staff College and Air War College, holds a master's degree in business management from Webster University and completed senior management courses at The University of Virginia, Harvard University and the University of North Carolina at Chapel Hill. His military awards include the Distinguished Service Medal with Oak Leaf Cluster, Legion of Merit with Oak Leaf Cluster and Meritorious Service Medal with 4 Oak Leaf Clusters.
