= Simon Cooper (British Army officer) =

British Army general (born 1936)

Major General Sir Simon Cooper GCVO
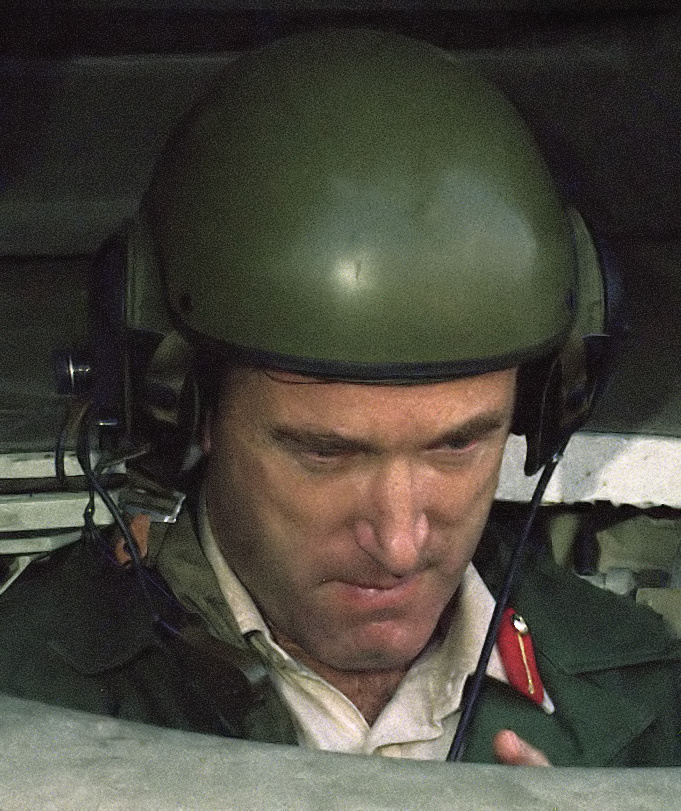
- Cooper in the driver's compartment of an M1 Abrams tank in 1985
- Born: 1936 (age 89–90)
- Relatives: Major General Kenneth Cooper (father)
- Military career
- Allegiance: United Kingdom
- Branch: British Army
- Service years: 1956–1991
- Rank: Major General
- Commands: London District; Royal Military Academy Sandhurst; Household Cavalry; Life Guards
- Conflicts: Indonesia–Malaysia confrontation Malayan Emergency; Operation Banner
- Awards: Knight Grand Cross of the Royal Victorian Order

Major General Sir Simon Christie Cooper, GCVO (born 1936) is a retired British Army officer who served as Major-General commanding the Household Division and General Officer Commanding London District and later Master of the Household to the Sovereign.

== Military career ==
Born the son of Major General Kenneth Cooper and educated at Winchester College and at the Royal Military Academy Sandhurst, Cooper was commissioned into the Life Guards in 1956. He served in Aden, then in London, and in the British Army of the Rhine from 1957 to 1963, when he became adjutant of the Household Cavalry Regiment. He next became aide-de-camp to the Chief of the General Staff in 1965. In 1966 and 1967 he served in Borneo during the Indonesia–Malaysia confrontation on the Malaya peninsular.

Cooper attended the Staff College, Camberley, in 1968, and qualified as a staff officer. From 1969 to 1975 he was in the British Army of the Rhine, and was commanding officer of the Life Guards from 1974 to 1976. He then served as a General Staff Officer at the Staff College from 1976 to 1978, when he became officer commanding the Household Cavalry and Silver Stick to Queen Elizabeth II. In 1981 and 1982 he was officer commanding the Royal Armoured Corps Centre.

In 1983 Cooper attended the Royal College of Defence Studies. He was promoted to major general on 20 October 1983, and was Director of the Royal Armoured Corps from 1984 to 1987, when he was appointed Commandant of the Royal Military Academy Sandhurst. From 1989 to 1991 he was Major-General commanding the Household Division and General Officer Commanding London District. He retired on 26 August 1991.

Cooper was Master of the Household to the Sovereign from 1992 to 2000. He was also made an Extra Equerry in 1992. He was made Honorary Colonel of the Royal Yeomanry (Westminster Dragoons) in 1987.

Cooper was appointed a Knight Commander of the Royal Victorian Order in 1991 on completion of his term commanding the Household Division, and was advanced to Knight Grand Cross of the Royal Victorian Order on his retirement as Master of the Household in 2000.

Military offices
Preceded by Richard Keightley	Commandant of the Royal Military Academy Sandhurst; 1987–1989	Succeeded by Peter Graham
Preceded by Sir Christopher Airy	GOC London District; 1989–1991	Succeeded by Sir Robert Corbett
Court offices
Preceded by Sir Paul Greening	Master of the Household; 1992–2000	Succeeded by Sir Anthony Blackburn
