= Kenneth Cooper (British Army officer) =

British Army general

Major-General Kenneth Cooper CB DSO OBE
- Born: 18 October 1905; Cardiff, Glamorgan, Wales
- Died: 4 September 1981 (aged 75); Salisbury, Wiltshire, England
- Relatives: Major General Sir Simon Cooper (son)
- Military career
- Allegiance: United Kingdom
- Branch: British Army
- Service years: 1924–1959
- Rank: Major-General
- Service number: 27871
- Unit: Royal Corps of Signals
- Commands: 7th Armoured Division (1953–1956); 7th Armoured Brigade (1945); 1st Fife and Forfar Yeomanry (1941–1942)
- Conflicts: Second World War
- Awards: Companion of the Order of the Bath; Distinguished Service Order; Officer of the Order of the British Empire

Major-General Kenneth Christie Cooper, CB, DSO, OBE (18 October 1905 – 4 September 1981) was a senior British Army officer who commanded the 7th Armoured Division from 1953 to 1956.

== Military career ==
Educated at Berkhamsted School, Cooper was commissioned into the 53rd (Welsh) Divisional Signals Regiment in 1924. He transferred to the Royal Tank Corps in 1927.

Cooper served in the Second World War as commanding officer of the Fife and Forfar Yeomanry from October 1941, as a General Staff Officer with IX Corps in North Africa from 1942 and as a Brigadier on the General Staff at Allied Force Headquarters from 1943. His last wartime role was as commander of the 7th Armoured Brigade in Italy from 1945.

Cooper was appointed Brigadier, Royal Armoured Corps at Northern Command in 1947, chief of staff at West Africa Command in 1948 and, after attending the Imperial Defence College, was Assistant commandant of the Staff College, Camberley in 1952. He went on to be General Officer Commanding 7th Armoured Division in 1953 and chief of staff Allied Forces Northern Europe in 1956, before retiring in 1959.

== Personal life ==
Cooper married Barbara Mary Harding‑Newman; they had one son, Major General Sir Simon Cooper.

Cooper lived at West End House in Donhead St Andrew in Wiltshire.

Military offices
| Preceded by Charles Jones | GOC 7th Armoured Division; 1953–1956 | Succeeded by John Hackett |
