= Peter Hudson (British Army officer) =

Lieutenant-General Sir Peter Hudson KCB CBE DL
- Born: 14 September 1923
- Died: 8 August 2000 (aged 76)
- Military career
- Allegiance: United Kingdom
- Branch: British Army
- Service years: 1944–1980
- Rank: Lieutenant-General
- Commands: 3rd Bn Royal Green Jackets; 39th Infantry Brigade; Eastern District
- Conflicts: Mau Mau Uprising; Malayan Emergency; Operation Banner
- Awards: Knight Commander of the Order of the Bath; Commander of the Order of the British Empire

Lieutenant-General Sir Peter Hudson KCB CBE DL (14 September 1923 – 8 August 2000) was a British Army officer who served as deputy commander of UK Land Forces.

== Early life ==
Hudson was educated at Wellingborough School and Jesus College, Cambridge.

== Military career ==
Hudson was commissioned in to the Rifle Brigade in 1944. He took part in the response to the Mau Mau Uprising in Kenya in 1954 and the Malayan Emergency in the late 1950s and was made commanding officer of 3rd Bn Royal Green Jackets in 1966. He was appointed commander of 39th Infantry Brigade in Northern Ireland in 1969 at just the time when the Troubles were escalating, director of army staff duties in 1972 and commander of Eastern District in 1973. He went on to be chief of staff for Allied Forces Northern Europe in 1975 and deputy commander-in-chief UK Land Forces in 1977 before retiring in 1980.

In retirement he became Secretary-general of the Order of St John and Lieutenant of the Tower of London. He was also Deputy Lieutenant of Berkshire.

He is buried at St Peter and St Paul Churchyard at Yattendon in Berkshire.

== Family ==
In 1949 he married Susan Anne Knollys; they had a daughter and adopted a son and a daughter.

Military offices
Preceded by David Scott-Barrett	General Officer Commanding Eastern District; 1973–1975	Succeeded by David Tabor
Preceded by Sir Hugh Beach	Deputy Commander-in-Chief UK Land Forces; 1977–1980	Succeeded by Sir Frank Kitson
