= HMS Asheldham =

Minesweeper of the Royal Navy

History

United Kingdom
- Name: HMS Asheldham
- Namesake: Asheldham
- Builder: Philip and Son
- Launched: 9 September 1953
- Completed: 9 September 1954
- Fate: Transferred to Malaysia, 1 April 1959
- Notes: Pennant number(s): M2604 / IMS04

Malaysia
- Name: KD Sri Perlis
- Acquired: 1 April 1959
- Fate: broken up 1967

General characteristics
- Class & type: Ham-class minesweeper
- Displacement: 120 long tons (122 t) standard; 159 long tons (162 t) full load
- Length: 100 ft (30 m) p/p; 106 ft 6 in (32.46 m) o/a
- Beam: 21 ft (6.4 m)
- Draught: 5 ft 6 in (1.68 m)
- Propulsion: 2 shaft Paxman diesels; 1,100 bhp (820 kW)
- Speed: 14 knots (16 mph; 26 km/h)
- Complement: 15
- Armament: 1 × Bofors 40 mm L/60 gun

HMS Asheldham was one of 93 ships of the Ham class of inshore minesweepers.

Their names were all chosen from villages ending in -ham. The minesweeper was named after Asheldham in Essex.

HMS Asheldham (Pennant number M2604) was a member of the first series of Ham-class minesweepers, with composite wood and aluminium construction. It was built by Philip and Son of Dartmouth, Devon and was completed on 9 September 1953.

Asheldham served as part of the 232nd Mine Sweeper Squadron at Harwich in Essex from 1954 to 1956, after which it was placed into reserve. The Ham class had proved too small to carry modern minesweeping equipment and most of the class were withdrawn from use or transferred to secondary roles.

The ship was transferred to the Royal Malayan Navy on 1 April 1958, being renamed Sri Perlis. Following transfer, Sri Perlis' 40mm Bofors gun and minesweeping gear was removed and replaced by three 20 mm Oerlikon cannon, although the minesweeping gear was later re-fitted, with the ship retaining a single Oerlikon gun.

== Sources ==
- Blackman, Raymond V.B., ed. Jane's Fighting Ships 1952–1953. New York: McGraw-Hill, 1953.
- Blackman, Raymond V. B. (1960). Jane's Fighting Ships 1960–61. London: Sampson Low, Marston & Co. Ltd.
- Blackman, Raymond V. B. (1962). Jane's Fighting Ships 1962–63. London: Sampson Low, Marston & Co. Ltd.
- Gardiner, Robert; Chumbley, Stephen (1995). Conway's All The World's Fighting Ships 1947–1995. Annapolis, Maryland, USA: Naval Institute Press. ISBN 1-55750-132-7.
- Worth, Jack (1986). British Warships Since 1945: Part 4: Minesweepers. Liskeard, UK: Maritime Books. ISBN 0-907771-12-2.
