= State Procession at the State Opening of Parliament =

British procession

The State Opening of Parliament includes a State Procession, a formal display of the Sovereign, dignified by a sizeable entourage made up of Great Officers of State and members of the Royal Household. The State Procession is now confined to the interior of the Palace of Westminster, but in earlier centuries it followed an outdoor route to and from Westminster Abbey.

The State Opening of Parliament is one of the few occasions when a State Procession is to be seen; the Coronation Procession is another.

== Historical background ==
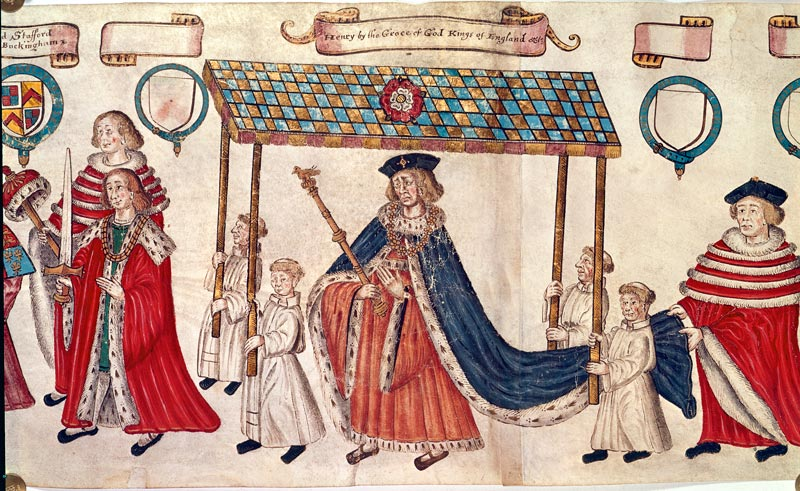
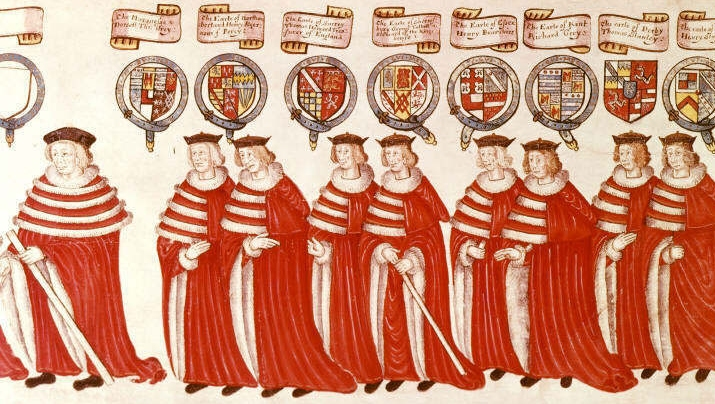
King Henry VIII, preceded by the Sword of State and Cap of Maintenance, in procession from Westminster Abbey for the State Opening of Parliament, 4 February 1512. Parliament Procession Roll, 1512, detail from 17th century copy, British Library, Add MS 22306

An account of Henry VII opening Parliament on 7 November 1485 includes a description of the processions which preceded it. By this time the pattern had become established whereby the Peers of the Realm would assemble at the Palace of Westminster (which was the King's principal residence). They would then go in procession on foot to nearby Westminster Abbey for Mass, prior to returning in procession to the Palace for the Opening of Parliament itself. (During the Mass, the 'Knights and Burgesses' who had been elected to represent the Commons would gather in the Parliament Chamber for a roll-call, overseen by the Lord Steward who would leave the Abbey early for this purpose.)

In due course, the heralds, who had the responsibility (under the Earl Marshal's direction) for marshalling the procession, began to keep detailed records of the event, the earliest of which dates from Henry VIII's first Opening of Parliament in 1510. The 1512 account includes an illustration of the Procession depicting participants together with their armorial bearings. It shows the Lords Spiritual at the front of the procession, accompanied by Heralds and Gentleman Ushers; the Serjeants-at-Arms follow with their maces, just ahead of Garter King of Arms. The King is preceded by the Cap of Maintenance, borne by the Lord High Constable and the Sword of State, borne by his son. The King himself carries a sceptre and walks beneath a richly decorated canopy supported by four monks. His train-bearer is the Lord Great Chamberlain (carrying his white wand of office), who is 'assisted by' the Lord Chamberlain. The Lords Temporal follow, among whom can be seen the Lord Steward (with his white wand of office).

Change was necessitated after the Palace of Westminster was severely damaged by fire in 1514. In both 1523 and 1529, the Opening of Parliament took place in Bridewell Palace, following a service in nearby Blackfriars Church. At around this time, Westminster ceased to be a royal residence, becoming instead the fixed abode of Parliament itself. In 1536, the procession set off from the new royal residence of Whitehall. Three years later, the King, Peers and attendants were to be seen riding in procession from Whitehall to the Abbey, in their robes and on horseback. This precedent was followed in subsequent years: Queen Elizabeth I rode on occasion or else was carried in a horse-borne litter (as had been her sister Queen Mary I, a practice that would also be followed by Queen Anne over a century later). On occasion (and especially in times of plague) the King would travel by river from Whitehall to Westminster, using a State Barge.

For the 1679 State Opening, there was no procession and no service in the Abbey (for fear of a Popish Plot). The service was not reinstated, so subsequent processions went directly from the Palace of Whitehall to the Palace of Westminster. At about this time, the practice of all Peers taking part in the procession ceased (due in no small part to the increasing size of the Peerage). In 1698, Whitehall Palace burned down; thereafter St James's became the usual point of departure. In the Georgian period, carriages began regularly to be used for the procession to Westminster (though this was not entirely new - both Elizabeth I (on occasion) and Oliver Cromwell had used carriages to get to the State Opening). Under George IV, the Palace of Westminster was remodeled by Sir John Soane to provide space for the carriages, a robing room, and a grand interior processional route to the House of Lords.

The Old Palace of Westminster was largely destroyed by fire in 1834. The new Palace was purpose built (among other things) to accommodate the ceremonial of a State Opening. Thus in Victoria's reign, the long-established ceremonial of the State Opening was married to its now-familiar architectural setting of Barry and Pugin's grand parliamentary interiors. The pattern of events then was much as it is now: the monarch, members of the royal family and members of the Household arrive in a Carriage Procession from Buckingham Palace (preceded by the items of royal regalia with their attendants); after a time of preparation, the monarch proceeds in State from the King's Robing Room, through the Royal Gallery and Prince's Chamber, to the Throne in the House of Lords.

== Present-day Participants in the Procession ==
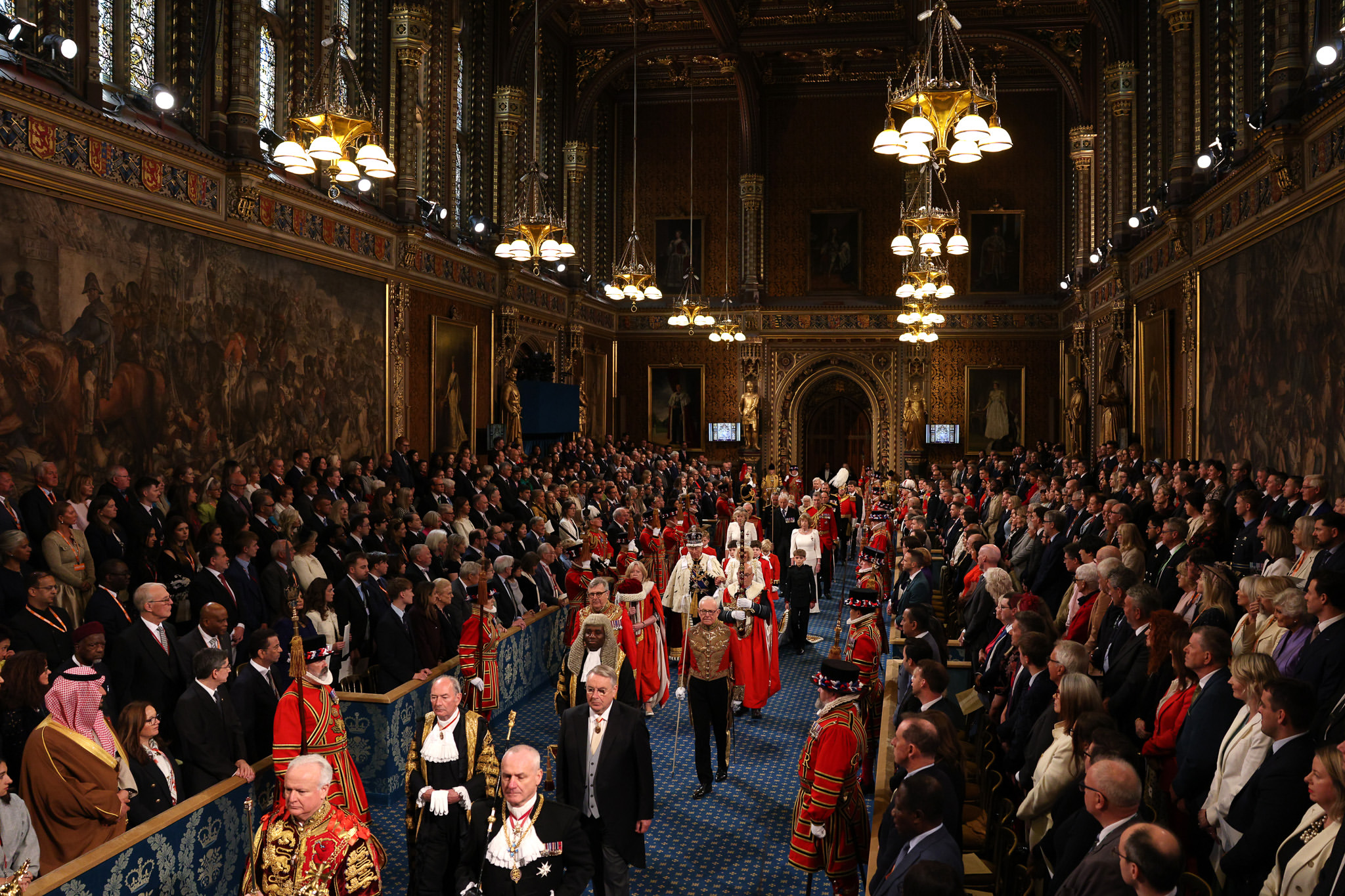
The middle part of the procession moving through the Royal Gallery in 2026. Garter King of Arms and Black Rod lead the Lord Speaker and Great Officers of State ahead of the King and Queen.

The Procession falls into four main sections:

- The Officers of arms, two Serjeants-at-Arms, Black Rod
- The Great Officers of State
- The King and Queen (immediately preceded by peers carrying the Sword of State and the Cap of Maintenance) (Note: The Imperial State Crown is also carried ahead of the monarch if for any particular reason it is not being worn.)
- Members of the Royal Household

The latter contingent includes a combination of royal officials and attendants, plus others who are there by virtue of holding honorary positions in the Royal Household (namely several Government Whips and the professional heads of the Armed Services).

The Prince and Princess of Wales, if present, would join the procession behind the King and Queen.

As of 2023, the Procession was constituted as follows:

Pursuivants	Pursuivants
Heralds	Heralds
Norroy and Ulster King of Arms	Clarenceux King of Arms
Serjeant at Arms	Serjeant at Arms
Lady Usher of the Black Rod	Garter King of Arms
The Lord Privy Seal (Note: The Leader of the House of Lords (who since 2019 has also held the office of Lord Privy Seal) is usually given the role of carrying the Cap of Maintenance, and therefore walks just ahead of the monarch.)	The Lord Speaker
The Lord High Chancellor	The Lord President of the Council
The Lord Great Chamberlain	The Earl Marshal
The Sword of State	The Cap of Maintenance
(borne by a Peer)	(borne by a Peer) (Note: Usually the Leader of the House of Lords.)
His Majesty The King accompanied by Her Majesty The Queen
(The King wearing the Imperial State Crown, his train borne by four Pages of Honour; the Queen wearing a diadem, her train borne by two Pages of Honour.)
A Queen's Companion	A Queen's Companion
Gold Stick in Waiting (Note: The Princess Royal in 2023.)	The Lord Steward	The Master of the Horse
Aide de Camp (Chief of the Defence Staff)
Air Aide-de-Camp (Note: The Chief of the Air Staff.)	First and Principal Naval Aide de Camp (Note: The First Sea Lord and Chief of the Naval Staff.)	Aides de Camp General (Note: The Chief of the General Staff and Commander Strategic Command in 2023.)
Captain of the Yeomen of the Guard (Note: A Government Whip in the House of Lords)	A Lord or Baroness in Waiting (Note: A Government Whip in the House of Lords)	Captain of the Gentlemen at Arms (Note: A Government Whip in the House of Lords)
Keeper of the Privy Purse	Private Secretary to The Queen	Private Secretary to the Sovereign
Comptroller of the Household (Note: A Government Whip in the House of Commons.)	Treasurer of the Household (Note: A Government Whip in the House of Commons.)
Equerry in Waiting to The King	Equerry in Waiting to The Queen	Comptroller, The Lord Chamberlain's Office
Silver Stick in Waiting	Field Officer in Brigade Waiting

== Other members of the royal family ==
Occasionally one or two of the monarch's children have walked in the procession, behind the monarch and consort, and occupied positions on the dais either side of the throne (sometimes accompanied by their spouses). (Note: Under the terms of the House of Lords Precedence Act 1539 'none but the King’s Children shall sit on either Side of the Cloth of Estate in Parliament'.)

Prior to the passing of the House of Lords Act 1999, members of the extended royal family who were Peers or Peeresses (including Dowagers) often used to attend the State Opening; they, however, were seated on the benches of the chamber and did not form part of the State Procession.

== Carriage procession ==
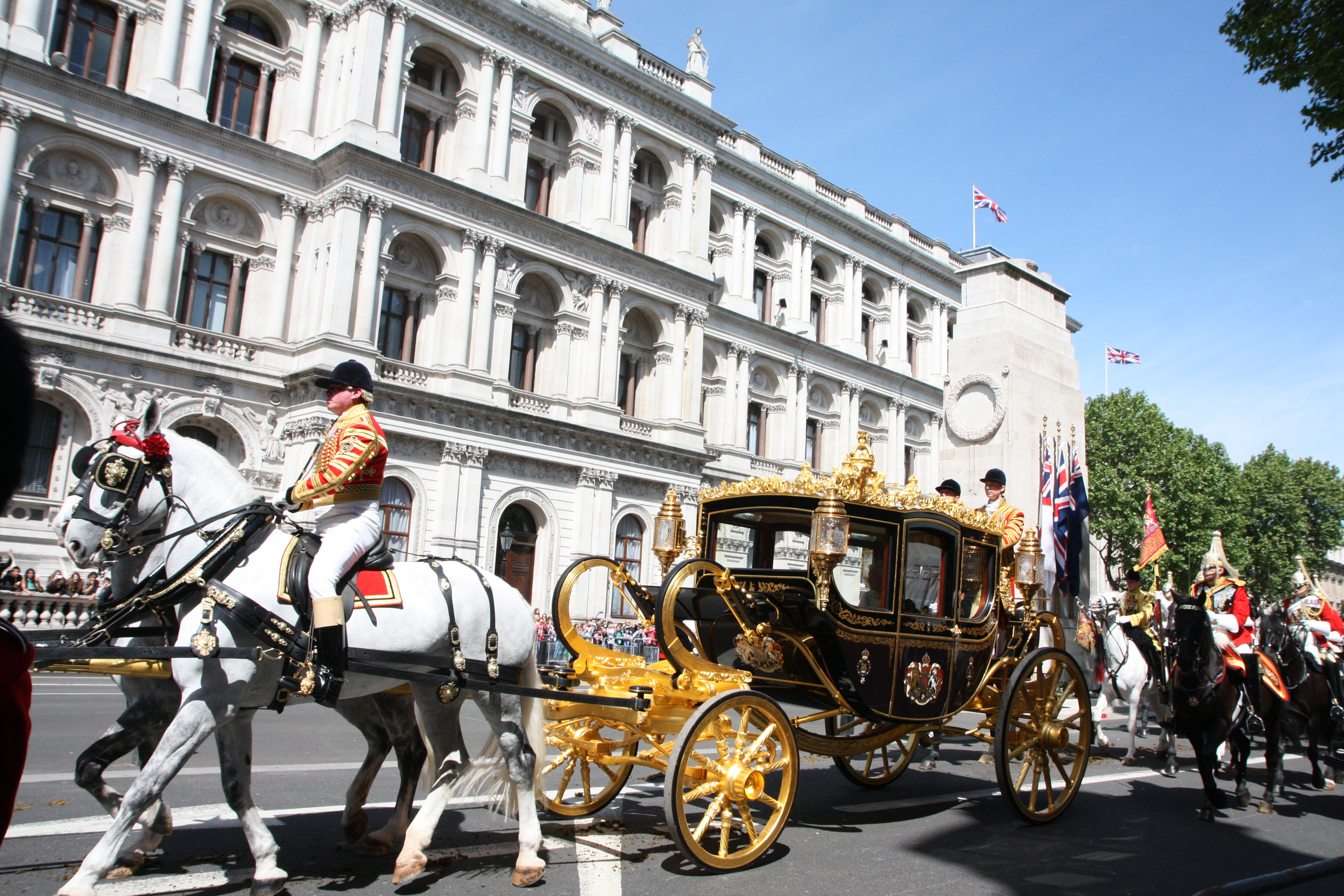
Queen Elizabeth II passes the Foreign & Commonwealth Office in the Diamond Jubilee State Coach to the Palace of Westminster for the State Opening of Parliament, 27 May 2015.

On the morning of the State Opening, the King and Queen travel 'in State' from Buckingham Palace to the Palace of Westminster, riding in a state coach and escorted by a Sovereign's Escort of the Household Cavalry. Other carriages follow (namely the Glass Coach and three state landaus), conveying members of the Royal Household who will later take part in the State Procession.

Earlier, a separate carriage procession (escorted by a Regalia Escort of the Household Cavalry) conveys the crown, the sword of state and the cap of maintenance (in one carriage), and the serjeants at arms with their maces (in another) by the same route to the Palace of Westminster. Royal Watermen accompany the procession, reminiscent of earlier times when the regalia was conveyed to the palace by river.

After the State Opening has concluded, the carriage processions return to Buckingham Palace.

== See also ==
- State Opening of Parliament
