= Christopher Airy =

British Army officer (1934–2025)

Major-General Sir Christopher Airy KCVO CBE
- Born: 8 March 1934
- Died: 7 April 2025 (aged 91)
- Military career
- Allegiance: United Kingdom
- Branch: British Army
- Service years: 1954–1989
- Rank: Major-General
- Service number: 433040
- Unit: Scots Guards
- Commands: London District; 5th Field Force; 1st Battalion Scots Guards
- Conflicts: Operation Banner
- Awards: Knight Commander of the Royal Victorian Order; Commander of the Order of the British Empire

Major-General Sir Christopher John Airy, KCVO, CBE (8 March 1934 – 7 April 2025) was a British Army officer who served as General Officer Commanding the London District and Major-General commanding the Household Division from 1986 to 1989.

== Military career ==
Educated at the Royal Military Academy Sandhurst, Airy was commissioned into the Grenadier Guards in 1954. Airy became personal military assistant to the Secretary of State for War in 1960, deputy assistant adjutant-general and regimental adjutant in 1967 and brigade major of the 4th Guards Brigade in 1971. In 1974 he transferred to the Scots Guards on appointment as commanding officer of the 1st Battalion. Two years later he became Military Assistant to the Master-General of the Ordnance.

In 1979 Airy became commander of the 5th Field Force, and in 1982 assistant chief of staff at United Kingdom Land Forces. Promoted to major general in 1983, he served at the Royal College of Defence Studies, before becoming Major-General commanding the Household Division and General Officer Commanding London District in 1986. He retired in 1989.

Airy was appointed a Commander of the Order of the British Empire in 1984, and a Knight Commander of the Royal Victorian Order in 1989.

== Civilian life ==
After retiring from the military, at the recommendation of TV personality Jimmy Saville, Airy was appointed private secretary to the Prince and Princess of Wales in 1990. Not finding his feet in the role, Airy quit in May 1991.

== Personal life and death ==
Airy was born at the Queen Elizabeth Military Hospital, Woolwich, on 8 March 1934. His father, Lieutenant-Colonel Eustace Airy, who served in the RAF in the 1920s, become a pilot and then transferred to the Royal East Kent Regiment and to Gibraltar in the late 1930s. During the Second World War the senior Airy was involved in intelligence work in the Far East. Soon after the outbreak of war, the family returned to England.

Airy was educated at Marlborough College, attended a course at the Sorbonne in Paris and then Sandhurst, In 1959, Airy married Judith Stephenson.

After leaving the service of Prince Charles and Lady Diana, he and his wife retired to a farmhouse in Somerset. The couple were married for 65 years before Lady Airy died in January 2025. The couple had one son and two daughters.

Airy died on 7 April 2025, at the age of 91.

Military offices
Preceded by Sir James Eyre	GOC London District; 1986–1989	Succeeded by Sir Simon Cooper
Court offices
Preceded by Sir John Riddell	Private Secretary to the Prince of Wales; 1990–1991	Succeeded by Richard Aylard
