= Ben Bathurst =

British Army officer (born 1964)

His Excellency Lieutenant General Sir Ben Bathurst KCVO CBE
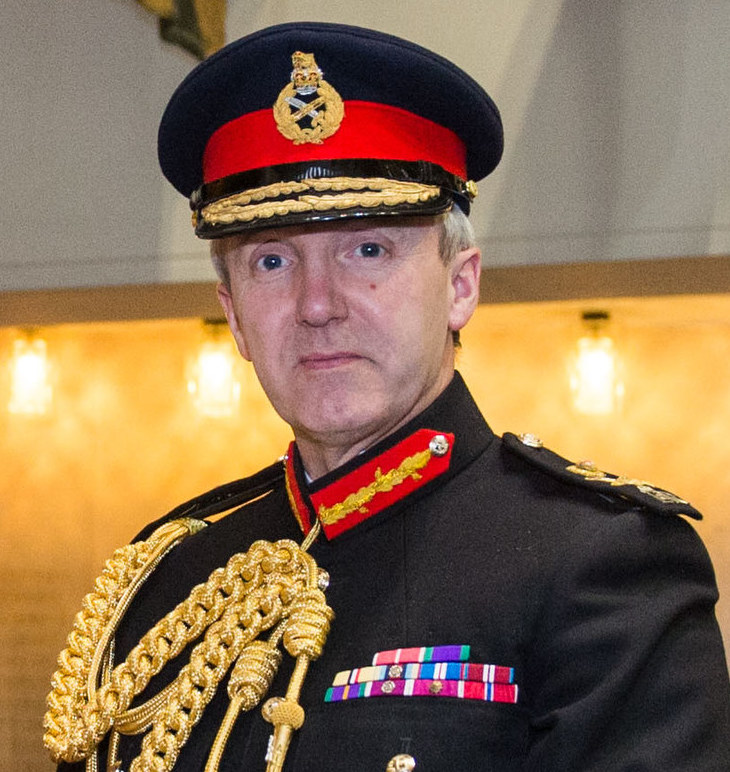
- Major General Bathurst in 2021

Governor of Gibraltar
- Incumbent
- Assumed office 4 June 2024
- Monarch: Charles III
- Chief Minister: Fabian Picardo
- Preceded by: Sir David Steel

UK Military Representative to NATO
- In office 2020–2023
- Preceded by: Sir George Norton
- Succeeded by: Sir Ian Cave

Major-General commanding the Household Division (GOC London District)
- In office 2016–2019
- Preceded by: Sir Edward Smyth-Osbourne
- Succeeded by: Sir Chris Ghika

Personal details
- Born: 16 April 1964 (age 62) Haslemere, Surrey, England
- Parent: Sir Benjamin Bathurst (father)

Military service
- Branch: British Army
- Service years: 1983–2024
- Rank: Lieutenant General
- Unit: Welsh Guards
- Commands: 1st Battalion Welsh Guards
- Conflicts / operations: Operation Banner; War in Afghanistan; Iraq War
- Awards: Knight Commander of the Royal Victorian Order; Commander of the Order of the British Empire; Officer of the Legion of Merit (United States); Bronze Star Medal (United States)

Lieutenant-General Sir Benjamin John Bathurst, KCVO, CBE (born 15 April 1964) is a retired senior British Army officer. He is currently serving as Governor of Gibraltar, having replaced Sir David Steel in June 2024.

== Early life and education ==
Bathurst was born on 15 April 1964 in Haslemere, Surrey, England. He is the son of Admiral of the Fleet Sir Benjamin Bathurst. He was educated at Eton College, an all-boys public school in Berkshire. He studied at the University of Bristol, graduating with a Bachelor of Science degree in 1986, and at Cranfield University, graduating with a Master of Arts degree in 1996.

== Military career ==
Bathurst was commissioned into the Welsh Guards in September 1983. He became commanding officer of the 1st Battalion Welsh Guards in July 2004. In 2005, he was appointed an Officer of the Order of the British Empire. He went on to be Director of Public Relations (Army) in September 2006, Deputy Director Strategy, Plans and Assessment in October 2008 and Commander, Initial Training Group in January 2010.

Bathurst became Director of Training in February 2011, Senior British Military Representative in Afghanistan in May 2014, and Major-General commanding the Household Division in June 2016. He was appointed a Commander of the Order of the British Empire in 2014, and awarded the United States Legion of Merit (Degree of Officer) in May 2018. He was appointed a Knight Commander of the Royal Victorian Order on 7 November 2019. In 2020, on completion of his tour at London District, he took up the appointment of UK Military Representative to NATO and the European Union in the rank of lieutenant general. Bathurst was formally promoted to lieutenant general on 13 March 2020 and served as the National Military Representative to the European Union.

Bathurst was Deputy Colonel Commandant of the Adjutant General's Corps until August 2023, and retired from the army 20 April 2024.

=== Governor of Gibraltar ===
In March 2024, it was confirmed that Bathurst would become Governor of Gibraltar in June 2024. He was sworn in on 4 June 2024.

Viceregal styles of Sir Ben Bathurst (2024–present)
- Reference style: His Excellency
- Spoken style: Your Excellency

Military offices
Preceded by Sir Edward Smyth-Osbourne	GOC London District; 2016–2019	Succeeded by Chris Ghika
Preceded by Sir George Norton	UK Military Representative to NATO; 2020–2023	Succeeded by Ian Cave
Government offices
Preceded by Sir David Steel	Governor of Gibraltar; 2024–present	Incumbent
