= James Bowder =

British Army general

Major General Sir James Bowder KCVO OBE
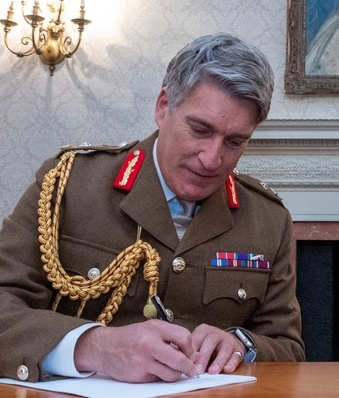
- Bowder in 2022
- Born: 1973; Hemel Hempstead
- Military career
- Allegiance: United Kingdom
- Branch: British Army
- Service years: 1996–present
- Rank: Major General
- Unit: Grenadier Guards
- Commands: London District; Household Division; 6th (United Kingdom) Division; 1st Intelligence, Surveillance and Reconnaissance Brigade; 1st Battalion, Grenadier Guards
- Conflicts: War in Afghanistan
- Awards: Knight Commander of the Royal Victorian Order; Officer of the Order of the British Empire; Queen's Commendation for Valuable Service

Major General Sir James Maurice Hannan Bowder, KCVO OBE (born 1973) is a senior British Army officer. He served as General Officer Commanding, London District and the Major-General commanding the Household Division from 2023 to 2026.

== Military career ==
Following training at the Royal Military Academy Sandhurst, Bowder was commissioned into the Grenadier Guards on 13 April 1996. He became commanding officer of 1st Battalion, Grenadier Guards in 2011, in which role he was deployed to Afghanistan.

He went on to be commander of the 1st Intelligence, Surveillance and Reconnaissance Brigade in June 2016, Head of Strategy for the Army in June 2018, and General Officer Commanding Force Troops Command in July 2019. Force Troops Command was renamed as 6th (United Kingdom) Division on 1 August 2019. He then became Director Army Futures in September 2021. He has been the Regimental Lieutenant Colonel of the Grenadier Guards since 18 June 2022, a ceremonial appointment.

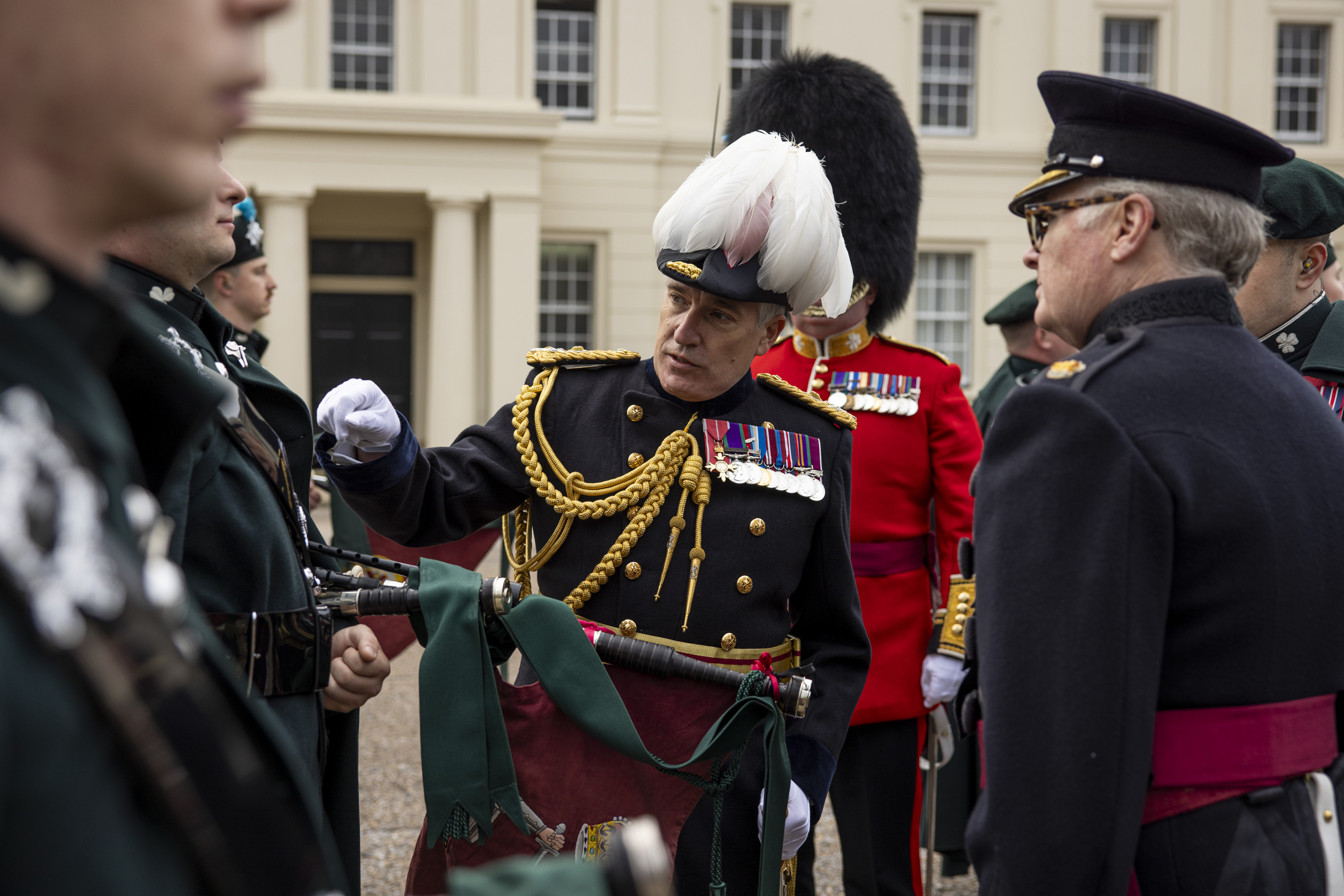
Bowder inspects a band of the Household Division in 2024

Bowder was appointed General Officer Commanding, London District and the Major-General commanding the Household Division in September 2023, stepping down as such in November 2026. On 19 October 2026 he was appointed a Knight Commander of the Royal Victorian Order (KCVO) on his retirement.

Military offices
Preceded by Tom Copinger-Symes	General Officer Commanding, Force Troops Command; July–August 2019	Command disbanded
New command	General Officer Commanding, 6th (United Kingdom) Division; 2019–2021	Succeeded by Gerald Strickland
Preceded by Sir Christopher Ghika	GOC London District; 2023–2026	Succeeded by Mark Berry
