= Philip Smith (British Army officer) =

British Army general

Lieutenant-General Philip Smith CB
- Born: 10 January 1837; Woodhall, Hertfordshire
- Died: 1 November 1894 (aged 54); Huntingdon, Huntingdonshire
- Military career
- Allegiance: United Kingdom
- Branch: British Army
- Service years: 1855–1892
- Rank: Lieutenant-General
- Commands: Home District; Grenadier Guards
- Conflicts: Mahdist War
- Awards: Companion of the Order of the Bath

Lieutenant-General Philip Smith, CB (10 January 1837 – 1 November 1894) was a senior British Army officer who served as Major General commanding the Brigade of Guards and General Officer Commanding the Home District from 1889 until his retirement in 1892.

== Family ==
Smith was born at the Woodhall estate in Hertfordshire, the third son of Colonel Abel Smith and Frances Anne Calvert, daughter of General Sir Harry Calvert.

== Military career ==
Smith was commissioned into the Grenadier Guards in 1855. He went on to be adjutant of his regiment in 1859. He became commanding officer of a battalion of his regiment in 1880 and was appointed a Companion of the Order of the Bath following the Expedition to Egypt in 1882. He took command of the whole Regiment in 1885.

He was promoted to major general in 1886, and made major general commanding the Brigade of Guards and general officer commanding the Home District in 1889. He became a member of the council of the National Rifle Association and died at Hinchingbrooke House in 1894.

Military offices
Preceded by Sir Reginald Gipps	GOC Home District; 1889–1892	Succeeded by Lord Methuen
