= Chris Ghika =

British general

Major General Sir Chris Ghika KCVO CBE
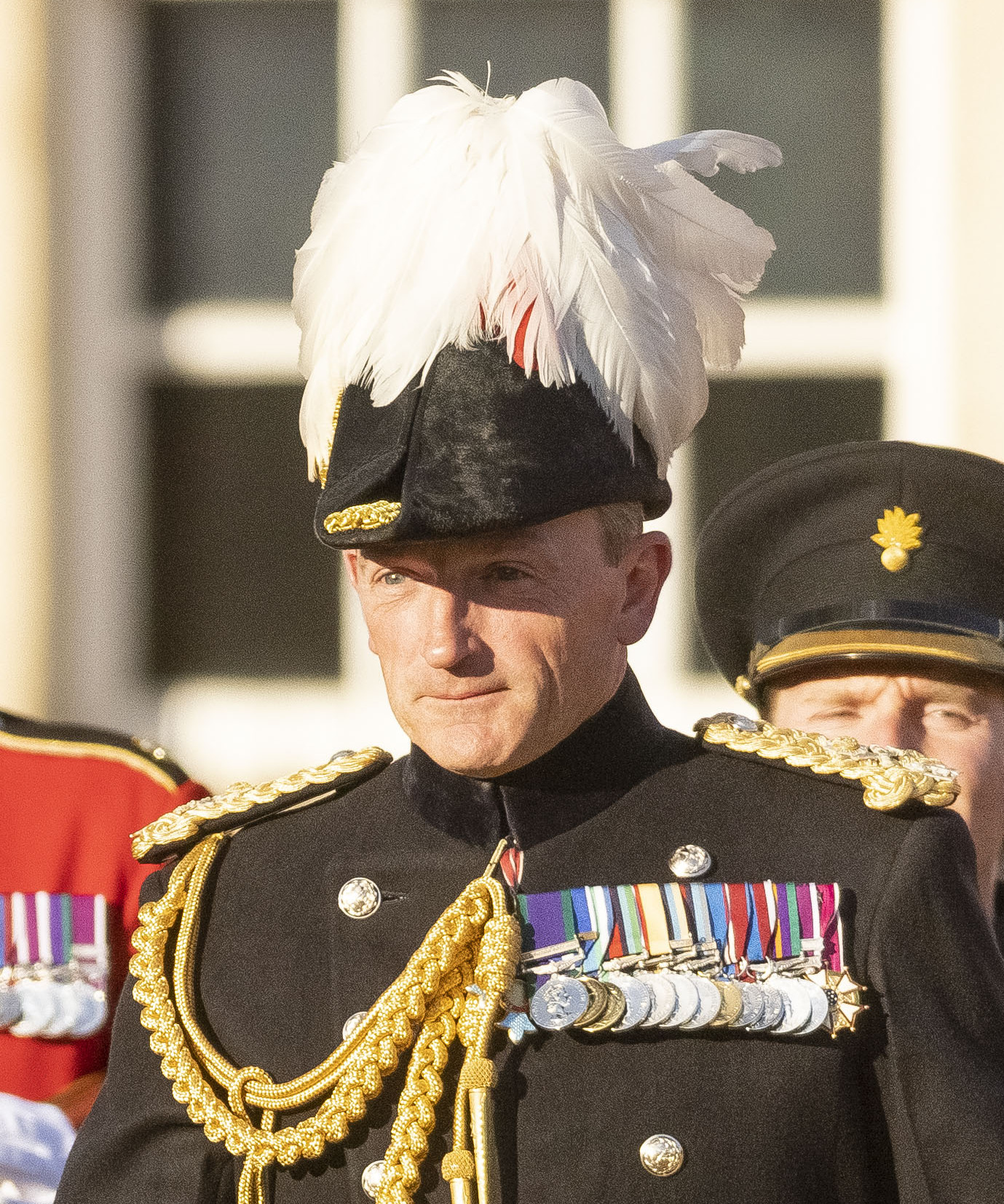
- Ghika as major general commanding the Household Division, 2022
- Born: Christopher John Ghika; 28 September 1969 (age 57); Wimbledon, England
- Military career
- Allegiance: United Kingdom
- Branch: British Army
- Service years: 1993–2023
- Rank: Major General
- Unit: Irish Guards
- Commands: London District; Household Division; 1st Battalion Irish Guards
- Conflicts: The Troubles; Iraq War; War in Afghanistan; Operation Inherent Resolve
- Awards: Knight Commander of the Royal Victorian Order; Commander of the Order of the British Empire; Legion of Merit (United States)

Major General Sir Christopher John Ghika, KCVO, CBE (born 28 September 1969) is a retired senior British Army officer. He was deputy commander of the US-led military coalition against ISIS, the Combined Joined Task Force-Operation Inherent Resolve, from 2018 to 2019 and Major-General commanding the Household Division from 2019 to 2023.

== Early life ==
Ghika is the son of Brigadier Prince John Nicholas Ghika, CBE (1928–2003), an Irish Guards officer who traced his royal title back to 1658, when the Ghica dynasty (a dynasty of Albanian origin) ruled over Moldavia, later Wallachia, and finally the Kingdom of Romania. Chris Ghika does not use the title "Prince" publicly. He was educated at Ampleforth College.

== Military career ==
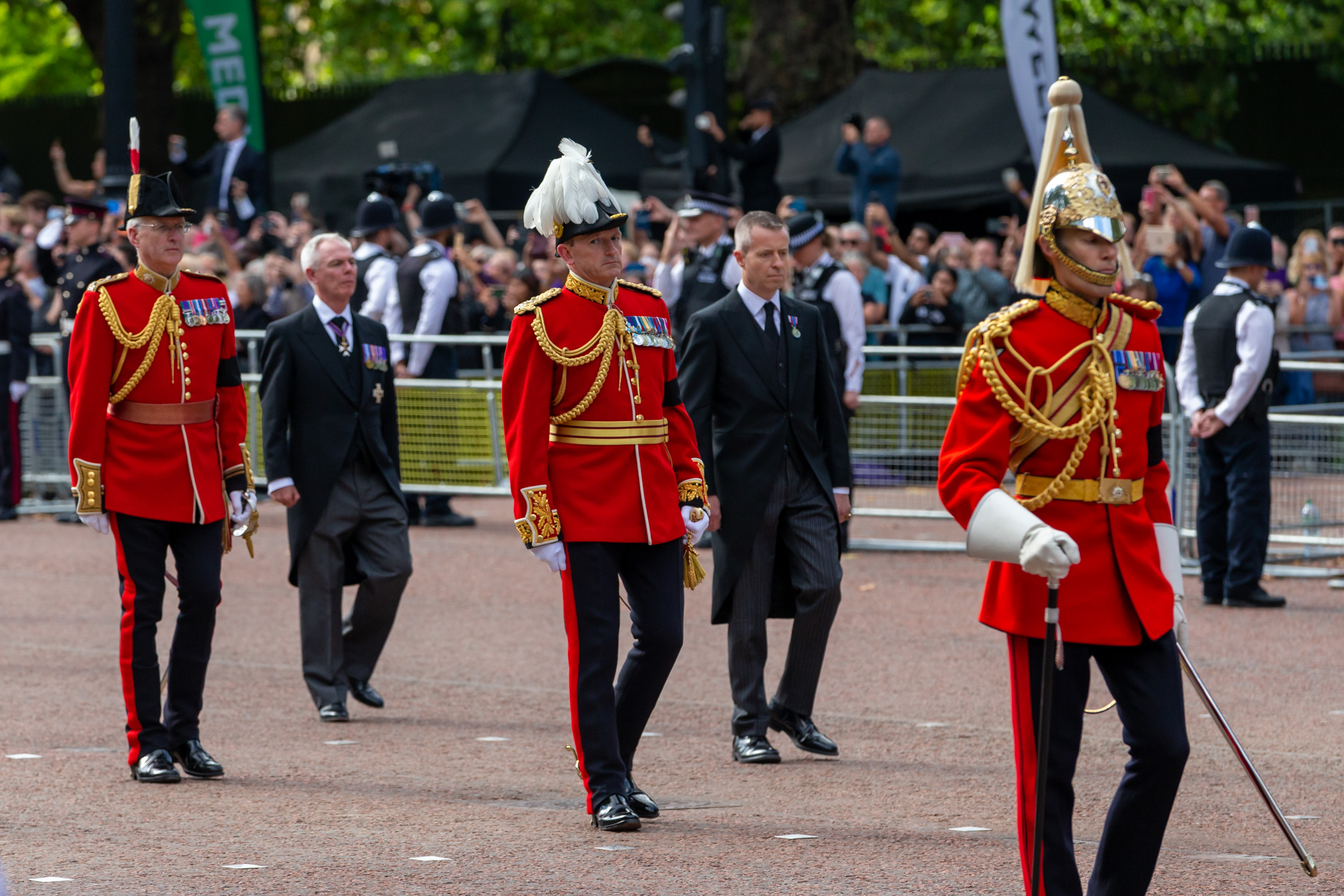
Ghika (centre) in the Procession to the Lying-in-State of Elizabeth II

Ghika was commissioned into the Irish Guards in 1993, upon completing the commissioning course at the Royal Military Academy, Sandhurst. After various field and staff roles, he became commanding officer of the 1st Battalion, Irish Guards, in 2010. He was deployed as the head of a battlegroup, as a lieutenant colonel, to Helmand Province, Afghanistan. He later went on to be Deputy Commander of the 1st (US) Infantry Division in 2014, Head of Personnel Capability in the Army Headquarters in September 2015, and Deputy Commander Strategy and Information of Combined Joined Task Force-Operation Inherent Resolve in 2018.

Ghika was appointed Major-General commanding the Household Division on 15 November 2019. In June 2020, during the coronavirus pandemic, he was responsible for the modified Trooping the Colour ceremony at Windsor Castle. He was appointed the commanding officer of the procession to Westminster Hall and the subsequent funeral of Queen Elizabeth II. He was appointed a Knight Commander of the Royal Victorian Order during an audience with King Charles III on 28 June 2023; during this audience he relinquished his appointment as Major-General commanding the Household Division and also as GOC London. He formally retired from the army on 30 December 2023.

Ghika became Regimental Lieutenant Colonel of the Irish Guards on 10 June 2022.

== Later career ==
After relinquishing his appointment as Major-General commanding the Household Division and retiring from the army after 30 years of service, Ghika became Under Treasurer and Chief Executive at the Middle Temple in July 2023.

Military offices
Preceded by Sir Ben Bathurst	GOC London District; 2019–2023	Succeeded by James Bowder
