= Bertram Sergison-Brooke =

British Army general

Lieutenant-General Sir Bertram Sergison-Brooke KCB KCVO CMG DSO
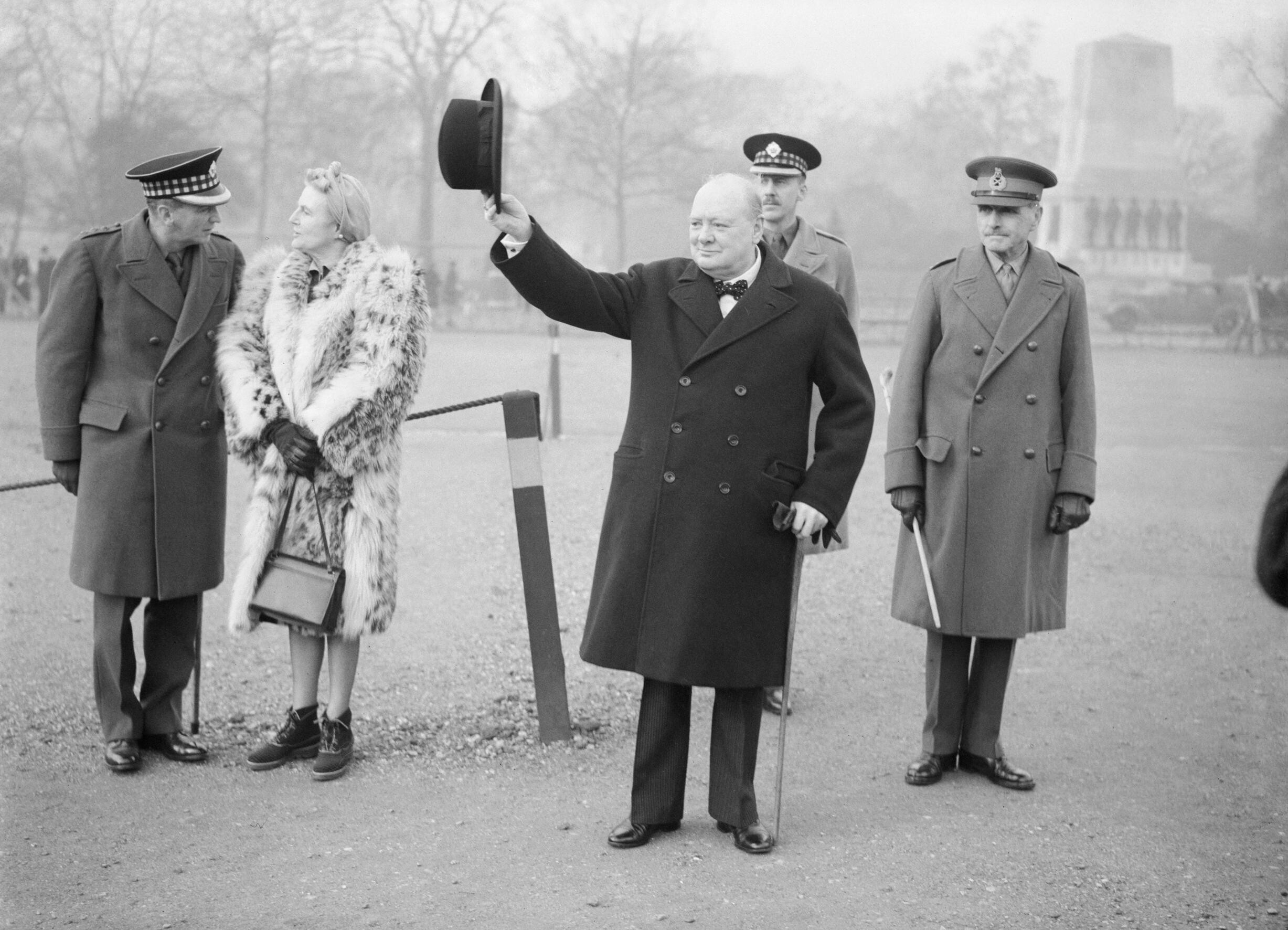
- Sergison-Brooke (right) with Churchill in London, January 1941
- Born: 20 July 1880; St George Hanover Square, London
- Died: 26 March 1967 (aged 86); Brackley, Northamptonshire, England
- Burial place: Lower Swell, Gloucestershire, England
- Relatives: Alan Brooke, 1st Viscount Alanbrooke (cousin)
- Military career
- Allegiance: United Kingdom
- Branch: British Army
- Service years: 1899–1942
- Rank: Lieutenant-General
- Nickname: "Bertie"
- Service number: 12773
- Unit: Grenadier Guards
- Commands: London District (1934–1938, 1939–1942); 1st (Guards) Brigade (1928–1931); 15th Infantry Brigade (1927); Grenadier Guards (1923–1927); 1st Battalion, Grenadier Guards (1919–1923); 2nd Guards Brigade (1917–1919); 3rd Battalion, Grenadier Guards (1916)
- Conflicts: Second Boer War; First World War; Second World War
- Awards: Knight Commander of the Order of the Bath; Knight Commander of the Royal Victorian Order; Companion of the Order of St Michael and St George; Distinguished Service Order; Mentioned in Despatches (7); Order of the Crown (Belgium); Legion of Honour (France)

Lieutenant-General Sir Bertram Norman Sergison-Brooke, KCB, KCVO, CMG, DSO (born Brooke; 20 July 1880 – 26 March 1967) was an Anglo-Irish senior British Army officer who served as Major-General commanding the Brigade of Guards and General Officer Commanding (GOC) London District.

== Early life and education ==
Brooke was born in London, the fourth son of Arthur Basil Brooke and Alice Georgina Norton. He was a grandson of Sir Arthur Brooke, 2nd Baronet and a cousin of Alan Brooke, 1st Viscount Alanbrooke. The Brookes were a prominent Anglo-Irish family that had been settled in Northern Ireland since prior to the Plantation of Ulster. He was educated at Eton College and passed out of the Royal Military College, Sandhurst in 1899.

== Military career ==
Brooke was commissioned into the Grenadier Guards as a second lieutenant on 12 August 1899.

He served in the Second Boer War in South Africa, which began later that year, and was promoted to lieutenant on 14 December 1900. Following the end of the war in June 1902 he returned with most of the men of the guards regiments on board the SS Lake Michigan, which arrived in Southampton in October 1902. He then served with the Egyptian Army.

Brooke, by now a supernumerary captain, was restored to the establishment on 3 November 1910.

Brooke also served in the First World War, initially as Assistant Embarkation Officer in Southampton and then as a Charles Corkran's successor as brigade major of the 1st (Guards) Brigade in November 1914 and the same role later on. in France. By September 1917 he was a temporary brigadier general commanding the 2nd Guards Brigade, taking over from John Ponsonby, but was gassed on the Western Front. He was mentioned in despatches seven times throughout the war and was promoted in January 1918 to brevet lieutenant colonel.

After the war Brooke became commanding officer of the 1st Battalion Grenadier Guards and then, in 1923, went on to be commander of the Grenadier Guards and Regimental District. He was appointed commander of the 15th Infantry Brigade in China in 1927 and then, after promotion to temporary colonel commandant, commander of the 1st (Guards) Brigade at Aldershot in April 1928. He was made Brigadier on the General Staff at Eastern Command in India in 1931 and Major-General commanding the Brigade of Guards and General Officer Commanding London District in 1934. He was made a Companion of the Order of the Bath in June 1935.

He retired from the army in 1939 but, with the Second World War underway, he was recalled as GOC London District. He retired again in 1942.

Brooke was British Red Cross Commissioner with the Allied Army of Liberation from 1943 to 1945.

== Personal life ==
In 1915, Brooke married Prudence Ida Evelyn Sergison, daughter and co-heiress of Charles Warden Sergison of Cuckfield Park, and assumed her surname by royal licence. They had one daughter, Patience Ann (born 1916), who married Sir Edward Henry Windley.

After Prudence's death in 1918, Brooke married secondly Hilda Fenwick, in 1923. They had one son, Timothy Mark, who married the Hon. Mary Anne Hare, daughter of John Hare, 1st Viscount Blakenham. His second wife died in 1954.

Brooke's home was in Slaugham in West Sussex.

== Bibliography ==
- Davies, Frank (1997). Bloody Red Tabs: General Officer Casualties of the Great War 1914–1918. London: Pen & Sword Books. ISBN 9781783462377.

Military offices
Preceded by Sir Charles Grant	GOC London District; 1934–1938	Succeeded by Sir Andrew Thorne
Preceded by Sir Andrew Thorne	GOC London District; 1939–1942	Succeeded by Sir Arthur Smith
