= Major-General commanding the Household Division =

Commander of ceremonial military units in London

Major General Commanding the Household Division
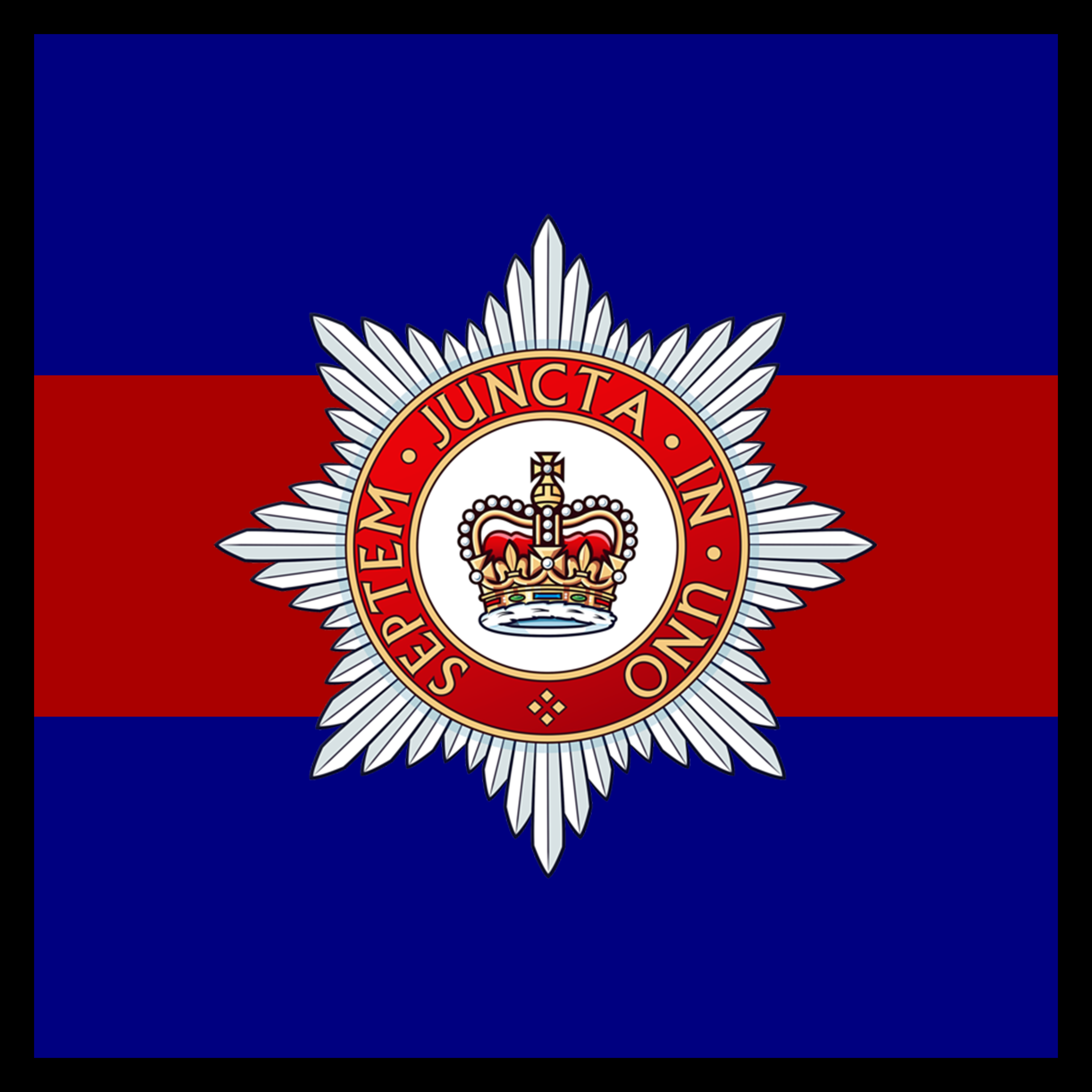
- Incumbent; Major-General Mark Berry since November 2026
- British Army; London District
- Style: Major General
- Abbreviation: MGHD
- Reports to: The Monarch
- Seat: Horse Guards
- Nominator: Defence Services Secretary
- Appointer: The Monarch
- Term length: 3–4 years
- Unofficial names: General Officer Commanding London District

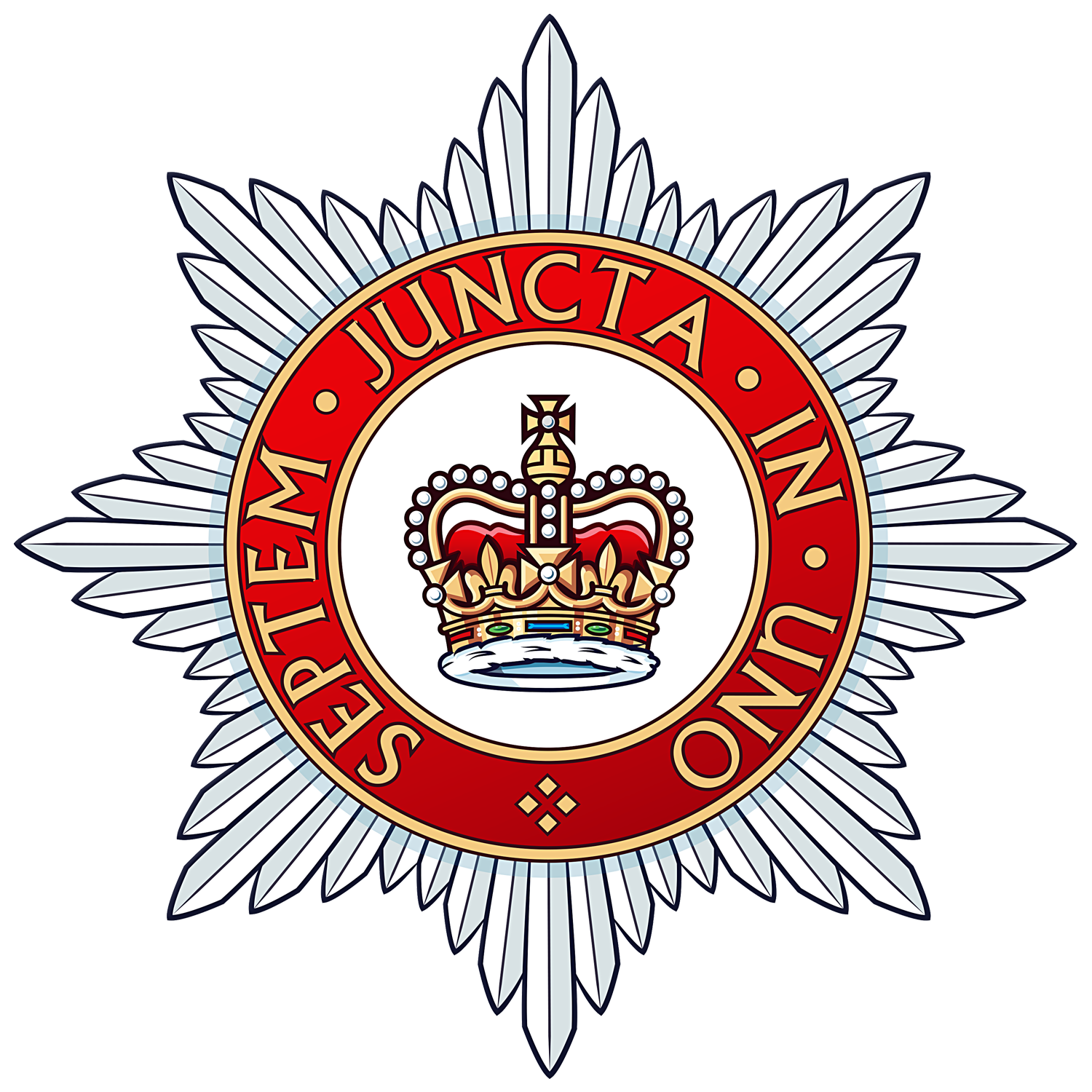
Badge of the Household Division

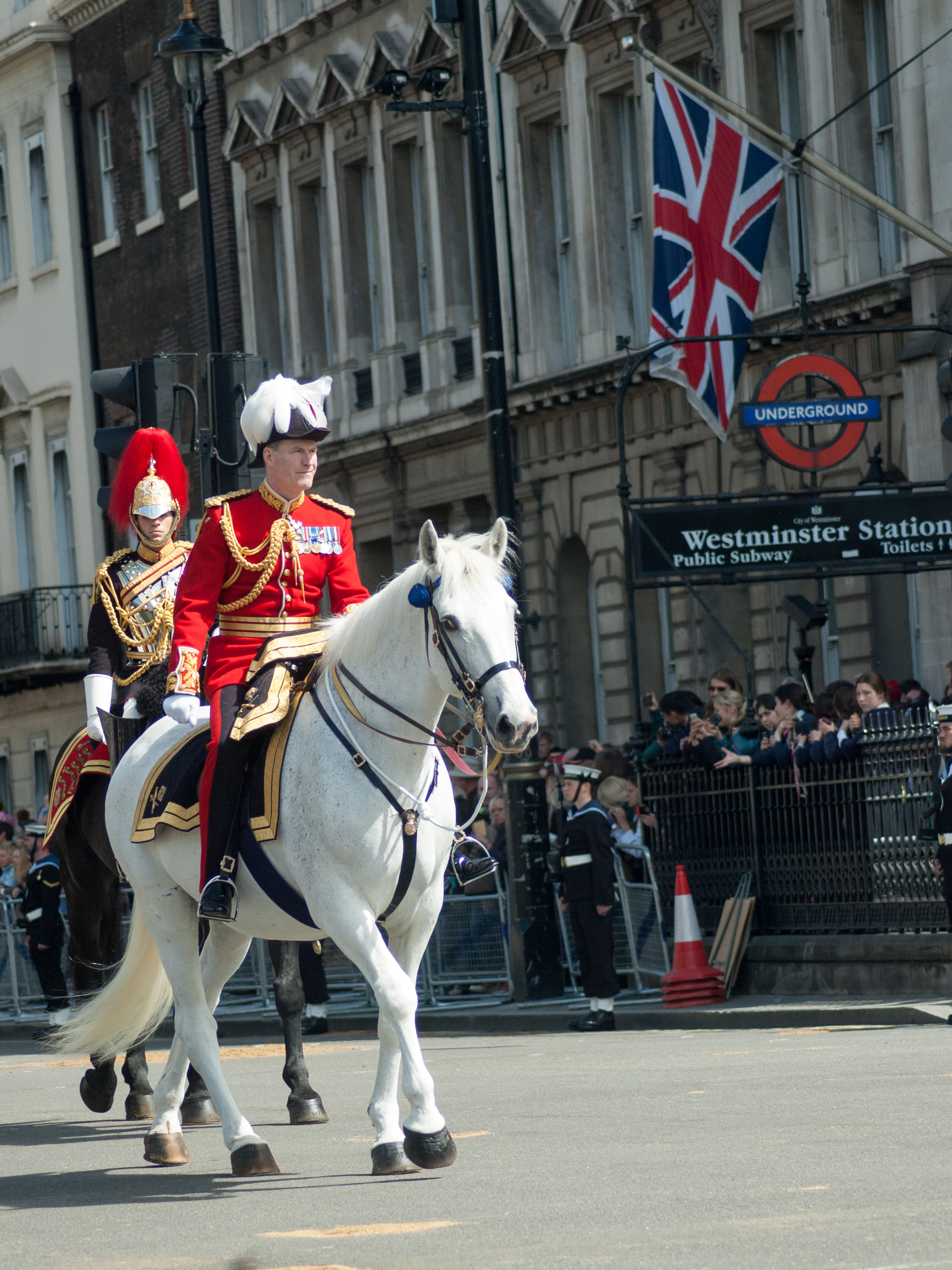
Edward Smyth-Osbourne in the full-dress uniform of a Major-General, on duty at the State Opening of Parliament in 2015

The Major-General commanding the Household Division commands the Household Division of the British Army and is also the General Officer Commanding London District. In British Army parlance, "The Major-General" always refers to the Major-General commanding the Household Division. The Major-General has sole responsibility for the Service aspect of all State and ceremonial occasions within London District. The office holds executive command of the Household Division and of any other units brought into London for providing military security to the Sovereign, the Royal Palaces as well as for ceremonial purposes and is the main channel of communication between the Household Division and the Monarch. He or she is appointed by The Sovereign, and will previously have commanded a Regiment or Battalion within the Household Division.

== History ==
The appointment dates from 14 July 1856, when an order was issued conveying the news that "Her Majesty has been pleased to appoint Major-General Lord Rokeby, KCB, to serve on the Staff of the army, with a view to his exercising a general supervision over the Battalions [of Guards] in England, including those at Aldershot; all communications having reference to the Brigade of Guards will be addressed to him in future, instead of the Field Officer in Brigade Waiting as heretofore".

When the Home District (the forerunner of London District) was created in 1870, it, too, was placed under the authority of the Major-General, an arrangement that has remained in place ever since.

== Staff ==
The Major General's Staff include the Chief of Staff London District, who deputises in the Major-General's absence, and the principal staff officer of the Household Division (known by his historic title of Brigade Major), who assists the Major General and is "responsible to the Major General for the day to day running of the Public Duties and Household Division matters worldwide".

== List of Commanders ==
The holders of this office include:

=== Commanding Home District ===
- General Prince Adolphus, Duke of Cambridge 1804–

=== Major-General Commanding the Brigade of Guards (1856–1870) ===
Before 1856, orders for the Foot Guards were communicated to the Field Officer in Brigade Waiting, a rotational appointment.

- Major-General Henry Robinson-Montagu, 6th Baron Rokeby 1856–1861
- Major-General James Robertson Craufurd 1861–1863
- Major-General Lord Frederick Paulet 1863–1867
- Major-General James Alexander Lindsay 1867–1868
- Major-General Frederick William Hamilton 1868–1870

=== Major-General Commanding the Brigade of Guards and General Officer Commanding Home District (1870–1906) ===
- Major-General Prince Edward of Saxe-Weimar 1870–1876 late Grenadier Guards
- Major-General Sir Frederick Stephenson 1876–1879 late Scots Guards
- Major-General Sir George Higginson 1879–1884 late Grenadier Guards
- Major-General Sir Reginald Gipps 1884–1889 late Scots Guards
- Major-General Philip Smith 1889–1892 late Grenadier Guards
- Major-General Paul Methuen, 3rd Baron Methuen 1892–1897 late Scots Guards
- Major-General Sir Henry Trotter 1897–1903 late Grenadier Guards
- Major-General Sir Laurence Oliphant, 1903–1906 late Grenadier Guards

=== Major-General Commanding the Brigade of Guards and General Officer Commanding London District (1906–1950) ===
- Major-General Sir Frederick Stopford, 1906–1909 late Grenadier Guards
- Major-General Sir Alfred Codrington, 1909–1913 late Coldstream Guards
- Lieutenant-General Sir Francis Lloyd 1913–1918 late Grenadier Guards
- Major-General Sir Geoffrey Feilding 1918–1920 late Coldstream Guards
- Major-General Sir George Jeffreys 1920–1924 late Grenadier Guards
- Major-General Walter Hore-Ruthven, 10th Lord Ruthven of Freeland, 1924–1928 late Scots Guards
- Major-General Sir Charles Corkran, 1928–1932 late Grenadier Guards
- Major-General Albemarle Cator, April – November 1932 late Scots Guards
- Major-General Sir Charles Grant, 1932–1934 late Coldstream Guards
- Major-General Sir Bertram Sergison-Brooke, 1934–1938 late Grenadier Guards
- Lieutenant-General Sir Andrew Thorne, 1938–1939 late Grenadier Guards
- Lieutenant-General Sir Bertram Sergison-Brooke, 1939–1942 late Grenadier Guards
- Lieutenant-General Sir Arthur Smith, 1942–1944 late Coldstream Guards
- Lieutenant-General Sir Charles Loyd, 1944–1947 late Coldstream Guards
- Major-General Sir John Marriott, 1947–1950 late Scots Guards

=== Major-General Commanding the Household Brigade and General Officer Commanding London District (1950–1968) ===
- Major-General Sir Julian Gascoigne, 1950–1953 late Grenadier Guards
- Major-General Sir George Johnson, 1953–1957 late Scots Guards
- Major-General Sir Rodney Moore, 1957–1959 late Grenadier Guards
- Major-General Sir George Burns, 1959–1962 late Coldstream Guards
- Major-General Sir John Nelson, 1962–1965 late Grenadier Guards
- Major-General Sir Basil Eugster, 1965–1968 late Irish Guards

=== Major-General Commanding the Household Division and General Officer Commanding London District (1968–) ===
- Major-General Lord Michael Fitzalan-Howard, 1968–1971 late The Life Guards
- Major-General Sir James Bowes-Lyon, 1971–1973 late Grenadier Guards
- Major-General Sir Philip Ward, 1973–1976 late Welsh Guards
- Major-General Sir John Swinton, 1976–1979 late Scots Guards
- Major-General Sir Desmond Langley, 1979–1983 late The Life Guards
- Major-General Sir James Eyre, 1983–1986 late Royal Horse Guards
- Major-General Sir Christopher Airy, 1986–1989 late Scots Guards
- Major-General Sir Simon Cooper, 1989–1991 late The Life Guards
- Major-General Sir Robert Corbett, 1991–1994 late Irish Guards
- Major-General Sir Iain Mackay-Dick, 1994–1997 late Scots Guards
- Major-General Sir Evelyn Webb-Carter, 1997–2000 late Grenadier Guards
- Major-General Sir Redmond Watt, 2000–2003 late Welsh Guards
- Major-General Sir Sebastian Roberts, 2003–2007 late Irish Guards
- Major-General Sir William Cubitt, 2007–2011 late Irish Guards 1998–2011 (commissioned into Coldstream Guards, 1977–1998)
- Major-General Sir George Norton, 2011–2013 late Grenadier Guards
- Major-General Sir Edward Smyth-Osbourne, 2013–2016 late The Life Guards
- Major-General Sir Ben Bathurst, 2016–2019 late Welsh Guards
- Major General Sir Chris Ghika, 2019–2023 late Irish Guards
- Major General Sir James Bowder, 2023–2026 late Grenadier Guards
- Major General Mark Berry, 2026 – present late The Life Guards
