= HMS Ariadne (F72) =

Type 12I or Leander-class frigate of the Royal Navy and Chilean Navy

- HMS Ariadne

History

United Kingdom
- Name: HMS Ariadne
- Operator: Royal Navy
- Builder: Yarrow Shipbuilders
- Laid down: 1 November 1969
- Launched: 10 September 1971
- Commissioned: 10 February 1973
- Decommissioned: May 1992
- Identification: Pennant number: F72
- Fate: Sold to Chile, 1992

Chile
- Name: General Baquedano
- Namesake: Manuel Baquedano
- Operator: Chilean Navy
- Commissioned: 1992
- Decommissioned: December 1998
- Fate: Sunk as target in 2004

General characteristics
- Class & type: Leander-class frigate
- Displacement: 3,200 long tons (3,251 t) full load
- Length: 113.4 m (372 ft)
- Beam: 12.5 m (41 ft)
- Draught: 5.8 m (19 ft)
- Propulsion: 2 × Babcock & Wilcox boilers supplying steam to two sets of White-English Electric double-reduction geared turbines to two shafts
- Speed: 28 knots (52 km/h)
- Range: 4,600 nautical miles (8,500 km) at 15 knots (28 km/h)
- Complement: 223
- Armament: As built: 1 × twin 4.5 inch (114 mm) guns; 1 × quadruple Sea Cat anti-aircraft missile launchers; 1 × Limbo anti-submarine mortar
- Aircraft carried: 1 × Westland Wasp helicopter

HMS Ariadne was a Leander-class frigate of the Royal Navy. She was launched in 1971, was sold to Chile in 1992 and sunk as a target hulk in 2004.

== Construction ==
Ariadne was one of two Leander-class frigates ordered from Yarrow Shipbuilders as part of the 1967–68 construction programme for the Royal Navy, the last two ships of the class with the order announced on 29 July 1968. Ariadne was laid down at Yarrow's Scotstoun shipyard on 1 November 1969, and was launched on 10 September 1971 and completed on 10 February 1973, commissioning on 2 March 1973 at Devonport. She was the last of the Leander class to be completed. Like the rest of the Leander class, she was named after a figure of Greek mythology; Ariadne was the daughter of King Minos of Crete. She was the eighth ship of that name to serve with the Royal Navy.

Ariadne was a Batch 3, "broad-beamed" Leander, and as such was 372 feet (113.4 m) long overall and 360 feet (109.7 m) at the waterline, with a beam of 43 feet (13.1 m) and a maximum draught of 19 feet (5.8 m). Displacement was 2,500 long tons (2,500 t) standard and 2,962 long tons (3,010 t) full load. Two oil-fired boilers fed steam at 550 pounds per square inch (3,800 kPa) and 850 °F (454 °C) to a pair of double reduction geared steam turbines that in turn drove two propeller shafts, with the machinery rated at 30,000 shaft horsepower (22,000 kW), giving a speed of 28 knots (52 km/h; 32 mph). She had a range of 4,000 nautical miles (4,600 mi; 7,400 km) at 15 knots (17 mph; 28 km/h) or 1,000 nautical miles (1,200 mi; 1,900 km) at top speed.

A twin 4.5-inch (113 mm) Mark 6 gun mount was fitted forward. A single Sea Cat surface-to-air missile launcher was fitted aft on the helicopter hangar roof, while two Oerlikon 20mm cannon provided close-in defence. A Limbo anti-submarine mortar was fitted aft to provide a short-range anti-submarine capability, while a hangar and helicopter deck allowed a Westland Wasp helicopter to be operated, for longer range anti-submarine and anti-surface operations. Ariadne was fitted with a large Type 965 long range air search radar on the ship's mainmast, with a Type 993 short range air/surface target indicating radar and Type 978 navigation radar carried on the ship's foremast. An MRS3 fire control system was carried to direct the 4.5-inch guns. The ship had a sonar suite of Type 184 medium range search sonar, Type 162 bottom search and Type 170 attack sonar, together with a Type 199 variable depth sonar (VDS). She had a crew of 260 officers and other ranks.

== Royal Navy ==
In the year of her commission, Ariadne undertook a fishery protection patrol during the Second Cod War with Iceland.

From January to October 1974, Ariadne in company with the guided missile destroyer Fife (FOF2 embarked), Apollo, Argonaut, Danae, Londonderry and Scylla supported by oilers Tidespring and Tidereach and the stores ship Tarbatness, made a nine-month deployment to the Far East, visiting Singapore, Hong Kong, Australia, New Zealand, Mauritius, South Africa and Gibraltar. Ariadne participated in the Beira Patrol. She also refuelled from an old oiler permanently moored at Gan in the Indian Ocean. Between 1975 and 1976 she was commanded by Captain Benjamin Bathurst.

In 1976, Ariadne completed a refit at Devonport, and the following year took part in the annual group deployment, visiting a variety of ports in South America and West Africa, as well as performing naval exercises.

In 1977, Galatea also took part in the Fleet Review, in honour of Queen Elizabeth II's Silver Jubilee. Ariadne was part of the 7th Frigate Squadron. Following the Silver Jubilee Review, Ariadne was appointed guardship at Belize. From May to August 1979, Ariadne served as part of Standing Naval Force Atlantic (STANAVFORLANT), a NATO multi-national squadron.

Ariadne was intended for modernisation, which would have included the removal of her one 4.5-in Mk.6 gun, which would have been replaced by the Exocet anti-ship missile, as well as the addition of the Sea Wolf missile, but the 1981 Defence Review by the defence minister John Nott, cancelled the modernisation for Ariadne and other Batch III Leander-class frigates. In 1981 Ariadne became the West Indies Guard Ship and, while there, performed a variety of duties in that region.

In 1983 she shadowed the Soviet cruiser Slava. It was a common practice during the Cold War, with Soviet warships quite often shadowing Royal Navy vessels in return. In 1987 Ariadne joined the 6th Frigate Squadron.

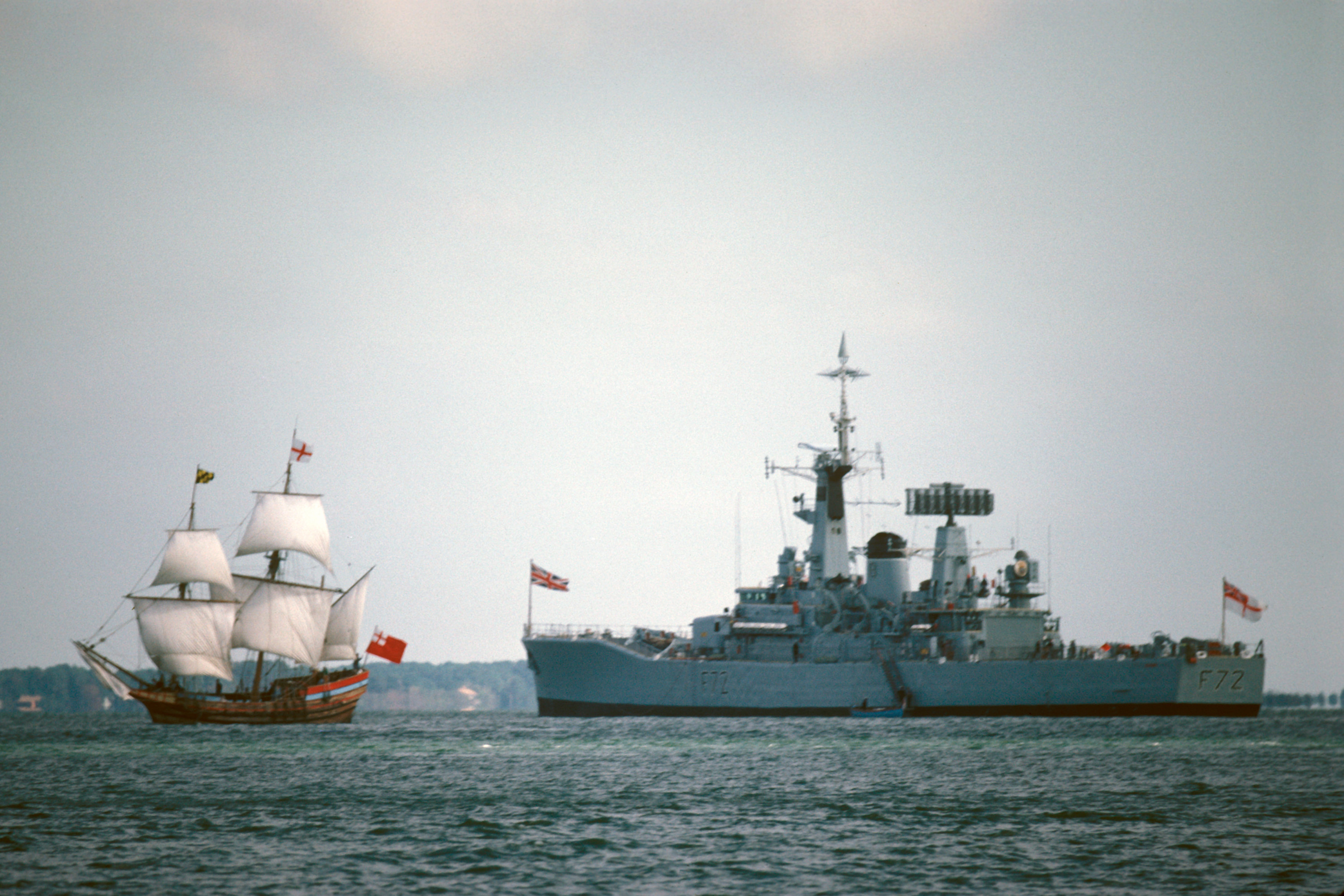
HMS Ariadne off Yorktown, Virginia, in 1981

Ariadne came out of refit in Rosyth Dockyard, Fife, Scotland in 1989 and replaced HMS Juno in the Dartmouth Training Squadron.

In 1990, in consort with HM ships Bristol and Minerva, she took part in Endeavour '90, a six-month circumnavigation of the globe. During this deployment she travelled 32,000 miles. Between 1988 and 1990 she was commanded by Commander Adrian Johns.

Ariadne was formally adopted by Scunthorpe Borough Council on 8 March 1973. The ship's anchor is still located outside the now North Lincolnshire Council's civic centre, and the ship's bell is situated outside the council chamber inside the same building.

== Chilean Navy ==
Ariadne was finally decommissioned by the Royal Navy in May 1992 and was subsequently sold to Chile, being renamed General Baquedano. She was decommissioned from the Chilean Navy in December 1998 and sunk as target in 2004.

== Bibliography ==
- Blackman, Raymond V. B., ed. (1971). Jane's Fighting Ships 1971–72. London: Sampson Low Marston & Co., Ltd. ISBN 0-354-00096-9.
- Colledge, J. J.; Warlow, Ben (2006) [1969]. Ships of the Royal Navy: The Complete Record of All Fighting Ships of the Royal Navy from the 15th Century to the Present (3rd Rev ed.). London: Chatham Publishing. ISBN 978-1-86176-281-8. OCLC 67375475.
- Critchley, Mike (1992). British Warships Since 1945: Part 5: Frigates. Liskeard, UK: Maritime Press. ISBN 0-907771-13-0.
- Friedman, Norman (2008). British Destroyers & Frigates: The Second World War and After. Barnsley, UK: Seaforth Publishing. ISBN 978-1-84832-015-4.
- Manning, T. D.; Walker, C. F. (1959). British Warship Names. London: Putnam.
- Marriott, Leo (1983). Royal Navy Frigates 1945–1983. Shepperton, Surrey, UK: Ian Allan Ltd. ISBN 0-7110-1322-5.
- Osborne, Richard; Sowdon, David (1990). Leander Class Frigates. Kendal, UK: World Ships Society. ISBN 0-905617-56-8.
- Roberts, John (2009). Safeguarding the Nation: The Story of the Modern Royal Navy. Annapolis, Maryland, US: Naval Institute Press. ISBN 978-1-59114-812-8.
