= Mark Berry (British Army officer) =

British Army general

Major General Mark Berry
- Military career
- Allegiance: United Kingdom
- Branch: British Army
- Service years: 1999–present
- Rank: Major General
- Unit: Life Guards
- Commands: Household Cavalry Regiment; 16 Air Assault Brigade; London District; Household Division
- Conflicts: War in Afghanistan
- Awards: Queen's Commendation for Valuable Service; US Legion of Merit

Major General Mark Simon Peter Berry, is a senior British Army officer. He serves as General Officer Commanding, London District and the Major-General commanding the Household Division.

== Military career ==
Following training at the Royal Military Academy Sandhurst, Berry was commissioned into the Life Guards on 7 August 1999. He became commanding officer of the Household Cavalry Regiment in 2018, commander of 16 Air Assault Brigade in 2023 and General Officer Commanding, London District and the Major-General commanding the Household Division in November 2026.

Berry was awarded the Queen's Commendation for Valuable Service for services in Afghanistan on 23 March 2012. He was also awarded the United States Legion of Merit in December 2025.

Military offices
Preceded by James Bowder	GOC London District; 2026–Present	Incumbent
