= Benjamin Bathurst (Royal Navy officer) =

Royal Navy Admiral of the Fleet (1936–2025)

Admiral of the Fleet Sir Benjamin Bathurst GCB DL
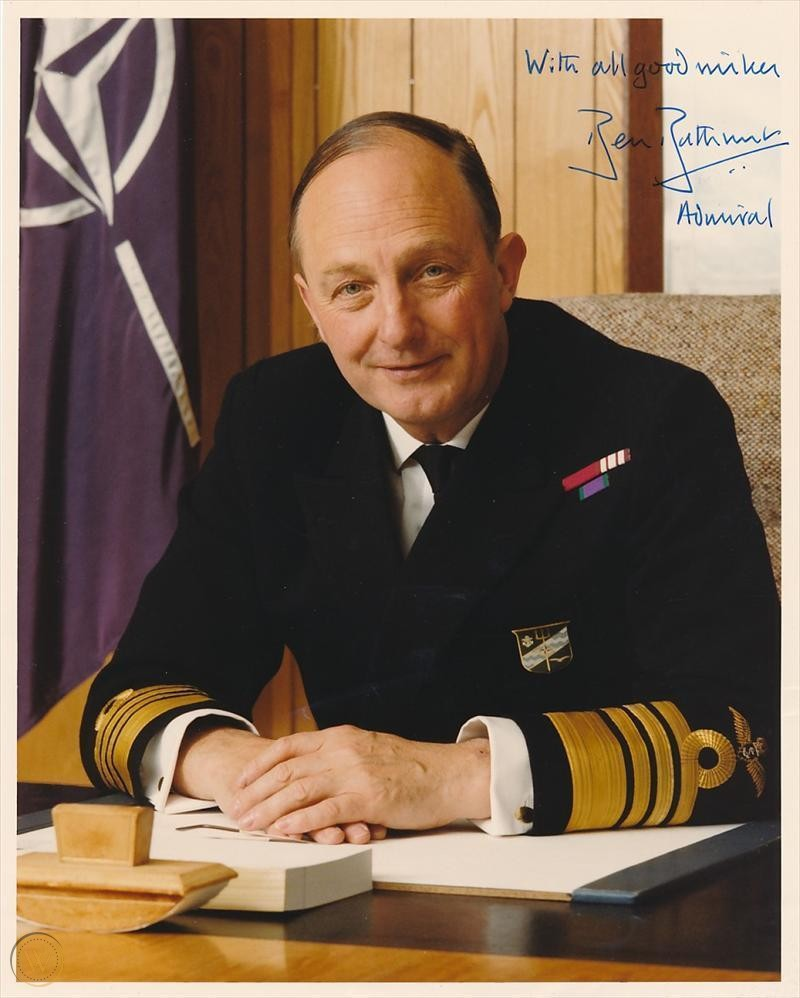
- Bathurst as an Admiral
- Born: 27 May 1936; London, England
- Died: 12 October 2025 (aged 89); Gibraltar
- Relatives: Lieutenant General Sir Ben Bathurst (son)
- Military career
- Allegiance: United Kingdom
- Branch: Royal Navy
- Service years: 1953–1995
- Rank: Admiral of the Fleet
- Commands: First Sea Lord; Vice-Chief of the Defence Staff; Commander-in-Chief Fleet; Chief of Fleet Support; Director-General, Naval Manpower and Training; Flag Officer, Second Flotilla; Naval Assistant to the First Sea Lord; Director of Naval Air Warfare; HMS Minerva; HMS Ariadne; 819 Naval Air Squadron
- Conflicts: Bosnian War
- Awards: Knight Grand Cross of the Order of the Bath

Admiral of the Fleet Sir David Benjamin Bathurst, GCB, DL (27 May 1936 – 12 October 2025) was a British Royal Navy officer. After training as a pilot and qualifying as a helicopter instructor, Bathurst commanded a naval air squadron and then two frigates before achieving higher command in the navy. He served as First Sea Lord and Chief of the Naval Staff from 1993 to 1995: in that capacity he advised the British Government on the deployment of naval support including Sea Harriers during the Bosnian War.

== Early life ==
Bathurst was born in London on 27 May 1936; the son of Peter Bathurst and his wife Lady Elizabeth Ann Bathurst (née Temple-Gore-Langton). Generally known by his middle name of Benjamin, Bathurst was educated at Eton College and Britannia Royal Naval College, Dartmouth.

== Naval career ==
Bathurst joined the Royal Navy as a cadet in 1953 and became a midshipman on 1 September 1955. During his early career he served in the minesweeper HMS Woolaston and, following promotion to sub-lieutenant on 1 January 1957 and to lieutenant on 1 February 1959, he qualified as a pilot in 1960. He next served in the ship's flight on the destroyer HMS Devonshire and then qualified as a helicopter instructor in 1964. He served as an exchange officer with the Royal Australian Navy in 1965 and, following promotion to lieutenant commander on 1 February 1967, he became senior pilot of 820 Naval Air Squadron on the aircraft carrier HMS Eagle. He was given command of 819 Naval Air Squadron in February 1969 and then joined the Directorate of Naval Recruiting at the Ministry of Defence in early 1970. Promoted to commander on 30 June 1970, he became executive officer on the destroyer HMS Norfolk in February 1971. He joined the Directorate of Naval Air Warfare at the Ministry of Defence in February 1973.

Promoted to captain on 31 December 1974, Bathurst took command of a Leander-class frigate, HMS Ariadne in March 1975. He became Naval Assistant to the First Sea Lord in May 1976 and Commanding Officer of HMS Minerva as well as Captain of the 5th Frigate Squadron in September 1978. He attended the Royal College of Defence Studies in 1981 and became Director of Naval Air Warfare at the Ministry of Defence in January 1982.

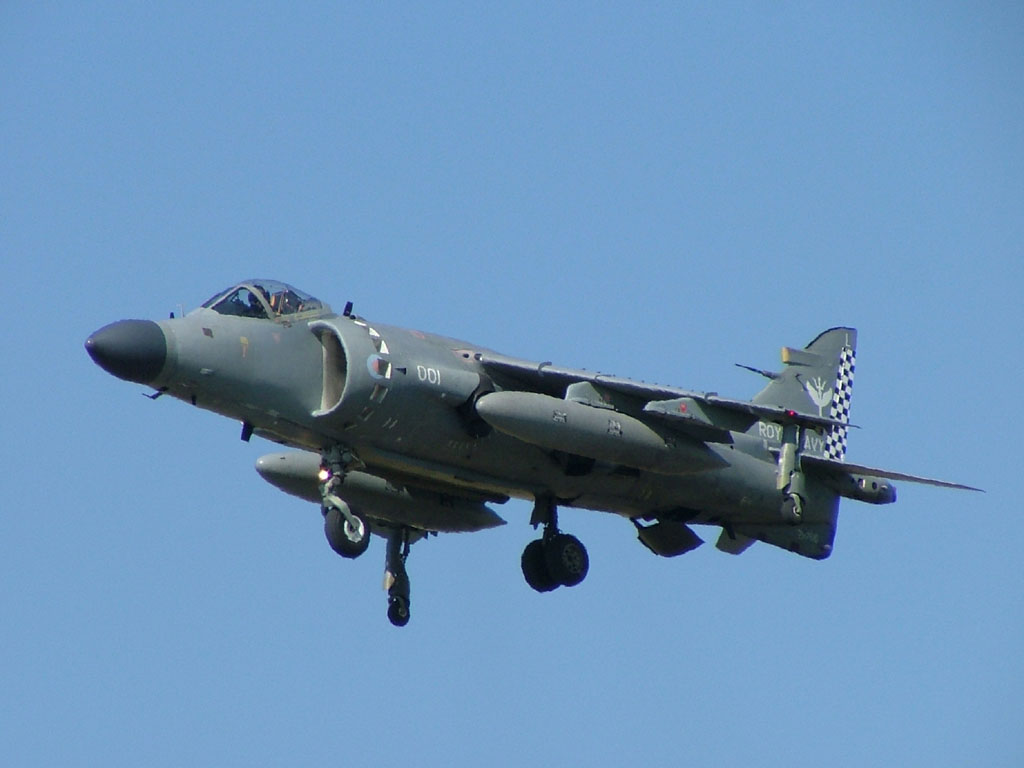
Sea Harrier, an aircraft type deployed by Bathurst during the Bosnian War

Promoted to rear admiral on 10 October 1983, on appointment as Flag Officer, Second Flotilla, Bathurst went on to be Director-General, Naval Manpower and Training at the Ministry of Defence in May 1985. He was promoted to vice admiral on 22 December 1986, on appointment as Chief of Fleet Support. He was appointed a Knight Commander of the Order of the Bath in the 1987 Birthday Honours, and promoted to full admiral on 21 April 1989, on appointment as Commander-in-Chief Fleet which also carried with it the NATO appointments of Commander-in-Chief, Channel and Commander-in-Chief, Eastern Atlantic. Advanced to Knight Grand Cross of the Order of the Bath in the 1991 New Year Honours, he became Vice-Chief of the Defence Staff in March 1991 and First Sea Lord and Chief of Naval Staff in March 1993. As First Sea Lord he advised the British Government on the deployment of Naval Support including Sea Harriers during the Bosnian War. He was promoted to Admiral of the Fleet on 10 July 1995 on his retirement.

== Later career ==
In retirement Bathurst became a non-executive director of British International Helicopters. He was appointed a deputy lieutenant of Somerset on 27 August 1996 and became vice-lord lieutenant on 18 February 1999. He was a younger brother of Trinity House and a liveryman of the Honourable Company of Air Pilots. His interests included gardening, shooting and fishing.

== Personal life and death ==
Bathurst married Sarah Christian Pandora Peto, daughter of Major John Peto and granddaughter of Sir Basil Peto, 1st Baronet, in 1959. They had one son, Lieutenant General Sir Benjamin Bathurst, and three daughters.

Bathurst died on 12 October 2025 at the age of 89 in Gibraltar, where his son, Lieutenant General Sir Ben Bathurst, serves as the governor.

== Sources ==
- Heathcote, Tony (2002). The British Admirals of the Fleet 1734–1995. Pen & Sword Ltd. ISBN 0-85052-835-6.
- Mosley, Charles (1999). Burke's Peerage and Baronetage, 106th edition, volume 1. Crans, Switzerland: Burke's Peerage (Genealogical Books) Ltd. ISBN 978-1579580834.

Military offices
Preceded by Sir Anthony Tippet	Chief of Fleet Support; 1986–1989	Succeeded by Sir Jock Slater
Preceded by Sir Julian Oswald	Commander-in-Chief Fleet; 1989–1991	Succeeded by Sir Jock Slater
Preceded by Sir Richard Vincent	Vice-Chief of the Defence Staff; 1991–1993	Succeeded by Sir Jock Slater
Preceded by Sir Julian Oswald	First Sea Lord; 1993–1995	Succeeded by Sir Jock Slater
