= Jonathan Woodcock =

Royal Navy Vice Admiral (born 1962)

Vice Admiral Sir Jonathan Woodcock KCB OBE
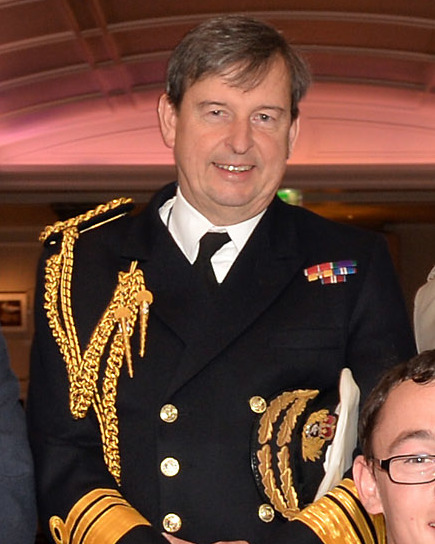
- Vice Admiral Woodcock in 2015
- Born: 5 July 1962 (age 64); Sandown, Isle of Wight
- Military career
- Allegiance: United Kingdom
- Branch: Royal Navy
- Service years: 1984–2018
- Rank: Vice Admiral
- Commands: Second Sea Lord; Naval Secretary; HMS Raleigh; Royal Naval School of Marine Engineering
- Conflicts: Iraq War
- Awards: Knight Commander of the Order of the Bath; Officer of the Order of the British Empire

Vice Admiral Sir Simon Jonathan Woodcock, KCB, OBE (born 5 July 1962) is a retired Royal Navy officer who served as Second Sea Lord from 2015 to 2018.

== Naval career ==
Educated at Ryde School and Britannia Royal Naval College, Woodcock joined the Royal Navy in 1984. He served as Commander (Engineering) in HMS Ark Royal and saw action during Operation Telic as Staff Marine Engineer to the Amphibious Task Group. He went on to be Chief of Staff to the Capability Manager Precision Attack at the Ministry of Defence in December 2003, commanding officer of the Royal Naval School of Marine Engineering in March 2005 and commanding officer of the basic training unit HMS Raleigh in January 2008. After that he became Head of Pay and Manning in the Ministry of Defence in April 2010, Director Naval Personnel at Fleet Headquarters in January 2012 and Naval Secretary in September 2012.

He became Second Sea Lord in March 2015, retiring from the position in March 2018. He retired from the Royal Navy on 30 June 2018.

Woodcock was appointed an Officer of the Order of the British Empire (OBE) in the 2008 Birthday Honours and knighted as a Knight Commander of the Order of the Bath (KCB) in the 2018 New Year Honours.

Military offices
Preceded by David Steel	Naval Secretary; 2012–2015	Succeeded by Simon Williams
Preceded by Sir David Steel	Second Sea Lord; 2015–2018	Succeeded by Tony Radakin
