= David Steel (Royal Navy officer) =

Royal Navy Vice Admiral (born 1961)

Vice Admiral Sir David Steel KBE KStJ DL
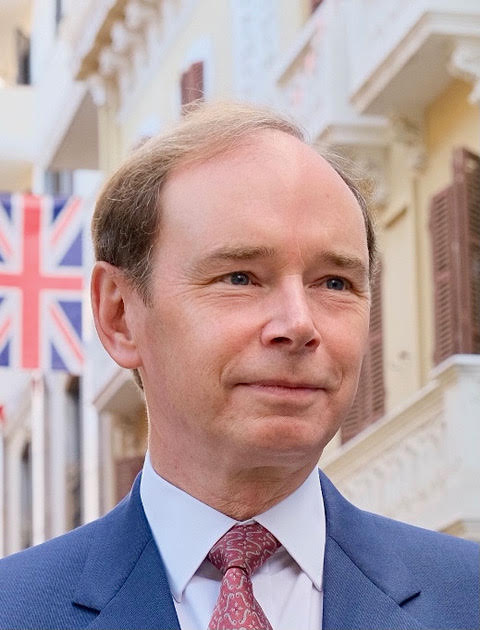
- Steel in 2021

Governor of Gibraltar
- In office 11 June 2020 – 23 May 2024
- Monarchs: Elizabeth II; Charles III
- Chief Minister: Fabian Picardo
- Preceded by: Edward Davis
- Succeeded by: Sir Ben Bathurst

Personal details
- Born: 6 April 1961 (age 65)

Military service
- Allegiance: United Kingdom
- Branch/service: Royal Navy
- Years of service: 1979–2015
- Rank: Vice Admiral
- Commands: Second Sea Lord; Naval Secretary; HM Naval Base Portsmouth
- Battles/wars: Kosovo War
- Awards: Knight Commander of the Order of the British Empire; Queen's Commendation for Valuable Service; Knight of Justice of the Order of St John

Vice Admiral Sir David George Steel, KBE, KStJ, DL (born 6 April 1961) is a retired senior Royal Navy officer who served as Second Sea Lord between 2012 and 2015. He served as Governor of Gibraltar from 2020 to 2024.

== Early life ==
Steel was born on 6 April 1961. He was educated at Rossall School in Lancashire and attended Durham University where he read law, graduating in 1983. He was called to the bar in 1988.

== Military career ==
Steel joined the Royal Navy in 1979. His early career was spent in a variety of sea and shore appointments, including as the Fleet Legal Adviser. In December 1999, while serving in the aircraft carrier HMS Invincible, he was awarded a Queen's Commendation for Valuable Service in support of operations in Kosovo and Macedonia earlier that year. In November 2005 he assumed command of HM Naval Base Portsmouth and in that capacity was honoured for his "inspirational leadership" during the Government's savings review of Naval Bases in 2007. He was also appointed Chief Naval Logistics Officer and Aide-de-Camp to Her Majesty The Queen.

In November 2008 Steel was appointed Director of Service Personnel Policy (Pay and Allowances) at the Ministry of Defence and, in April 2010, he was promoted to rear admiral and appointed Naval Secretary. He was promoted to vice admiral and appointed Second Sea Lord in October 2012.

Already a Commander of the Order of the British Empire (CBE), Steel was appointed a Knight Commander of the Order of the British Empire (KBE) in the 2015 New Year Honours. He was appointed a Knight of the Order of St John (KStJ) on 11 November 2020.

== Later professional life ==
Viceregal styles of Sir David Steel (2020–2024)
- Reference style: His Excellency
- Spoken style: Your Excellency

In 2011 Steel was appointed as a Director of Portsmouth Cultural Trust, a role he held until 2016. In 2015 he became Chief Executive of the Leeds Castle Foundation and Enterprises Limited.

He served as the Governor of Gibraltar from 11 June 2020 to 23 May 2024, and was appointed as an External Member of the House of Lords Conduct Committee in June 2025.

Among his other commitments Steel is a trustee of the Nuffield Trust for the Forces of the Crown, and President and Chairman of Trustees of the Union Jack Club. He is President of the Church of England Soldiers', Sailors' and Airmen's Clubs and Housing Association, Patron of the Boleh Sailing Trust, a vice-president of the Marine Society & Sea Cadets, and an ambassador for the Woodland Trust. He is President of the Royal British Legion Poppy Factory, and a Vice-Patron of Veterans Outreach Support.

He is a Deputy Lieutenant of Hampshire, a Freeman of the City of London, and a Bencher of the Middle Temple.

Military offices
Preceded by Charles Montgomery	Naval Secretary; 2010–2012	Succeeded by Jonathan Woodcock
Preceded by Sir Charles Montgomery	Second Sea Lord; 2012–2015	Succeeded by Sir Jonathan Woodcock
Government offices
Preceded by Edward Davis	Governor of Gibraltar; 2020–2024	Succeeded by Sir Ben Bathurst
