= Field Officer in Brigade Waiting =

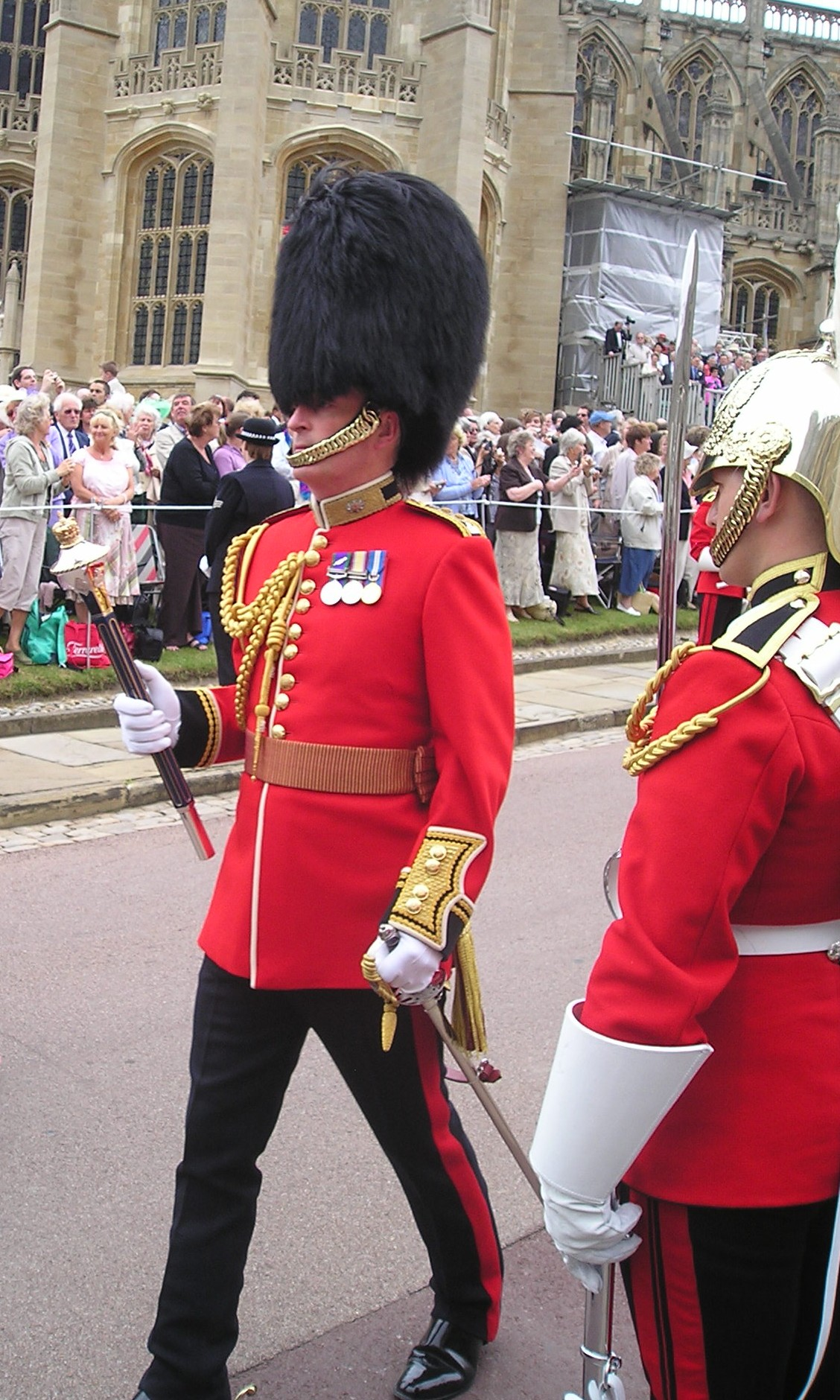
Colonel Jonathan Bourne-May, attending the Queen as Field Officer in Brigade Waiting at the Garter Service (2006).

The Field Officer in Brigade Waiting holds an appointment in the Royal Household. Always a Foot Guards officer, he is required to be in attendance on particular occasions 'to receive the King's commands for the Foot Guards'. Each year, among other duties, the Field Officer in Brigade Waiting commands the King's Birthday Parade mounted on horseback. When dismounted he carries a distinctive baton as his insignia of office.

The appointment (termed Field Officer in Waiting until the mid-19th century) was first instituted in the reign of Queen Anne.

== Appointment ==
The Field Officer in Brigade Waiting is appointed by the Major-General commanding the Household Division. Until the late 1980s (when the command structure of the Guards regiments was altered) the post of Field Officer in Brigade Waiting was held in turn by the Lieutenant-Colonels commanding the five regiments of Foot Guards, each serving a month at a time in rotation. Today, the Major-General's deputy (who is Chief of Staff London District) normally holds the appointment (but if the Chief of Staff is not a Foot Guards Officer, or is unavailable for duty, then the Lieutenant Colonel Foot Guards does so instead).

An exception, however, is made for the King's Birthday Parade (Trooping the Colour), when the Chief of Staff rides with the Major-General; on this occasion it is customary for the Commanding Officer of the Battalion whose colour is being trooped to command the Parade as Field Officer in Brigade Waiting. In 2024 Trooping the Colour was 'led' for the first time by London Central Garrison (formed of the Public Duties Incremental Companies of the Foot Guards); that year and the following year the Commanding Officer, London Central Garrison has served as Field Officer in Brigade Waiting for the Parade.

The Field Officer's principal aide when on duty is termed Adjutant in Brigade Waiting. Historically there was also a Quartermaster-in-Brigade Waiting (each of these officers being provided for a month at a time by the regiment to which the serving Field Officer belonged).

== Duties ==
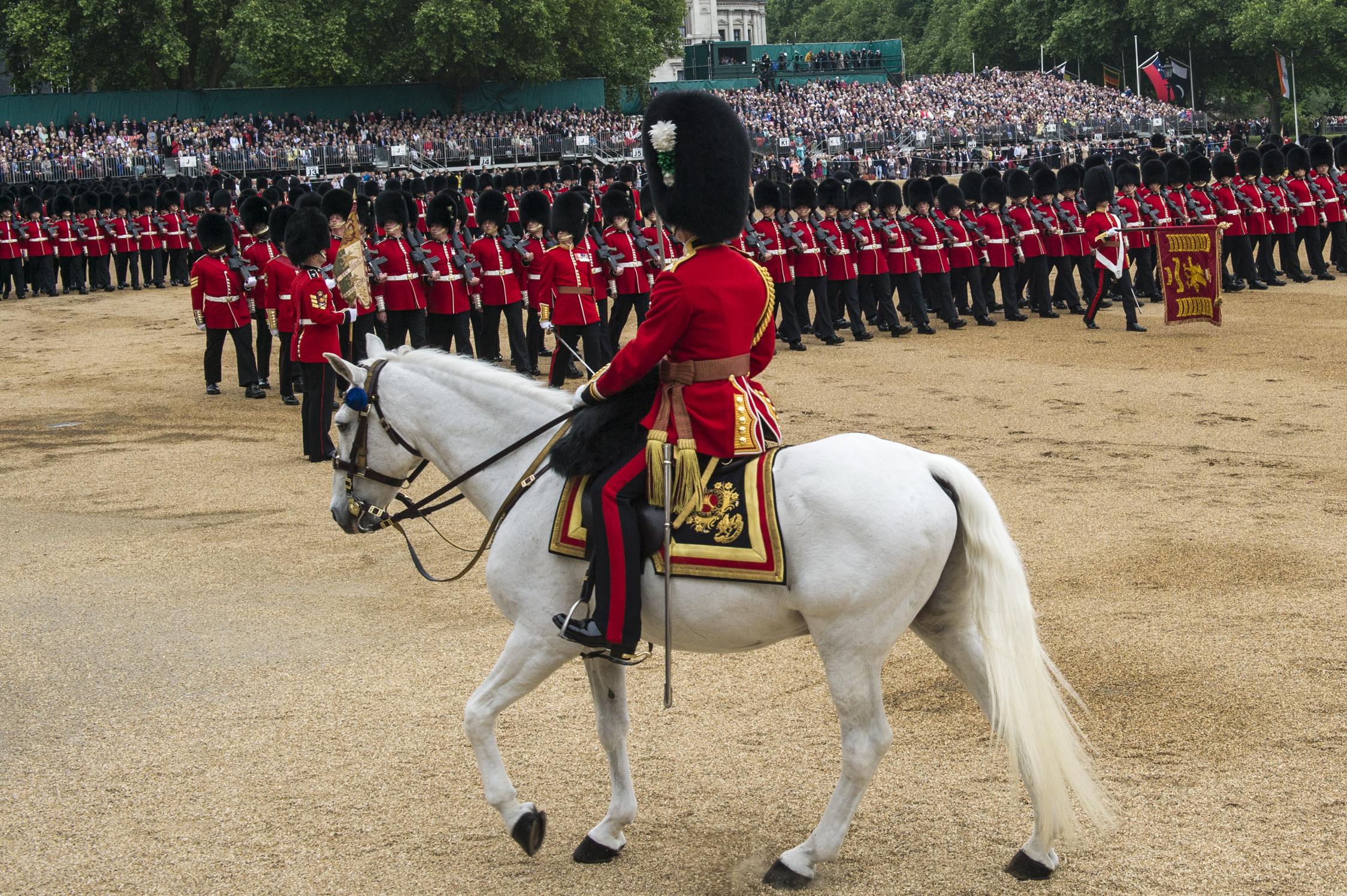
Lt Col. Giles Harris, Commanding Officer 1st Battalion Welsh Guards, commands the Queen's Birthday Parade as Field Officer in Brigade Waiting (2015).

Under the terms of HM Regulations for the Household Division, the Field Officer in Brigade Waiting is to be in attendance on the Sovereign on the following occasions, to receive The King's commands for the Foot Guards:

- When the Sovereign drives in State to open or prorogue Parliament
- During a procession from Windsor Castle and in St George's Chapel following a Chapter of the Garter
- Whenever Guards of Honour are mounted by the Guards Division in the presence of The King

Furthermore, the Field Officer in Brigade Waiting is to command the King's Birthday Parade (assisted by the Major of the Parade and the Adjutant in Brigade Waiting, all three being mounted on horseback).

=== Historical ===
On 9 August 1711 the Secretary at War, George Granville, wrote to 'the Officer in Chief with the two Regiments of Guards' as follows:

Her majesty having thought fit that a Field-Officer of the Foot Guards be always in waiting upon her Royal Person, in like manner as she is attended by an Officer of the Horse Guards, I am commanded to acquaint you with her majesty's pleasure herein, and that she expects compliance therewith as soon as may be.

In the early 18th century the Field Officer in Waiting was primarily responsible for preserving good order and discipline around the Royal Person of the monarch. By the reign of King George II he was expected to wait daily upon the King, to receive orders for the Guards, and as such was viewed as a person of some considerable influence at Court.

By the early 19th century, Field Officer in Waiting was described as 'a monthly duty taken by the field officers of the three regiments of Foot Guards, who attend his Majesty on Court days, to present the detail of this corps, and receive the parole or other orders from him personally, which are afterwards given to the guards in orders'. He was described as having 'the immediate care of his Majesty's person without doors, as the gold stick has of it while in Court', and as such he had command of all the troops on duty.

Following the appointment in 1856 of a Major-General Commanding the Brigade of Guards, the Field Officer in Brigade Waiting was relieved of his de facto command of the Brigade (but continued to fulfil his duties as a member of the Royal Household).

By the 1880s it was well established that 'the three colonels commanding regiments, and the seven lieutenant-colonels commanding battalions, act in turn, for a month at a time, as field officer in waiting' (albeit officers commanding battalions outside London were exempted). The Field Officer's responsibilities were much as they are today, albeit with certain additional duties (for instance he was expected to be in attendance 'when Her Majesty goes in State to the theatres, or to any place of public or private entertainment'). He was also in attendance at drawing-rooms, courts and levées, and on these occasions he would be given an audience of the Queen, 'to deliver the state of the brigade and receive the parole of the day'.

== Insignia of office ==
In common with certain other military officers holding appointments in the Royal Household, the Field Officer in Brigade Waiting is entitled to wear aiguillettes.

A 2-foot baton was commissioned in 1988 following the move to a more permanent pattern of appointment. It consists of a wooden shaft with a silver finial (decorated with the five Foot Guards regimental badges) topped by a crown.

== See also ==
- Silver Stick; a similar Household appointment relating to the Household Cavalry
- Trooping the Colour
