= Frederick William Hamilton =

General Sir Frederick William Hamilton KCB
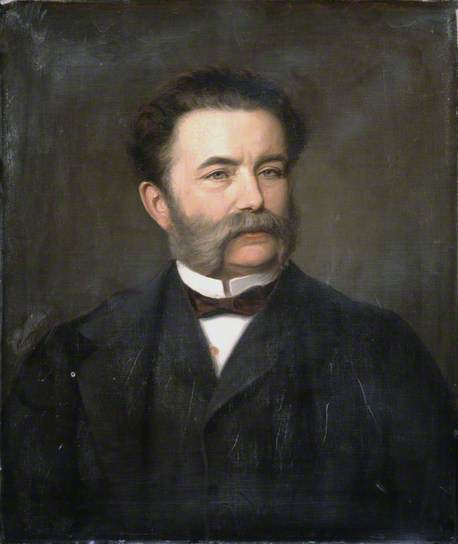
- Born: 8 July 1815; London, England
- Died: 4 October 1890 (aged 75); Colinsburgh, Fife, Scotland
- Burial place: Kilrenny, Fife
- Military career
- Allegiance: United Kingdom
- Branch: British Army
- Service years: 1831–1881
- Rank: General
- Commands: Brigade of Guards; Grenadier Guards
- Conflicts: Crimean War
- Awards: Knight Commander of the Order of the Bath

General Sir Frederick William Hamilton, KCB (8 July 1815 – 4 October 1890) was a British Army officer who served as Major General commanding the Brigade of Guards from 1868 to 1870.

== Early life ==
Hamilton was born in London in 1815, the son of William Richard Hamilton, a diplomat. He was a Page of Honour for George IV from 1826 to 1830 and to William IV from 1830 to 1831.

== Military career ==
Hamilton was commissioned into the Grenadier Guards in 1831. He commanded his regiment throughout the Eastern campaign of the Crimean War, including the Battle of Alma, the Battle of Balaklava, the Battle of Inkerman (during which he was wounded and had his horse shot out from under him) and the Siege of Sebastopol. He then served as Major General commanding the Brigade of Guards from 1868 to 1870, before retiring with the rank of full general on 1 July 1881. He also served as colonel of the Royal Scots Fusiliers from 1870 until his death in 1890.

== Personal life and death ==
In 1860 Hamilton married Louisa Anne Erskine Anstruther, daughter of Sir Alexander Anstruther. Hamilton died aged 75 on 4 October 1890 at Pitcorthie House in Colinsburgh, Fife.

Hamilton died at Pitcorthie in Fife on 4 October 1890 and was buried at the Parish Churchyard in Kilrenny in Fife.

Military offices
Preceded by Sir James Lindsay	Major-General commanding the Brigade of Guards; 1868–1870	Succeeded by Prince Edward of Saxe-Weimar (as GOC Home District)
Preceded by Sir George De Lacy Evans	Colonel of the Royal Scots Fusiliers; 1870–1890	Succeeded by Sir Frederick Haines
