= Gold Stick and Silver Stick =

British bodyguard positions

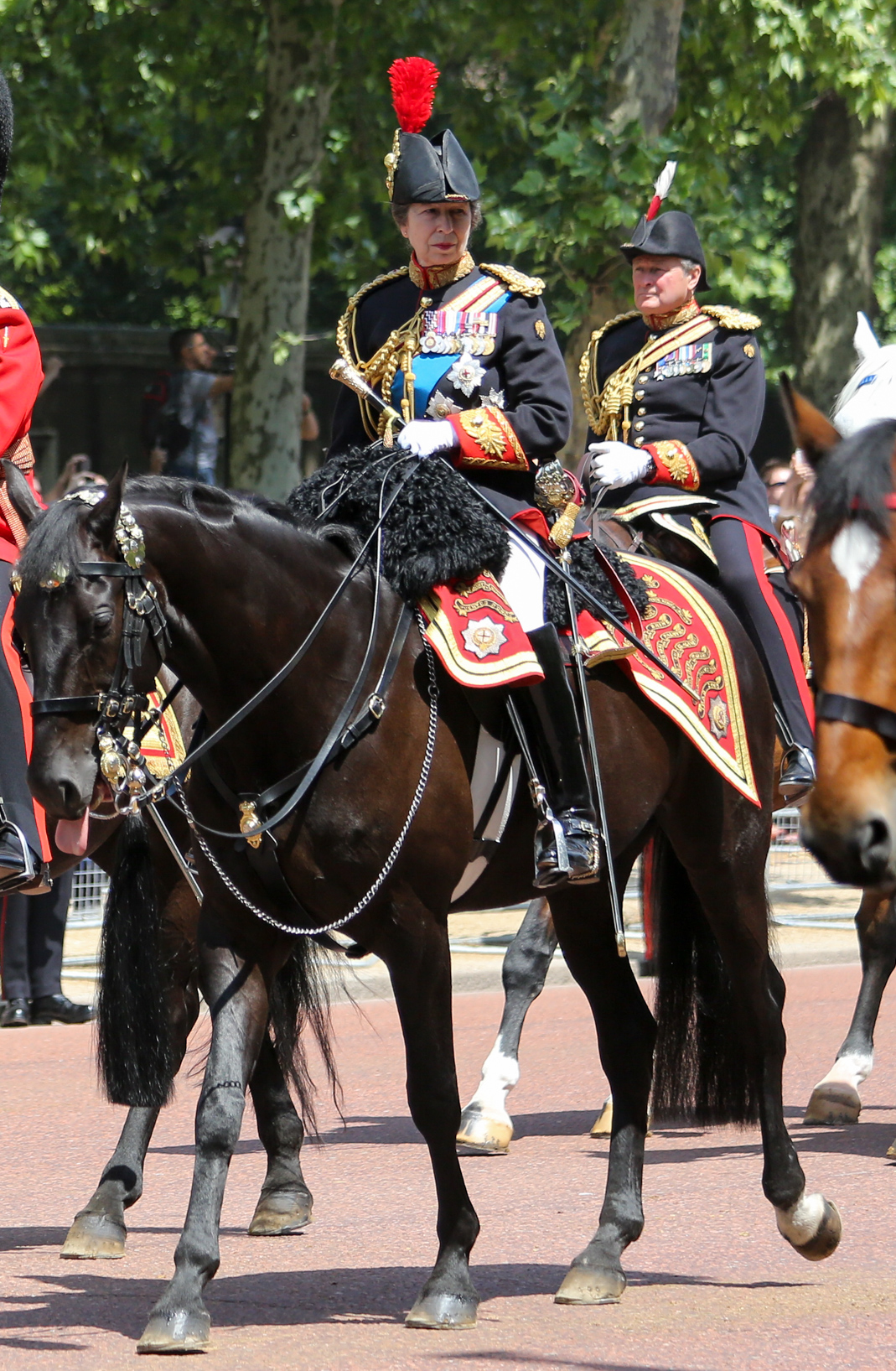
Anne, Princess Royal, on duty as Gold Stick-in-Waiting, in her uniform as Colonel of the Blues and Royals

The Gold Stick and the Silver Stick are formal bodyguard positions in the British Royal Household, serving as personal attendants to the Sovereign on ceremonial occasions.

== Gold Stick ==
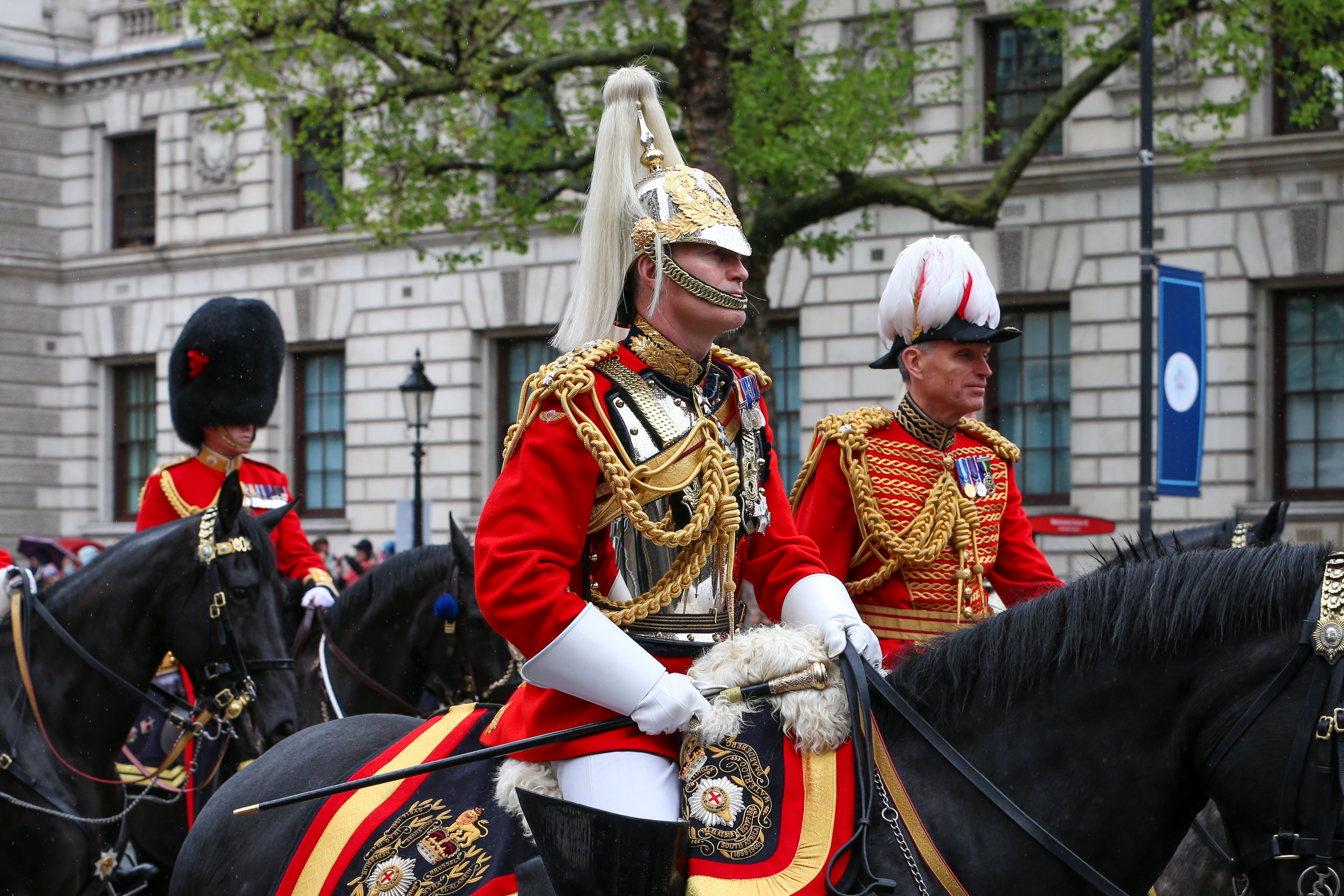
Lieutenant General Sir Edward Smyth-Osbourne, the Regimental Colonel of the Life Guards and Gold Stick-in-Waiting during the Coronation Procession of Charles III

Although now only in evidence on ceremonial and state occasions, the office of Gold Stick dates from Tudor times, when two officers were placed close to the Sovereign's person to protect him or her from danger. The office is held jointly by the Colonels of the Life Guards and the Blues and Royals, the two regiments of the Household Cavalry. The Gold Sticks, of whom one at any time is on duty as Gold Stick-in-Waiting, were originally entrusted with the personal safety of the Sovereign. Since the reign of Queen Victoria these officers' duties have been mainly ceremonial; they attend all state occasions and take part in the processions for the Coronation and the State Opening of Parliament. On these occasions, Gold Stick conveys the Sovereign's orders to the Household Cavalry. The name derives from the staff of office, which has a gold head.

Anne, Princess Royal, the daughter of the late Queen Elizabeth II and younger sister of King Charles III, became Colonel of the Blues and Royals in 1998. Lieutenant General Sir Edward Smyth-Osbourne became Colonel of the Life Guards in 2019.

== Silver Stick ==
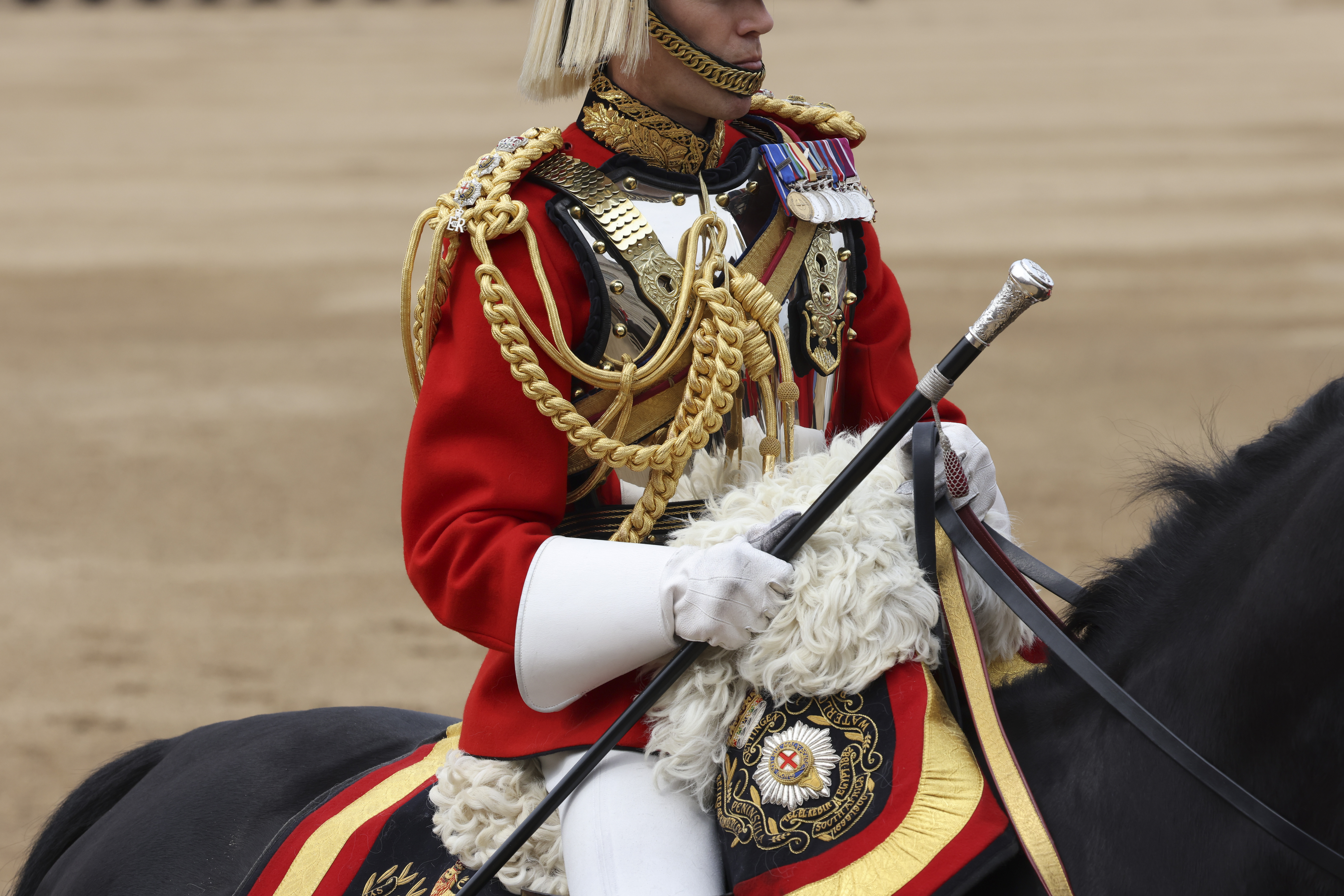
Silver Stick-in-Waiting (Colonel Mark Berry) at the 2023 King's Birthday Parade.

The Silver Stick is the Commander of the Household Cavalry and holds the rank of colonel. Silver Stick-in-Waiting is the deputy (assistant) to Gold Stick-in-Waiting, but there are occasions when Silver Stick only is summoned for duty—for example, on the arrival of a head of state on a state visit.

The office was created in 1678, and until 1950 was held by the lieutenant-colonels in command of the Household Cavalry regiments, serving by monthly rotation. Originally, only the 1st and 2nd Life Guards were included, but in 1820 the Royal Horse Guards were added (the 1st and 2nd Life Guards were amalgamated together in 1922 and the Royal Horse Guards were amalgamated with the Royal Dragoons to form the Blues and Royals in 1969).

Now the (Colonel) Commander Household Cavalry holds the office alone. Through the authority of the Gold Stick he has the detail of regiments and individuals to carry out royal duties. In general, the Silver Stick has charge of all ceremonial duties for the Sovereign.

Silver Stick's principal aide when on duty is termed Silver Stick Adjutant.

== Scotland ==
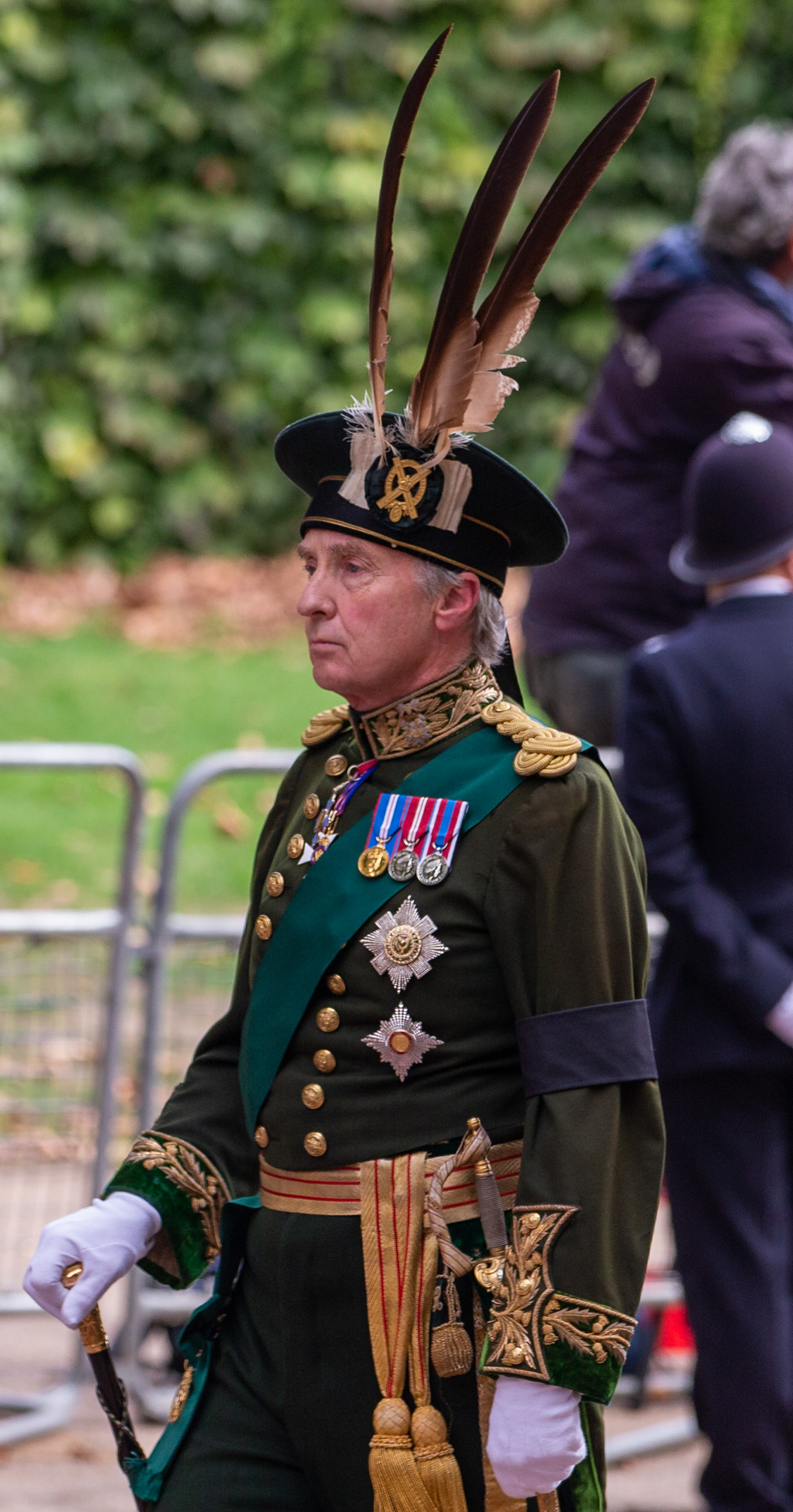
Richard Scott, 10th Duke of Buccleuch, the Captain General of the Royal Company of Archers and Gold Stick for Scotland during Elizabeth II's funeral procession

There are separate Gold and Silver Sticks in Scotland, who are the senior officers of the Sovereign's Bodyguard of the Royal Company of Archers.
