= London District (British Army) =

Command of the British Army

Coordinates: 51.5046°N 0.1272°W

- Insignia of the London District
- Active: 1905–present
- Country: United Kingdom
- Branch: British Army
- Type: Regular / Army Reserve
- Part of: Home Command
- Garrison/HQ: Horse Guards

Commanders
- General Officer Commanding, London District: Major General Mark Berry
- Deputy Commander, London District: Brigadier Sam Cates
- Chief of Staff, London District: Colonel Guy Stone LVO
- Civil Secretary, London District: Steven Rocknean
- Deputy Chief of Staff, London District: Lieutenant Colonel Matthew Forde
- Brigade Major, London District: Lieutenant Colonel Charles Foinette, Coldstream Guards
- Garrison Sergeant Major: Warrant Officer Class 1, Andrew "Vern" Stokes

London District (LONDIST) is the name given by the British Army to the area of operations encompassing the Greater London area. It was established in 1870 as Home District.

== History ==
In January 1876 a ‘Mobilization Scheme for the forces in Great Britain and Ireland’ was published, with the ‘Active Army’ divided into eight army corps based on the District Commands. 3rd Corps was to be formed within London District, based in Croydon. This scheme disappeared in 1881, when the districts were retitled ‘District Commands. It was re-formed in 1905 as London District to be an independent district within the larger command structure of the army, and has remained so ever since. In 1906, when the Chief of the General Staff moved to the Old War Office Building, HQ London District moved to Horse Guards. In September 1939, the district included the 1st and 2nd London Divisions, the 22nd Armoured Brigade, the Life Guards and Royal Horse Guards and five Guards infantry battalions.

During the Second World War the operational headquarters of London District was temporarily based at Leconfield House in Curzon Street. After the war Headquarters London District returned to Horse Guards, where it remains under the command of the General Officer Commanding (GOC). The incumbent is concurrently the Major-General commanding the Household Division. The Garrison Sergeant Major is currently Warrant Officer Class 1 (WO1) Andrew 'Vern' Stokes COLDM GDS.

London District included the 56th (London) Brigade from January 1987 to 1993.

By 2007 the units in the district included the Household Cavalry Mounted Regiment; the 1st Battalions of the Welsh Guards and Coldstream Guards; 2nd Battalion, Mercian Regiment; Nijmegen Company, Grenadier Guards, No. 7 Company, Coldstream Guards, and F Company, Scots Guards, the three Guards incremental companies; The King's Troop, Royal Horse Artillery; 20 Transport Squadron, Royal Logistic Corps; headquarters and much of the Army Reserve's Royal Yeomanry; the London Regiment; 106 (Yeomanry) Regiment Royal Artillery; 135 Independent Geography Squadron, Royal Engineers; 151 (London) Transport Regiment, Royal Logistic Corps; Central Volunteer Headquarters RA; and the University of London Officers' Training Corps.

== Forces ==
London District supervises several operational infantry battalions that are not attached to a deployable brigade, but instead are available for independent deployment as needed; as well as carrying out ceremonial and vital asset/facilities protection, including of the Royal Family. The district is also regionally aligned with the Caribbean region as part of defence engagement (the use of people and assets to prevent conflict, build stability and gain influence).

HQ London District is responsible for the administration of all Army units within Greater London and Windsor that are not part of another formation:

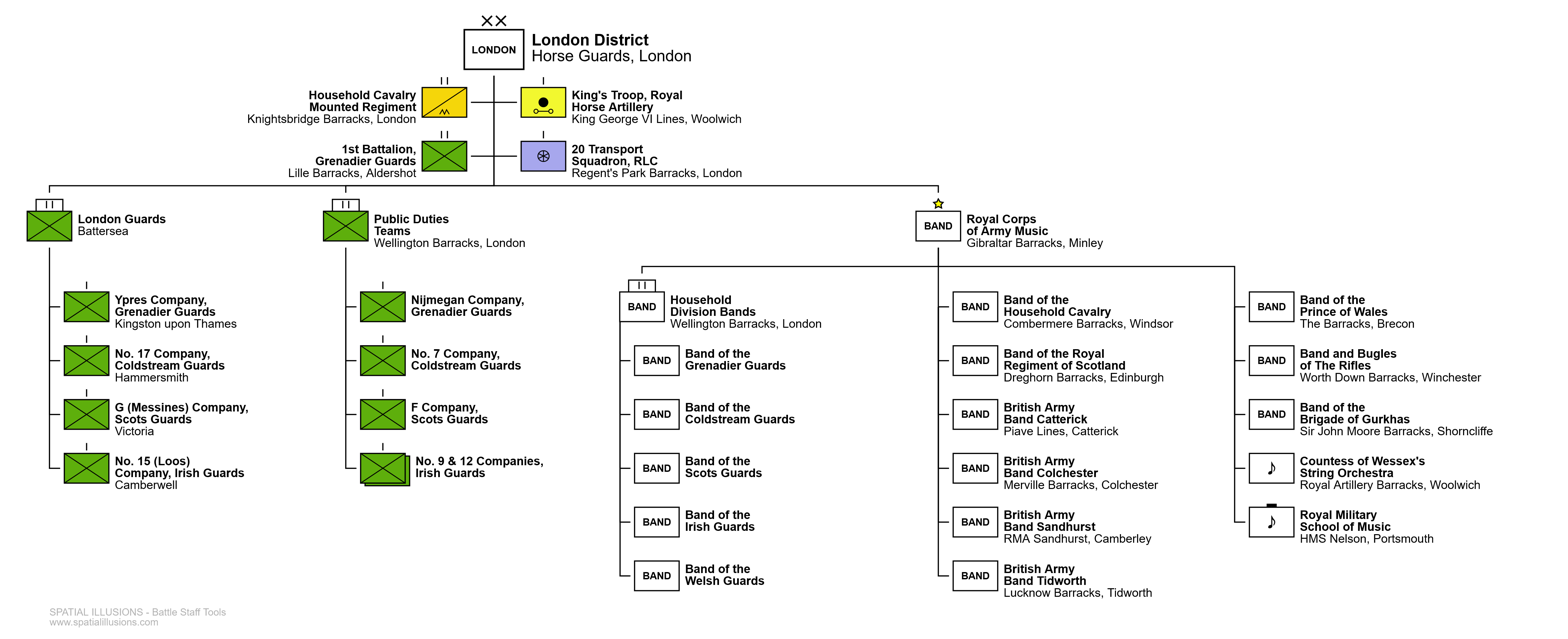

- Household Cavalry Mounted Regiment, Hyde Park Barracks, Knightsbridge, London
- The King's Troop, Royal Horse Artillery, Royal Artillery Barracks, Woolwich, London
- 1st Battalion, Grenadier Guards, Lille Barracks, Aldershot
- 1st Battalion, Coldstream Guards, Victoria Barracks, Windsor, Windsor.
- 1st Battalion, Welsh Guards, Combermere Barracks, Windsor
- Nijmegen Company, Grenadier Guards, Wellington Barracks
- No 7 Company, Coldstream Guards, Wellington Barracks
- F Company, Scots Guards, Wellington Barracks
- No 9 Company, Irish Guards, Wellington Barracks
- No 12 Company, Irish Guards, Wellington Barracks
- 20 Transport Squadron, Royal Logistic Corps based at Regent's Park Barracks, provides all the transport needs for London District and the Royal Household
- 238 (London) Signal Squadron, Royal Corps of Signals provides all communications for London District

== Sources ==
- Tabor, Paddy, The Household Cavalry Museum, Ajanta Book Publishing, 2010, ISBN 978-1-84820-882-7
