= 2006 Birthday Honours =

British government recognitions

The Birthday Honours 2006 for the Commonwealth realms were announced on 17 June 2006, to celebrate the Queen's Birthday of 2006.

The recipients of honours are displayed here as they were styled before their new honour, and arranged firstly by the country whose ministers advised the Queen on the appointments, then by honour, with classes (Knight, Knight Grand Cross, etc.) and then divisions (Military, Civil, etc.) as appropriate.

== United Kingdom ==
=== Knight Bachelor ===
- Michael John Aaronson, CBE, lately Director-General, Save the Children. For services to Children.
- Professor Roy Malcolm Anderson, Chief Scientific Adviser, Ministry of Defence.
- Jonathan Elliott Asbridge, President, Nursing and Midwifery Council. For services to the NHS and Nursing.
- Norman George Bettison, QPM, Chief Executive, Centrex and lately Chief Constable, Merseyside Police. For services to the Police.
- James Robert Crosby, Chief Executive, HBOS plc. For services to the Finance Industry.
- Donald Gordon Cruickshank. For public service.
- Professor Barrington Windsor Cunliffe, CBE, Professor of European Archaeology, University of Oxford. For services to Archaeology.
- Professor Albert Aynsley-Green, Children's Commissioner for England. For services to Children and Young People.
- Philip Green, Retail Executive. For services to the Retail Industry.
- Mark Grundy, Headteacher, Shireland Language College, Smethwick, Sandwell, West Midlands. For services to Education and to ICT.
- Dr. Richard Timothy Hunt, Principal Scientist, Cancer Research UK. For services to Science.
- Stelios Haji-Ioannou. For services to Entrepreneurship.
- Brian Gammell Ivory, CBE, Chair, Board of Trustees, National Galleries of Scotland. For services to the Arts.
- Kenneth John Knight, CBE, QFSM, Commissioner, London Fire Brigade. For services to the Fire and Rescue Service.
- Councillor Richard Charles Leese, CBE, leader, Manchester City Council. For services to Local Government.
- Robert John Margetts, CBE, Chair, Natural Environment Research Council. For services to Science and to Business.
- David Michael Charles Michels, lately Chief Executive, Hilton Group plc. For services to the Hospitality Industry.
- David Gerald Richards, Chair, Football Association Premier League and Football Foundation. For services to Sport.
- Dr. Peter Jeffery Simpson, President, Royal College of Anaesthetists. For services to the NHS.
- John Michael Sunderland, Chair, Cadbury Schweppes and President, Confederation of British Industry. For services to Business.
- Gilbert Stanley Thomas, OBE. For services to Business and to Charity in Wales.
- Charles Cornelius Wheeler, CMG. For services to Broadcasting and to Journalism.
- Professor Roger Williams, Chair, Higher Education Funding Council for Wales. For services to Higher Education.

Diplomatic Service and Overseas List

- The Honourable Mr. Justice Lisle Austin Ward, QC, lately Chief Justice of the Supreme Court, Bermuda.

=== Order of the Bath ===
==== Knight Commander of the Order of the Bath (KCB) ====
Military Division

- Vice Admiral Timothy Pentreath McClement, OBE.

Civil Division

- John Elvidge, Permanent Secretary, Scottish Executive.
- David Rowlands, CB, Permanent Secretary, Department for Transport.
- Roger Blakemore Sands, Clerk of the House and Chief Executive, House of Commons.

==== Companion of the Order of the Bath (CB) ====
Military Division

- Rear Admiral Nicholas Henry Linton Harris, MBE.
- Surgeon Vice Admiral Ian Lawrence Jenkins, CVO.
- Major General David Robert Bill (496284), late Corps of Royal Engineers.
- Major General David Malcolm Howell, OBE, (500438), late Adjutant General's Corps (Army Legal Services Branch).
- Air Vice-Marshal Iain Walter McNicoll, CBE, Royal Air Force.

Civil Division

- Philip Richard Hernaman Allen, lately Director, Corporate Services, Department for Environment, Food and Rural Affairs.
- John William Bacon, lately Group Director, Health and Social Care Delivery, Department of Health.
- Dr. Jonathan Richard Bell, lately Chief Executive, Food Standards Agency.
- Simon Brooks, director, Macroeconomics, HM Treasury.
- Michelle Mary Egan, Regional Offender Manager, National Offender Management Service.
- Thomas Baird Jeffery, Director-General, Children, Young People and Families, Department for Education and Skills.
- Greer Sandra Kerrigan, Legal Director, Law, Governance and Special Policy Group, Department for Work and Pensions.
- Joseph Montgomery, Director-General, Tackling Disadvantage Group, Department for Communities and Local Government.
- Nicola Susan Munro, Head, Development Department, Scottish Executive.
- Christopher Peter Jayantha Muttukumaru, The Legal Adviser and Legal Services Director, Department for Transport.
- Laurence Oates, Official Solicitor and Public Trustee, Department for Constitutional Affairs.
- David Alan Pritchard, lately Head, Economic Development and Transport Department, National Assembly for Wales.

=== Order of St Michael and St George ===
==== Knight Grand Cross of the Order of St Michael and St George (GCMG) ====
Diplomatic Service and Overseas List

- Sir Michael Hastings Jay, KCMG, Permanent Under-Secretary of State, Foreign and Commonwealth Office and Head of the Diplomatic Service.

==== Knight Commander of the Order of St Michael and St George (KCMG) ====
Diplomatic Service and Overseas List

- Richard Hugh Turton Gozney, CMG, British High Commissioner, Abuja.
- Mark Justin Lyall Grant, CMG, British High Commissioner, Islamabad.

==== Companion of the Order of St Michael and St George (CMG) ====
- Gillian Mary Anne Lambert, Deputy UK Permanent Representative to the European Union in Brussels.
- Paul Vallely. For services to Journalism and to the Developing World.

Diplomatic Service and Overseas List

- Timothy Earle Barrow, LVO, MBE, Counsellor, Foreign and Commonwealth Office.
- Robert Scott Dewar, HM Ambassador, Addis Ababa.
- Hazel Mary, Lady Fox, QC (Hon). For services to international and comparative law.
- David George Hamilton Frost, Counsellor, Foreign and Commonwealth Office.
- Ian Charles Stewart Johnson, lately Vice-President and Head of the Environmentally and Socially Sustainable Development Network, World Bank.
- Julian Beresford King, Political and Security Council Representative, Office of the UK Permanent Representative to the European Union.
- Edward Anthony Oakden, director, Foreign and Commonwealth Office.
- Christopher Robert Geoffrey Pagett, OBE, Counsellor, Foreign and Commonwealth Office.
- Paul Raymond Sizeland, director, Foreign and Commonwealth Office.
- Robin Anthony Vincent, CBE, lately Registrar, Special Court for Sierra Leone.
- Ralph Zacklin, lately Assistant Secretary-General, United Nations Secretariat.

=== Royal Victorian Order ===
==== Knight Commander of the Royal Victorian Order (KCVO) ====
- Claude Dunbar Hankes-Drielsma, formerly Trustee and Adviser, St. George's House, Windsor Castle.
- Major Richard Yates Henderson, Lord Lieutenant of Ayrshire and Arran.
- Ronald Hobson. For services to charity.
- Robert Richard Taylor, OBE, Lord Lieutenant of the West Midlands.

==== Commander of the Royal Victorian Order (CVO) ====
- Adam Anthony Murless Lewis, formerly Serjeant Surgeon, Royal Household.

==== Lieutenant of the Royal Victorian Order (LVO) ====
- Major Barnaby Cockcroft, Lieutenant, Her Majesty's Body Guard of the Honourable Corps of Gentlemen at Arms.
- Anne Frost, Lady in Waiting to Princess Michael of Kent.
- Colonel Robert Shaun Longsdon, Lieutenant, The Queen's Body Guard of the Yeomen of the Guard.
- Jennifer Iris Rachel Montagu. For services to the Royal Collection.
- Lieutenant Commander Christopher William Pittaway, MVO, Royal Navy (Retd), Manager/Chief Pilot, The Queen's Helicopter Flight.
- Eric Stephen Sharp, formerly Operations Director, The Duke of Edinburgh's Award.
- Captain Colin Michael Cato Stewart, formerly Assistant of the Corporation of Trinity House.

==== Member of the Royal Victorian Order (MVO) ====
- Peter James George Archer, formerly Court Correspondent, Press Association.
- Tonino Bonici, RVM, Palace Foreman, Buckingham Palace.
- Antigoni Christodoulou, Clerk Comptroller, The Duke and Duchess of Kent's Household.
- Paul Frank Cradock, Horological Conservator, Royal Collection.
- Philip Shaun Croasdale, RVM, Standards and Training Manager, Master of the Household's Department.
- Chief Inspector Richard James Curtis, Norfolk Constabulary. For services to Royalty Protection.
- Mark Fromont, RVM, Premier Chef, Royal Household.
- Lucinda Gooch, Retail and Publishing Co-ordinator, Royal Collection.
- Andrew Mark Holt, Building Surveyor, Sandringham Estate.
- Mary Angela Kelly, Personal Assistant and Senior Dresser to The Queen.
- Vivienne Bowen Morgan, director, The Prince's Trust, Carmarthenshire.
- Wing Commander Richard Edward George Pattle, Royal Air Force, formerly Equerry to the Prince of Wales and the Duchess of Cornwall.
- Terence Alan Pendry, BEM, Stud Groom and Manager, Royal Mews, Windsor Castle.
- Jane Pithers, formerly Personnel Manager, Crown Estate, Windsor.
- Inspector Carol Alexandra Quirk, Metropolitan Police. For services to Royalty Protection.
- Lynette Joyce Randall, Head of Savill Gardens, Crown Estate, Windsor Great Park.
- Sergeant Dominic Charles Ryan, Metropolitan Police. For services to Royalty Protection.
- Brian Alan Ernest Stanley, RVM, Stud Groom, Royal Paddocks, Hampton Court.
- Susan Elaine Welch, Secretary, Lieutenancy Office, Derbyshire.
- Norma Mae Blossom Wynter, Personal Secretary to the Governor-General of Jamaica.

==== Medal of the Royal Victorian Order (RVM) ====
Bar to the Royal Victorian Medal (Silver)

- Edward George Reginald Charlett, RVM, Groom of the Vestry, Her Majesty's Chapel Royal, St. James's Palace.
- Keith Howard Griffiths, RVM, Courier, Royal Household.
- Anthony Albert Harrowsmith, RVM, formerly Chief Woodman, Crewe Survey, Duchy of Lancaster.
- John Trodden Kerr, RVM, Leading Palace Attendant, Windsor Castle.
- Roger Edward Standen, RVM, Senior Housekeeping Assistant, Buckingham Palace.

Royal Victorian Medal (Silver)

- Colin Richard Cartwright, formerly Lay Clerk, St. George's Chapel, Windsor Castle.
- Trevor John Craddock, Lay Clerk, St. George's Chapel, Windsor Castle.
- Stephen Cuthbert, Gamekeeper, Sandringham Estate.
- Karl Patrick Dennis, Forestry Worker, Sandringham Estate.
- Avril Janette Cranston Dent, Deputy Housekeeper, Palace of Holyroodhouse.
- Rachel Ann Jane Gordon, Assistant Housekeeper, Windsor Castle.
- William Allan Henderson, Page of the Backstairs, Master of the Household's Department.
- Robert Stephen Jones, Palace Attendant, Buckingham Palace.
- Thomas Robert Peggie, Senior Painter, Balmoral Estate.
- Stephen John Read, Horticulturalist/Steward, Thatched House Lodge.
- John Leonard Reed, Stud Hand, Royal Studs, Sandringham.
- Russell Peter Sturgess, Forestry Team Supervisor, Crown Estate, Windsor.

=== Order of the Companions of Honour (CH) ===
Diplomatic Service and Overseas List

- Professor Anthony James Pawson, OC. For services to genetic science and cancer research.

=== Order of the British Empire ===
==== Dame Commander of the Order of the British Empire (DBE) ====
Civil Division

- Jane Susan Campbell, MBE, lately Chair, Social Care Institute for Excellence. For services to Social Care and to Disabled People.
- Professor Hazel Gillian Genn, CBE, Professor of Socio-Legal Studies, University College, London. For services to Civil Justice.
- Professor Carole Jordan, Professor of Physics, Department of Physics (Theoretical Physics), University of Oxford. For services to Physics and Astronomy.
- Professor Janet Laughland Nelson, Professor of Medieval History, King's College London. For services to History.
- Dr. Ruth Muldoon Silver, CBE, Principal, Lewisham College, London. For services to Further Education.

==== Knight Commander of the Order of the British Empire (KBE) ====
- Michael Terence Wogan, K.B.E. (to be dated 11 October 2005).

==== Commander of the Order of the British Empire (CBE) ====
Military Division

Royal Navy

- Commodore Charles Percival Ross Montgomery.
- Commodore Richard Christopher Twitchen.

Army

- Brigadier Colin James Boag (516557), late Corps of Royal Engineers.
- Colonel James Euan Cameron (512583), late The Princess of Wales's Royal Regiment.
- Brigadier Anthony John Faith, OBE, (493707), late Royal Regiment of Artillery.
- Brigadier Mark Nicholas Pountain (500845), late Royal Regiment of Artillery.
- Brigadier Jonathan David Shaw (511719), late The Parachute Regiment.
- Colonel Miles William Ellis Wade, MBE, (503541), late The King's Royal Hussars.

Royal Air Force

- Group Captain Robert Gordon Kemp, QVRM, AE. (4232872N), Royal Auxiliary Air Force.
- Group Captain Paul Nolan Oborn (8027476P).
- Air Commodore Paul Royston Thomas, MBE, (5202367P).

Civil Division

- Francis George Boden Aldhouse, lately Deputy Information Commissioner. For services to Data Protection.
- Douglas Kinloch Bain, TD, lately Director of Services, Northern Ireland Prison Service.
- Katharine Mary Barker, Board Member, Housing Corporation. For services to Social Housing.
- Dr. Peter John Barrett, Chair, Independent Reconfiguration Panel. For services to the NHS.
- James Kevin Barron, Head, Independent Offices, Cabinet Office.
- Professor Jonathan Bate, Professor of Shakespeare and Renaissance Literature, University of Warwick. For services to Higher Education.
- Susan Battle, OBE, Chief Executive Officer, Birmingham Chamber of Commerce and Industry. For services to Business in the West Midlands.
- Professor Jean Duthie Beggs, Royal Society Darwin Trust Research Professor and Professor of Molecular Biology, University of Edinburgh. For services to Science.
- Dr. John William Belcher, Chief Executive, Anchor Trust. For services to Elderly People.
- Professor Margaret Carol Bell, Professor of Traffic and Environment Pollution, Institute of Transport Studies, University of Leeds. For services to Sustainable Transport.
- Anthony Richard Bennett, General-Secretary, British Overseas Non-Government Organisations for Development (BOND). For services to International Development.
- Dr. Seton John Bennett, Deputy Director, National Physical Laboratory. For services to International Metrology.
- Brenda Bigland, Headteacher, Lent Rise Combined School, Burnham, Buckinghamshire. For services to Education.
- David John Blackwood, Director, BP Exploration Operating Company. For services to the Oil and Gas Industries.
- Timothy John Bowdler, Chief Executive, Johnston Press plc. For services to the Newspaper Industry.
- Michael Brownlee, Deputy Head, Pricing and Supply, Medicines, Pharmacy and Industry Group, Department of Health.
- Professor Thomas Patrick Burns, Professor of Social Psychiatry, Oxford University Medical School and Oxfordshire and Buckinghamshire Mental Healthcare NHS Trust. For services to Mental Health.
- Joan Burstein, Co-Founder, Browns, Fashion Store. For services to the Fashion and Retail Industries.
- Darcey Andrea Bussell, OBE, Company Principal, Royal Ballet. For services to Dance.
- Timothy John Byles, Chief Executive, Norfolk County Council. For services to Local Government.
- John Callcutt, Chief Executive, English Partnerships. For services to Social Housing and to Urban Regeneration.
- Gordon Arden Campbell, Chair, British Nuclear Fuels Ltd. For services to Business and to Engineering.
- Dr. Simon Fraser Campbell, President, Royal Society of Chemistry. For services to Science.
- William James Capper, Chair and lately Managing Director, Capper & Co Ltd. For services to Business and to the community in Wales.
- Wilfred Cass, Co-Founder, Cass Sculpture Foundation. For services to Art.
- Sarah Regina Florence Clarke, Chief Highways Engineer, Highways Agency.
- Richard Edward Davidson Coldwell, Board Member, Higher Education Funding Council for England. For services to Higher Education.
- Jean Couper, lately Chairman, Scottish Legal Aid Board. For services to the administration of Justice.
- Dr. Claire Harvey Craig, lately Director, Foresight Programme, Office of Science and Technology.
- Lynn Davies, MBE. For services to Sport, in particular Athletics.
- Gordon Charles Dickinson, lately Assistant Director, Serious Fraud Office and Solicitor to the Bloody Sunday Inquiry.
- Jeannie Drake, OBE, lately Member, Pensions Commission. For services to the Pension Industry.
- Arthur Joseph Durrant, Director, Centralised Processing, HM Revenue and Customs.
- Christina Elizabeth Edwards, Account Director/Director of Nursing, Performance Support Team, County Durham and Tees Valley Strategic Health Authority. For services to the NHS.
- William Derek Everard, Managing Director, F.T. Everard and Sons Ltd. For services to the Shipping Industry.
- Douglas Jardine Flint, Group Finance Director, HSBC Holdings plc. For services to the Finance Industry.
- David Garlick, OBE, Director, Large Business Service, HM Revenue and Customs.
- Anne Margaret Glover, Co-Founder and Chief Executive Officer, Amadeus Capital Partners Limited. For services to Business.
- Michael John Greenwood, Regional Director, Local Government Practice, North West, Department for Communities and Local Government.
- Judith Elizabeth Hackitt, Director, Chemistry for Europe Implementation, European Chemical Industry Council. For services to Occupational Health and Safety.
- Helen Clare Hamilton, Clinical Nurse Specialist, Oxford Radcliffe Hospital. For services to Healthcare.
- Anthony Hartney, Headteacher, Gladesmore Community School, Haringey, London. For services to Education.
- Professor Nicholas Hastie, Director, Human Genetics Unit, Medical Research Council. For services to Science.
- Andrew Christopher Hayman, QPM, Assistant Commissioner, Specialist Crime, Metropolitan Police. For services to the Police.
- Sarah Elizabeth Hendry, Head, Global Atmosphere Division, Department for Environment, Food and Rural Affairs.
- Professor James Wilson Ironside, Professor of Clinical Neuropathology, National Creutzfeldt-Jakob Disease Surveillance Unit, University of Edinburgh. For services to Medicine.
- Professor George Livingston Irving, Chair, Ayrshire and Arran NHS Board. For services to the NHS and to the community in Ayrshire.
- Dr. Barrie Jones, Chief Operating Officer, Mines Rescue Service Ltd. For services to the Coal Industry.
- Karen Elisabeth Dind Jones, Chief Executive, Spirit Group. For services to the Hospitality Industry.
- Richard Kirk, Chief Executive, Peacock Group plc. For services to Business and to Charity in Wales.
- Andrew Gerard Kuyk, Head, Crops, Plants and Produce Division, Department for Environment, Food and Rural Affairs.
- David William Kyle. For services to the Criminal Justice System.
- Jennifer Irene Leach, lately Chief Guide, Girlguiding UK. For services to Young People.
- Peter Lord, Co-Founder, Aardman Animation Ltd. For services to Animation and Film.
- Professor Sarah Jane Macintyre, OBE, Director, Social and Public Health Sciences Unit, Medical Research Council; and Honorary Professor, University of Glasgow. For services to Social Science.
- Hilary Mary Mantel, Writer. For services to Literature.
- Peter Martin. For services to People who Misuse Substances.
- Richard Henry Maudslay, Deputy Chairman, Hardy & Greys Ltd. For services to Business in the North East.
- Amelia Freedman-Miller, MBE, Founder and Artistic Director, Nash Ensemble. For services to Music.
- John Robert Milligan, Chair of Court, University of Dundee. For services to Higher Education and to Welfare to Work.
- George Mitchell, lately Chief Executive, Corporate Banking, HBOS plc and Governor, Bank of Scotland. For services to the Finance Industry.
- Dr. Lynne Patricia Morris, Principal, Joseph Chamberlain College, Birmingham. For services to Further Education.
- John Maughan Myers, lately Senior Operating Officer, The Pension Service.
- Eric Luciano Nicoli, Executive Chair, EMI Group plc. For services to the Music Industry.
- Douglas McCallum Paterson. Chief Executive, Aberdeen City Council. For services to Local Government.
- Professor Richard Henry Collins Penny. For services to Veterinary Education and Animal Welfare.
- His Honour Judge John Andrew Phillips. For services to the Criminal Justice System.
- Professor Cynthia Pine, Dean of Dental Studies, University of Liverpool. For services to Dentistry.
- Kevin Pogson, Regional Director for the South East, Her Majesty's Court Service.
- Elizabeth Railton, Honorary Secretary, Association of Directors of Social Services and Director of Children's Services, Essex County Council. For services to Local Government.
- Esther Louise Rantzen, OBE, (Mrs. Wilcox), President, ChildLine; Trustee, NSPCC and President, Association of Young People with Myalgic Encephalomyelitis. For services to Children and Young People.
- Professor Francis Christopher Rowland Robinson, Professor of History of South Asia, Royal Holloway, University of London. For services to Higher Education and to the History of Islam.
- Stephen John Sanderson, Headteacher, St. Joan of Arc Roman Catholic Primary School, Bootle, Sefton. For services to Education.
- William Desmond Sargent, C.B.E. (to be dated 14 April 2005).
- Professor Simon Andrew Smail, Dean, School of Postgraduate Medical and Dental Education, Cardiff University. For services to Medicine.
- John Edward Spanswick, Chairman, Bovis Lend Lease. For services to Health and Safety and to the Construction Industry.
- Christopher Alexander Spence, MBE. For charitable services.
- David Sproxton, Co-Founder, Aardman Animation Ltd. For services to Animation and Film.
- Mollie Temple, lately Vice-Chancellor, University of Bolton. For services to Higher Education.
- Patricia Anne Thomas, lately Local Government Ombudsman. For services to Local Government.
- Margaret Edith Thorne, OBE, Chair, Neath Port Talbot Council of Voluntary Service. For charitable services in Wales.
- William Brian Turtle, Director and Chief Executive, Belfast Institute of Further and Higher Education. For services to Further Education and to Lifelong Learning.
- Julia Unwin, OBE, Deputy-Chair, Food Standards Agency. For services to Consumers.
- Sarah Veale, Head, Equality and Employment Rights, Trades Union Congress. For services to Diversity.
- Stephen Walker, Chief Executive, NHS Litigation Authority. For services to the NHS.
- Deborah Warner, Theatre and Opera Director. For services to Drama.
- Professor Cathy Warwick, Honorary Professor of Midwifery, King's College London School of Midwifery. For services to Healthcare.
- Barbara Wilding, QPM, Chief Constable, South Wales Police. For services to the Police.
- Dr. Hamish Robert McHattie Wilson, lately Head, Primary Care Division, Scottish Executive.
- Janet Mary Wilson, Leader, Sheffield City Council. For services to Local Government.
- Lynda Wilson, Director, Barnardo's Northern Ireland. For services to Children and Families.
- Roger James Wilson, Head, Department for International Development, Malawi.
- Peter Lewis Wyman. For services to the Accountancy Profession.

Diplomatic Service and Overseas List

- David Edmund Ian Pyott. For services to British business interests.
- Professor Jeffrey Samuel Robinson. For services to maternal and foetal health.
- John Edmund Elliot Whittaker. For charitable services in the UK and overseas.

==== Officer of the Order of the British Empire (OBE) ====
Military Division

Royal Navy

- Captain Nigel Maurice Christopher Chambers.
- Captain John Michael Knowles.
- Commander Michael Terence Martin.
- Captain Simon Charles Martin, LVO.
- Lieutenant Colonel (now Acting Colonel) Joseph McCabe, Royal Marines.
- Major Stephen Potter, Royal Marines.
- Captain Paul Anthony Quinn.
- Commander Ian Charles Riches.

Army

- Colonel Paul Adrian Stewart Cartwright (517407), late The Royal Highland Fusiliers.
- Major David Andrew Cooper (510300), The Parachute Regiment.
- Lieutenant Colonel Alan Thomas Evans (495162), Royal Corps of Signals, Territorial Army.
- Lieutenant Colonel Antony Paul Ferris, MBE, (544563), Royal Corps of Signals.
- Lieutenant Colonel Mark Redman Goldsack, MBE, (524749), The Light Infantry.
- Lieutenant Colonel Christopher John Griggs (520655), The Royal Logistic Corps.
- Lieutenant Colonel Simon Lea Humphrey (522387), Royal Regiment of Artillery.
- Colonel Charles Peter Huntley Knaggs (513903), late Irish Guards.
- Lieutenant Colonel Peter James McGuigan (517027), The Royal Logistic Corps.
- Lieutenant Colonel Ian Alexander Rigden (514623), The Royal Gurkha Rifles.
- Lieutenant Colonel John Matthew Rochelle, MC. (499763), The Staffordshire Regiment.
- Lieutenant Colonel Andrew John Newman Simkins (495233), Army Air Corps.

Royal Air Force

- Group Captain Susan Elizabeth Bonell (0009249C).
- Wing Commander Mark Owen Brown (8029302T).
- Wing Commander John Keith Cocksey (5205093X).
- Wing Commander Robert John Cowell (8023879G).
- Wing Commander Angela Bridget Hawley (0009402S).
- Wing Commander Andrew Kay (8015068E).
- Wing Commander Robert Noel (8029053J).

Civil Division

- Saghir Alam, Disability Rights Commissioner. For services to Disabled People.
- Leslie Alexander Aldridge, lately Leader, Flintshire County Council and leader, Welsh Local Government Association. For services to Local Government.
- Caroline Allen, Principal, Orchard Hill Specialist Further Education College, Sutton, Surrey. For services to Further Education.
- David Lowden Antrobus, Chair, British Business and General Aviation Association. For services to Aviation.
- Robert David Armstrong, lately Director, United Utilities Water plc. For services to the Water Industry.
- Barry Edward Arnold, managing director, Stagecoach London Bus Company and Chair, Confederation of Passenger Transport London Operators' Group. For services to the Bus Industry in London.
- The Reverend William John Arthur, Trans-European Director, Adventist Development and Relief Agency. For services to Overseas Aid.
- Shun Ying Au, Chair and Founder, Chinese Mental Health Association. For services to the Chinese Community.
- Dr. Alan Thomas Axford, Medical Director, Ceredigion & Mid Wales NHS Trust. For services to Medicine.
- Keith Banbury, Chief Executive, British Parking Association. For services to the Parking Industry.
- James Christopher Barclay, lately non-executive director, United Kingdom Debt Management Office. For services to the Finance Industry.
- Dr. Alan Barr, co-Director, Scottish Community Development Centre and vice-chair, Community Development Alliance Scotland. For services to Social Justice in Scotland.
- Francine Bates, Chief Executive, Contact a Family. For services to Families with Disabled Children.
- Eric Belfield, lately Divisional Director, Programme Delivery, Highways Agency. (Deceased: to be dated 15 May 2005.)
- Lynne Berry, Chief Executive, General Social Care Council. For services to Social Care.
- Dr. Sabyasachi Bhaumik, Consultant Psychiatrist, Learning Disability Services, Leicestershire Partnership NHS Trust. For services to Medicine.
- Richard George Black, Chief Executive, North and West Belfast Health and Social Services Trust. For services to Healthcare in Northern Ireland.
- Catherine Blanshard, Chief of Libraries, Arts and Heritage, Leeds City Council. For services to Local Government.
- Annabelle Bond. For services to Mountaineering and to the Eve Appeal.
- Philip Bostock, Chief Executive, Exeter City Council. For services to Local Government in the South West.
- Professor Mary Bownes, Professor of Development Biology, University of Edinburgh. For services to Science.
- Douglas Turner Boyd, Chair, Macaulay Development Trust. For services to Publicly Funded Research.
- Nick Brayshaw, Chair, Confederation of British Industry Manufacturing Council. For services to Industry.
- Lieutenant Colonel Simon David Richard Wynn Brewis, MBE. For services to the Army Benevolent Fund.
- Professor Charles George Duncan Brown. For services to Tropical Veterinary Medicine.
- Sandra May Brown, Founder, Moira Anderson Foundation. For services to Child Protection in Scotland.
- Julian Burrell, Chair, Wales Tourism Alliance. For services to the Tourist Industry.
- John Burt, Principal and Chief Executive, Angus College. For services to Further Education in Scotland.
- Cliff Bush, Chair, North West Surrey Association of Disabled People. For services to the community in Surrey.
- Peter James Bushell, Chief Executive, Brixham Co-operative Society Limited. For services to Business and to Economic Regeneration in Torbay, Devon.
- Deborah Ann Cadman, Chief Executive, St Edmundsbury Borough Council. For services to Local Government in Suffolk.
- David Gordon Campbell. For services to Homeless People in London.
- Jean Blair Campbell, MBE, Headteacher, Glendale Primary School, Glasgow. For services to Education.
- Wilma Tosh Campbell, board member, Highlands and Islands Enterprise. For services to Economic Development.
- David John Capel, Team Leader, EU Student Finance Team, Higher Education Directorate, Department for Education and Skills.
- Sarah Carr, Founder Member, National Day Nurseries Association. For services to Children and Families.
- Gurinder Chadha, director, Producer and Screenwriter. For services to the British Film Industry.
- Dr. Sheila Ajantha Cheeroth, General Medical Practitioner, Limehouse, London. For services to Refugee Doctors and to Healthcare.
- David Peter Chisnall, Deputy chairman, AsFare Group plc. For services to the Fire Industry.
- Dr. David Chiswell, Chair, Arrow Therapeutics Ltd. For services to the UK Bioscience Industry in the UK and Overseas.
- Beverley Clarke, lately Lead Health Visitor, Community Practitioners and Health Visitors Association. For services to Black and Minority Ethnic Fostering.
- Bernadette Mildred Cleary, Founder, Rainbow Trust Children's Charity. For services to Children with Serious Health Problems.
- David James Clement, Honorary Treasurer, Northern Ireland Council for Voluntary Action. For services to the community in Northern Ireland.
- Gerald Francis Edward Cook, lately vice-chair, Commonwealth Association of Tax Administrators, and Senior Policy Adviser, HM Revenue and Customs.
- Rosalyn Anne Cooper, Health Adviser, Uganda, Department for International Development.
- Joseph Cowan, Chair, Enterprise Ulster. For services to the community in Northern Ireland.
- Raymond Harold Cowlishaw, Chief Executive, Derby City Council. For services to Local Government.
- Hilary Margaret Craik, Headteacher, Stevenson Junior School, Stapleford, Nottinghamshire. For services to Education.
- Caroline, Countess Cranbrook. For services to the Red Meat Industry in the East of England.
- William John Crawford, Elections and Administration Officer, Sunderland City Council. For services to Local Government.
- Michael James Crawshaw, Headteacher, Debenham Church of England Voluntary Controlled High School, Debenham, Suffolk. For services to Education.
- Graham Creelman, managing director, Anglia Television. For services to Broadcasting.
- David McKillop Croft, Governor, HM Prison Edinburgh, HM Prison Service.
- Jeremy Ian Crook, director, Black Training and Enterprise Group. For services to Community Relations and to Diversity.
- Douglas Cross, director, Corporate Services, Tayside Police. For services to the Police.
- Sunny Joyce Crouch, managing director, World Trade Centre, London. For services to Business, Regeneration and Tourism in the UK.
- Edmund Russell Curran, lately Editor, Belfast Telegraph. For services to Journalism.
- Diane Curry, Director of Operations, Partners of Prisoners and Director of Black Prisoners Support Project. For services to Black and Minority Ethnic Prisoners and their families.
- Dr. John Edward Curtis, Keeper, Department of Ancient Near East, British Museum. For services to Museums.
- Charles Dance, Actor and Director. For services to Drama.
- Dr. Naim Eliahou Dangoor. For services to the Jewish Community and to Education.
- Professor Christine Davies, Professor of Physics, University of Glasgow. For services to Science.
- Michael Davison. For services to Sick and Disabled People in Hexham and Newcastle-upon-Tyne.
- Robert Derricott, JP. For services to the Administration of Justice in Gwent.
- Adeline Gilmore Dinsmore, Principal, Ashfield Girls' High School, Belfast. For services to Education.
- Barry John Dodd, Chair and Chief Executive, GSM Group and board member, Yorkshire Forward. For services to Business in the Humber Region and Yorkshire.
- Pauline Dodgson, lately Director, Gateshead Voluntary Organisations Council. For services to the Voluntary Sector.
- Kathy Doran, Chief Executive, Birkenhead and Wallasey Primary Care Trust. For services to the NHS.
- Dr. Pamela Margaret Douglas. For services to Overseas Aid.
- The Reverend Aled Edwards. For charitable services in Wales.
- Brian David Edwards, Governor, HM Young Offenders' Institution and Remand Centre, Glen Parva, Leicester.
- Professor Andrew Christopher Fabian, Head, X-ray Astronomy Group, Institute of Astronomy, University of Cambridge. For services to Science.
- Lorraine Fannin, director, Scottish Publishers' Association. For services to Business.
- Richard Edward Fedorcio, director, Public Affairs, Metropolitan Police Service. For services to the Police.
- David Alexander Ferguson, Holyrood Project Adviser, Scottish Parliament.
- John Francis Fitzpatrick, director, Kent Law Clinic. For services to the Administration of Justice.
- Ian Flower, Divisional Director and Manager, Mott MacDonald Consulting Engineers. For services to Civil Engineering in Wales and to Overseas Development.
- John Francis. For services to the Royal Air Force Museum.
- Neil Franklin, Chief Crown Prosecutor, Crown Prosecution Service.
- William Barrie Fraser. For services to the City of London Corporation and to Education.
- Anthony Peter Freud, lately General Director, Welsh National Opera. For services to Music.
- Alistair Byres Gammell, director, International Conservation, Royal Society for the Protection of Birds. For services to Conservation.
- Patricia Gretton Gibson, Director of Investigation, Office of the Northern Ireland Ombudsman.
- Satnam Singh Gill, Principal, Working Men's College, London. For services to Further Education.
- Ishbel Gilroy, Headteacher, Central Primary School, Inverness. For services to the Gaelic Language and to Education.
- James Goodfellow, Patentor of the Personal Identification Number (PIN). For services to Banking.
- Richard Ernest Gooding, managing director, London City Airport. For services to Aviation.
- Francesca Marion Graham. For public service.
- William Graham, Principal Officer, Housing Division, Department for Social Development, Northern Ireland Executive.
- Meryl Gravell, MBE, Presiding Officer, Welsh Local Government Association. For services to Local Government in Wales and to the community in Carmarthenshire.
- Gillian Patricia Green, Head, UK Grants, Comic Relief. For services to Victims of Domestic Violence.
- Lucinda Jane Guinness, Handbag Designer. For services to the Fashion Industry.
- Professor John Davis Hamilton, Past Academic-Director, Pre-Clinical Programme, University of Durham. For services to Medical Education.
- Anthony John Hammersley, TD, JP, Area Director, Compliance, HM Revenue and Customs.
- Geoffrey Thomas Harding, lately Civil and Structural Engineer, Buildings Division Branch, Office of the Deputy Prime Minister.
- Christopher Andrew Harper, Court Manager, Southwark Crown Court, Her Majesty's Courts Service.
- Brian Harvey, lately Acting Chief Executive, Legal Services Commission. For services to the Administration of Justice.
- Reginald George Leslie Haydon, Chair, Tenant Farmers Association. For services to the Agricultural Industry.
- Barbara Hearn, Deputy Chief Executive and director, Policy and Research, National Children's Bureau. For services to Children, Young People and Families.
- James William Heselden, director, Hesco Bastion. For services to the Defence Industry and to Charity.
- Dr. Nigel Hewett, Chair, Leicester Rough Sleepers Multi-disciplinary Team. For services to Homeless People.
- Angela Hewitt, OC, Pianist. For services to Music.
- David Arthur Hillman, TD, Head, Marriages and Civil Partnerships Branch, General Register Office.
- Randolph Hodgson, Chair, Specialist Cheesemakers' Association. For services to the Dairy Industry.
- Ian Alisdair Lawrence Hogg. For services to Scottish Rugby Union.
- Dr. Richard Hogg, Head, Sierra Leone Office, Department for International Development.
- Philippa Holland, Director of Local Government Practice, Government Office for the West Midlands, Department for Communities and Local Government.
- Michael Stuart Hunter, Head, Shipping Safety Branch, Maritime and Coastguard Agency.
- Peter Basil Hunter. For services to Economic Regeneration in Northern Ireland.
- John Christopher Hutchings, lately Assistant Chief Inspector of Probation. For services to the National Probation Service.
- Lesley Irving, Head, Race, Religion and Refugee, Integration Team, Development Department, Scottish Executive.
- Dr. Jack Jackson, lately HM Assistant Chief Inspector of Education, Scottish Executive.
- Dr. Robert Graham Jezzard, Professional Adviser, Child and Adolescent Mental Health, Department of Health.
- Idwal Alun John. For services to Music in Wales.
- Brian Kearsley, Deputy Director, North West Region, Jobcentre Plus.
- David Fraser Kelly, director, Community Health and Care Partnership, West Lothian Council. For services to Local Government.
- Mark Anthony Kelly, Private Secretary, Government and Opposition Whips Office.
- Professor Alexander George Kemp, Professor of Petroleum Economics, Aberdeen University. For services to the Oil and Gas Industries.
- Dr. Christine Harriott Kennedy. For services to Agriculture and to the Dairy Industry in Northern Ireland.
- Saleem Asghar Kidwai, Chief Executive, Ethnic Business Support Programme Ltd. For services to Diversity and to Business in Wales.
- David Charles Kilshaw, Chair, Scottish Food and Drink Industry Strategy Group. For services to Business.
- David John Kingsley. For charitable services.
- Jo-Anne Tracy Kirkham, Head, VAT Compliance Strategy Performance Management Team, HM Revenue and Customs.
- Alan Paul Knight, chief executive officer, International Animal Rescue. For services to Animal Welfare.
- The Very Reverend Dr. Alexander Francis Knight, lately Dean, Lincoln Cathedral. For services to the Church of England.
- Dr. Peter Raymond Spry Lavender, Director of Research, Development and Information, National Institute of Adult and Continuing Education. For services to Education.
- Geoffrey Leach, Grade B2, Ministry of Defence.
- Karen Leadbitter, Exploration Manager, Shell UK. For services to the Oil and Gas Industries.
- Peter Arthur Lee, lately Chief Executive, Football Foundation. For services to Sport.
- Professor Irene May Leigh, Professor of Cell and Molecular Medicine, Barts and The London, Queen Mary's School of Medicine and Dentistry, University of London. For services to Medicine.
- Professor Michael Anthony Lennon, Chair, British Fluoridation Society. For services to Dental Health.
- Barry Graham Little, Head, Information Management Applications Branch, Office for National Statistics.
- Agnes Philomena Lunny (Mrs. Roberts), Chief Executive, Positive Futures. For services to Disabled People in Northern Ireland.
- David Archer Lynam, Chief Research Scientist, Transport Research Laboratory. For services to Road Safety.
- Julien Macdonald, Designer. For services to the Fashion Industry.
- Dr. Stuart Wyllie MacDonald. For services to Architecture.
- John Angus Mackay, Chief Executive, Gaelic Media Service. For services to Broadcasting in Scotland.
- Nahid Majid, Associate Director, Turner & Townsend (Head of Regeneration PM Sector). For services to Diversity.
- Jonathan Margetts, Grade A, Northern Ireland Office.
- Ian Richard Martin, Grade 6, Asylum Casework Group, Immigration and Nationality Directorate, Home Office.
- Gareth Matthewson, Headteacher, Whitchurch High School, Cardiff. For services to Education in Wales.
- Helen May McClenaghan, Chief Executive, Southern Education and Library Board. For services to Education in Northern Ireland.
- Dr. Gordon McGlone, chief executive officer, Gloucestershire Wildlife Trust. For services to Conservation.
- Sally Mellors, lately Head of Widening Participation, Nottingham Trent University. For services to Higher Education.
- Martin Ambrose Peter Milling, lately Consultant Plastic Surgeon, Morriston Hospital, Swansea. For services to Medicine.
- Josette Bushell-Mingo, Artistic Director, Push. For services to the Arts.
- Jafar Mirza, Chair of Governors, Cambridge Regional College. For services to Further Education.
- Maureen Wallace Moore, Chief Executive, ASH Scotland. For services to Healthcare.
- Dr. Roger Moore, Chief Executive, NHS Appointments Commission, Department of Health.
- Thomas Moore, Headteacher, St Mary's Roman Catholic High School, Chesterfield, Derbyshire. For services to Education.
- Michael Andrew Bridge Morpurgo, MBE, Writer and co-Founder, Farms for City Children. For services to Literature.
- Professor Margaret Elizabeth Mullett, director, Institute of Byzantine Studies and Director of the Gender Initiative, Queen's University, Belfast. For services to Higher Education.
- Linda Nazarko, Consultant Nurse (Older People), Richmond and Twickenham Primary Care Trust, and Visiting Nurse Lecturer, King's College, London. For services to Elderly People.
- Professor David Nethercot, Head, Department of Civil and Environmental Engineering, Imperial College of Science, Technology and Medicine. For services to Structural Engineering.
- Elizabeth Mary Nicholl, MBE, director, UK Sport. For services to Sport.
- James Nicholson, Chair, Down Royal Corporation of Horsebreeders. For services to Horse Racing in Northern Ireland.
- Dr. Paul James Nicholson. For services to Occupational Medicine.
- Malcolm O'Connell, Grade B1, Ministry of Defence.
- Marnie O'Neill, Head, Corporate Relations, BT, Northern Ireland. For services to the Arts.
- Sandy Orr, Executive Chair, City Inn Hotels. For services to the Hospitality Industry.
- Ashley Page, Artistic Director, Scottish Ballet. For services to Dance.
- Dr. Malcolm Parry. Director, University of Surrey Research Park. For services to Business and Education.
- Robert Peel Pearce, HM Principal Inspector of Quarries, Health and Safety Executive.
- Professor Christopher John Peel, lately Technical Director, QinetiQ. For services to the Defence and Aerospace Industries.
- Linda Percival, Customer Service Director, Department of Health.
- Henry Magnus Peterson, lately Deputy Chief Executive, London Borough of Hammersmith and Fulham, and Adviser, London Government Association. For services to Local Government.
- Martin Alan Polden. For services to Environmental Law.
- Sylvia Delores Pomeroy, Chair, Tenants of West Norfolk. For services to the community in Norfolk.
- Alexander Leonard John Pratt, JP. For services to Business and to Education in the South East.
- Dr. Ann Prentice, director, Human Nutrition Research Unit, Medical Research Council. For services to Nutrition.
- Professor Jules Nicholas Pretty, Head, Department of Biological Sciences, University of Essex. For services to Sustainable Agriculture in the UK and Overseas.
- Karen Price, Chief Executive, e-skills UK. For services to the IT Industry.
- Patricia Beryl Purton, director, Royal College of Midwives Scottish Board. For services to Healthcare.
- Frances Harriet Radcliffe, Head, Beef Exports and Transmissible Spongiform Encephalopathy Testing Unit, Department for Environment, Food and Rural Affairs.
- Vivienne Ramsey, Head, Development and Building Control, London Borough of Newham. For services to Local Government.
- Vijith Randeniya, Deputy chief fire officer. For services to the Fire and Rescue Service in the West Midlands.
- Ian Michael Redmond, Chair, Ape Alliance and co-founder, Elefriends and the UK Rhino Group. For services to Conservation.
- John Hunter Gray Reid, Head, People Engagement, The Pension Service.
- John Reilly, Acting Senior Civil Servant, Ministry of Defence.
- Gary Rhodes, Chef. For services to the Hospitality Industry.
- Sister Frances Dorothy Lyon Ritchie, DL, Founder and Trustee, Helen House Children's Hospice and Douglas House Respice for Young Adults. For services to Healthcare.
- Katherine Vivienne Rowe, Principal Manager, Hull Safeguarding Children Board. For services to the Administration of Justice.
- Alison Jane Christina Ruddock, Head of Early Years Service, Islington, London. For services to Education.
- Professor Michael Norton Schmidt, Professor of Poetry, University of Glasgow. For services to Higher Education and to Poetry.
- Leo Rennie Scoon, lawyer, Law and Special Policy Group, Department for Work and Pensions.
- Douglas Selkirk, Headteacher, Heath Park Business and Enterprise College, Wolverhampton. For services to Education.
- David Edwin Seviour, Chief Executive, Leicester Housing Association. For services to Social Housing.
- James Leslie Shaw, Team Leader, Regional Delivery Support Unit, Regions and Regeneration Division, Local Transformation Group, Department for Education and Skills.
- Brigid Mary Simmonds, Chief Executive, Business in Sport and Leisure. For services to Sport.
- Peter Simpson, Principal, Brooke Weston City Technology College, Corby, Northamptonshire. For services to Education.
- Professor Alison Mary Smith, lately Head, Department of Metabolic Biology, John Innes Centre, Norwich. For services to Plant Biochemistry.
- Andrew John Smith, director, Property, Business and Regulatory Services, Hampshire County Council. For services to Local Government.
- Professor William Cairns Stewart Smith, Professor of Public Health, University of Aberdeen. For services to Healthcare.
- John Andrew Spence, MBE, Deputy-Chair, Business in the Community. For services to Charity.
- Julie Spence, Chief Constable, Cambridgeshire Constabulary. For services to the Police.
- Dr. David Spiegelhalter, Research Statistician, Medical Research Council. For services to Medical Research.
- Alastair James Stewart. For services to Broadcasting and to Charity.
- Derek Chesney Stewart, Chair, Gedling Primary Care Trust, Nottingham. For services to Healthcare, particularly Cancer.
- Julie Ann Stokes, Chief Executive, Winston's Wish Charity. For services to Bereaved Children and their Families.
- Professor Colin James Suckling, Freeland Professor of Chemistry, University of Strathclyde. For services to Science and to Higher Education.
- Susan Jean Sutherland, lately Chief Executive, UK Transplant Strategic Health Authority. For services to Organ Transplantation.
- Christopher Swinson, Comptroller and Auditor-General, Jersey, and lately Chair, Treasury's Audit Committee. For services to the Accountancy Profession.
- Frances Sword, Head of Education, Fitzwilliam Museum. For services to Museums.
- Derek Nicholas Tarsh. For services to Relate charities, and to the community in Richmond, Surrey.
- Alexander Taylor, lately Chief Executive, County Durham and Darlington Priority Services NHS Trust. For services to the NHS.
- Robert William Taylor, director, Age Concern, Cymru. For services to Elderly People in Wales.
- Michael Thompson, Founder and managing director, Child Base Nurseries. For services to Children and Families.
- Jennifer Thurston, lately Deputy-general secretary, Prospect. For services to Trade Unions and to the Civil Service.
- John Colin Thwaite, non-executive director, OGCbuying.Solutions. For services to Corporate Governance.
- Professor Andrew Tomkins, director, Centre for International Child Health, Institute of Child Health, University of London. For services to Healthcare in Developing Countries.
- Dr. Michael Frank Treadaway, Director of Research, Fischer Family Trust. For services to Education.
- Susan Lois Underwood, lately Chief Executive, North East Museums, Libraries and Archives Council. For services to Heritage and Museums.
- Gordon John Vickers, Information Systems Development Centre Manager, HM Land Registry.
- Rudolph Walker, Actor. For services to Drama.
- Michael Jeremy Walsby, Chief Executive, APT Enterprise Development. For services to Enterprise Development Overseas.
- John Macgill Watson, Chief Executive, John Watson & Company Ltd. For services to the Printing Industry and to Charity in Scotland.
- Jeremy Waxman, Headteacher, Halifax High at Wellesley Park, Calderdale. For services to Education.
- Wilfred John Weeks, Chair of Trustees, Dulwich Picture Gallery. For services to Art in London.
- Professor Celia Kay Wells, professor, Law School, Cardiff University. For services to Legal Education.
- Peter William Alan West, DL, Secretary, University of Strathclyde. For services to Higher Education in Scotland and Malawi.
- Guy Roderick Westhead, Deputy Director Frontiers, HM Revenue and Customs.
- George Neville James Wheeler, Headteacher, Intake Primary School, Sheffield. For services to Education.
- Barbara White, Founder, When You Wish Upon A Star Charity. For services to Children and Families.
- Alan Wignall, Technical Director, Ultra Electronics Ltd, Sonar and Communication Systems. For services to the Defence Industry.
- Silvaine Margaret Wiles. For services to Black and Minority Ethnic Education.
- Mary Jean Williamson, Dean, School of Art and Design, Nottingham Trent University. For services to Higher Education.
- Susan Willmington, Grade 6, Home Office.
- Andrew Alexander John Willox, Scottish Policy Convenor, Federation of Small Businesses. For services to Business.
- Alan Wilson, Chief Executive, Scottish Council for Development and Industry. For services to Business.
- Richard William Wilson, Chief Estates Surveyor and Project Manager, National Assembly for Wales.
- Nicolette Woodhead, Grade B2, Ministry of Defence.
- Simon Woodroffe, Founder, YO! Sushi/YO! Company. For services to the Hospitality Industry.
- Kenneth Woodward. For services to Health and Safety.
- Dianah Worman, Adviser, Diversity, Chartered Institute of Personnel and Development. For services to Diversity.
- Clive John Wright, Chair, Society for Promoting Christian Knowledge. For services to Business Ethics.
- Ian Robert Young, managing director, Archibald Young Ltd, Founders and Engineers. For services to Engineering in Scotland.

Diplomatic Service and Overseas List

- Dr. Martin John Philip Barber, lately Director, United Nations Mine Action Service. For services to demining.
- Adrian Timothy Neil Chadwick, lately Director, British Council Iraq.
- Georgina Christine. For services to the education of disadvantaged children in Brazil.
- Bernard James Collier. For services to British business interests in South Africa.
- Bernard Cornwell. For services to literature and television production.
- Anne Marie Dewar. For services to the community, Montserrat.
- Alastair Keith Dutch, Counsellor, Foreign and Commonwealth Office.
- Norma Edwards. For services to the community, Falkland Islands.
- Sheila Anne Etherington. For services to healthcare and development in Rwanda.
- Peter William Fell, Senior Education Specialist, British Council.
- Anthony Raymond Fitzjohn. For services to wildlife conservation in East Africa.
- Dr. Michael Francis Gray. For services to British business interests and to victims of the Indian Ocean tsunami in Indonesia.
- Jonathan Peter St. John Harding. For services to charitable causes in Japan and China and to the British community in Japan.
- Kenneth Vivian Hunt. For services to British business interests in India.
- Richard John Paul Hunt, First Secretary, Foreign and Commonwealth Office.
- Michael Hurley, lately First Secretary, British Trade Office, Al Khobar.
- John Nicholas Landers. For services to sustainable agriculture in Brazil.
- David Patrick Lelliott, lately First Secretary, British Embassy, Monrovia.
- Andrew John MacKay, director, British Council, USA.
- Dr. Charles Christopher Patrick McConnachie. For services to healthcare and development in South Africa.
- Jennifer McConnachie. For services to healthcare and development in South Africa.
- William Anthony Frederick Ridout, lately HM Consul, British Consulate-General, Hong Kong.
- Vanda Mary Scott. For services to international co-operation in suicide prevention.
- Captain Peter Desmond Bowen Short. For services to ex-service men and women in Barbados.
- Raymond Inwood Skilling. For services to UK-US relations and to British business interests.
- Ian Arthur Thomas. For services to British business interests in South-East Asia.
- Marcus Boyd Willett, Counsellor, Foreign and Commonwealth Office.
- Graeme Michael Wise, Deputy Consul-General, British Embassy, Washington.
- Dr. Mark Lionel Wood, Consultant Ophthalmologist. For services to blind people in East Africa.

==== Member of the Order of the British Empire (MBE) ====
Military Division

Royal Navy

- Chaplain Thomas Goodwin.
- Warrant Officer 1st Class (Weapon Engineering Mechanic) Mark William Hannibal, D197275A.
- Lieutenant Commander Tristan Timothy Alan Lovering.
- Captain Allan Justin MacKenzie, Canadian Forces (Navy).
- chief petty officer(Diver) John Anthony Meekin, D185562E.
- Warrant Officer 1st Class (Underwater Warfare) Mark Christopher Mortimer, D167872A.
- Warrant Officer 1st Class Royden Brian Scott, Royal Marines, P035572V.
- Warrant Officer 1st Class (Seaman) Stuart Garry Spence, D188579U.
- Warrant Officer 1st Class (Weapon Engineering Artificer) Gordon David Stephen, D140363D.
- Lieutenant (now Acting Lieutenant Commander) Richard James Stone.
- Lieutenant Commander Christopher James Tweed.
- Warrant Officer 1st Class (Marine Engineering Artificer) Paul Winton, D138958P.
- Lieutenant Commander (Sea Cadet Corps) William George Wylie, Royal Naval Reserve.

Army

- Major Martin John Annis (546302), Army Physical Training Corps.
- 24444288 Staff Sergeant Simon Peter Argent, The Royal Logistic Corps, Territorial Army.
- 24630319 Warrant Officer Class 2 Paul Anthony Bayliss, The Royal Logistic Corps.
- Major Barry William Bennett (538921), Royal Regiment of Artillery.
- 24634071 Warrant Officer Class 2 Mark Steven Bennett, Army Physical Training Corps.
- Captain Richard Booth (563314), Royal Regiment of Artillery.
- Major Sheila Margaret Anne Braine (533455), The Royal Logistic Corps.
- Major David Francis Burgess (534058), Corps of Royal Electrical and Mechanical Engineers.
- Major Hugo Ian Moberley Clark (532046), The Royal Regiment of Scotland.
- 23946575 Warrant Officer Class 1 Philip Coomer, The Royal Welsh, Territorial Army.
- 24428312 Staff Sergeant James Douglas Curran, The Royal Logistic Corps, Territorial Army.
- Major Crispin Michael David (543769), The Royal Logistic Corps.
- Q1015909 Warrant Officer Class 2 Elizabeth Anne Deuchars, Royal Army Dental Corps.
- Major Gordon Hutchinson Dick (532047), Army Air Corps.
- The Reverend David Andrew Eaton (543105), Chaplain to the Forces (3rd Class) Royal Army Chaplains' Department, Territorial Army.
- 24771631 Warrant Officer Class 2 Dean Joseph Goldsmith, The Princess of Wales's Royal Regiment.
- 24853461 Staff Sergeant Kevin Gordon Grove, Adjutant General's Corps (Staff and Personnel Support Branch).
- Acting Colonel Robert Ian Hordle (521479), Oxfordshire Army Cadet Force.
- Major Simon Tony Hutchings (535008), The Royal Logistic Corps.
- Major Nicholas Ilic, QGM, (536494), The Light Infantry.
- 25024576 Staff Sergeant Scott Alexander James, Corps of Royal Engineers.
- 24511387 Warrant Officer Class 2 Carl David Jeffries, Army Air Corps.
- Lieutenant Colonel David Jenkins (528494), Adjutant General's Corps (Educational and Training Services Branch).
- 24635358 Warrant Officer Class 2 Geoffrey Simpson Johnson, Irish Guards.
- Major Murray Ian McLeod-Jones (526374), The Parachute Regiment.
- Acting Lieutenant Colonel Rowland Edward Jones (509031), St. John's School Combined Cadet Force.
- Captain Sean Charles Keilty (557401), Royal Corps of Signals.
- Major Katherine Elisabeth Knell (527308), Adjutant General's Corps (Educational and Training Services Branch).
- Acting Major Mark Knight (503013), Cambridgeshire Army Cadet Force.
- F0450274 Colour Sergeant Margaret Alice Lakeman, The Royal Irish Regiment.
- 24592761 Warrant Officer Class 1 David Ian Long, Corps of Royal Electrical Mechanical Engineers.
- 24334699 Colour Sergeant Peter David Mawby, The Parachute Regiment.
- 24863681 Warrant Officer Class 2 Leonard John Maxwell, Royal Army Medical Corps.
- Major Robert Peter McDermott (535827), Royal Regiment of Fusiliers.
- 23976794 Warrant Officer Class 2 Francis McDevitt, The Royal Logistic Corps, Territorial Army.
- 24627734 Sergeant Ian Alexander McNee, Corps of Royal Engineers.
- Major Adam David McRae (538392), The Royal Logistic Corps.
- 24581308 Warrant Officer Class 2 Sean Michael Meaker, Small Arms School Corps.
- Lieutenant Colonel Michael Gillespie Carew O'Dwyer (529728), Irish Guards.
- Major David Quinn, BEM. (540304), Corps of Royal Engineers.
- 24369214 Staff Sergeant Stephen James Roberts, Royal Corps of Signals.
- Captain Peter Robinson (561702), The Yorkshire Regiment.
- 24756973 Warrant Officer Class 2 Steven Alan Robinson, Royal Corps of Signals.
- Major Peter Derek Samuel, TD. (502709), Royal Army Medical Corps, Territorial Army.
- Major James Alastair Scott (522432), The Royal Regiment of Scotland.
- 24731368 Warrant Officer Class 2 Steven Trevor Shepherd, Adjutant Generals' Corps (Royal Military Police).
- Major John Sean Sinclair (540212), General List, Territorial Army.
- 24279628 Warrant Officer Class 2 Henry Rankill Thomas, Adjutant General's Corps (Staff and Personnel Support Branch), Territorial Army.
- Major George Thomas Hamilton Tweedie (544534), The Royal Regiment of Scotland.
- Major Donald Sylvester Urquhart, TD. (524691), The Royal Logistic Corps, Territorial Army.
- Major Marion Mowbray Wilson (537091), Queen Alexandra's Royal Army Nursing Corps, Territorial Army.
- Major Steven Peter Wood (545038), Army Air Corps.

Royal Air Force

- Sergeant Graeme Scott Anderson (L8199549).
- Warrant Officer Ian Michael Brown (T8019492).
- Squadron Leader Mark Cable (8210182D).
- Chief Technician Richard James Chaffey (Q8152678).
- Squadron Leader Andrew William Clucas (5207781G).
- Flight Sergeant Craig Allan Gall (H8252461).
- Squadron Leader Shaun Harris (8153892J).
- Chief Technician Jason David Hill (D8226849).
- Squadron Leader Peter Edwin Charles Johnson (5206216K).
- Squadron Leader Richard Morgan Jones (5208521K).
- Master Aircrew Gordon Thomson Mackenzie (A8011025).
- Sergeant Debra Ann Manning (D8232465).
- Squadron Leader Robert William Moorhouse (8300455K).
- Master Aircrew Timothy James Samwell (L0594634).
- Flight Sergeant John William Shean (G8205931).
- Warrant Officer David Smith (P8008022).
- Sergeant Joseph Cupples Stanfield (L8245628).

Civil Division

- John Abram, TD, JP. For services to the Administration of Justice and to the community in West Mercia.
- Gillian Bernadette Adams. For services to the Administration of Science.
- Bashir Ahmed, Senior Regeneration Manager, Walsall Housing Regeneration Agency. For services to the community in the West Midlands.
- Alan Andrew Aitken. For services to the Boys' Brigade in Inverclyde.
- Dr. Aruna Ajitsaria, Deputy Headteacher, Preston Park Primary School, Brent, London. For services to Education.
- Mohammad Ali, JP. For services to the community in Derby.
- Christine Winifred Allan, leader, Junior Section, 2nd Alton Company Boys' Brigade, Hampshire. For services to Young People.
- David Russel Allan, Captain, 2nd Alton Company, Boys' Brigade, Hampshire. For services to Young People.
- Evelyn Allen, lately Patient Advice and Liaison Services Manager, Doncaster and Bassetlaw Hospitals NHS Foundation Trust. For services to Healthcare.
- Pauline Melody Allen. For services to the community in Tenby, Pembrokeshire.
- Linda Allott, Medical Health Records Manager, Barnsley District General Hospital NHS Trust. For services to the NHS.
- Ernest Michael Amos, journalist, The Northern Echo. For services to Journalism in the North East.
- Dr. Elizabeth Mary Nesbit Andrews, DL, lately Council Member, Countryside Council for Wales, Vice-President of RSPB, and President, Brecknock Wildlife Trust. For services to Nature Conservation.
- Jeanette Marion Appleton. For services to Blind and Partially Sighted People.
- Gwyn Arch. For services to Music in Berkshire.
- William George Armitage. For services to Business and to the community in Letchworth Garden City, Hertfordshire.
- George Leslie Armstrong. For services to Agriculture and to the community in Cumbria.
- Margaret Armstrong. For services to the Arts in Northern Ireland.
- Alice Joyce Arthur, Retained Sub-Officer, Highlands and Islands Fire and Rescue Service. For services to the community in the Shetland Islands.
- John Graham Ashdown, lately Principal Youth Leader, Pensby Youth Club. For services to Young People in the Wirral.
- Philip William Marshall Atkinson, lately Chief Engineer, Maritime Branch, HM Revenue and Customs.
- Rashid Ahmed Awan, President, Pakistan Society of West Yorkshire. For services to Community Relations.
- John Bagley. For services to the community in Dover, Kent.
- Michael Charles Baird. For public service.
- Katrina Mary Baker. For voluntary services to the community in Waters Upton, Shropshire.
- Susan Kitty Baker, JP. For services to the community in Leeds, West Yorkshire.
- John Edward Bamford. For charitable services in Biddulph, Stoke-on-Trent.
- Noel Banks. For services to the community in the Cotswolds and Wiltshire.
- John Henry Bannister. For services to Crofting Agriculture in The Highlands and Islands.
- Ruth Patricia Bannister, Specialist Health Visitor, Central Manchester, and Manchester Children's University Hospitals NHS Trust. For services to Healthcare.
- Glen Barham, Sergeant, Hampshire Constabulary. For services to the Police.
- Kusuma Barnett, Head, Volunteer Service, British Museum. For services to Museums.
- Michael Ian Max Barnett, Stage Designer and Engineer. For services to the Theatre.
- Arthur Thomas Barrett, Food Security and Livelihoods Adviser, Zimbabwe, Department for International Development.
- Dudley Eric Barrow, Group Contact, 16th Sevenoaks Scout Group, Kent. For services to Young People.
- Professor John Barstow, Professor of Piano, Royal College of Music. For services to Music Education.
- Moira Bartlett. For services to the community in Wincanton, Somerset.
- Fitzroy John Batchelor. For services to Black and Minority Ethnic People in the NHS.
- Alan Herbert Bates, DFM. For services to the Warsaw 44 Club.
- William Jason Bates. For services to the Royal British Legion in Hampshire.
- Cheryl Bawden, Executive Officer, The Pension Service.
- Martin Eric Belfort Bax. For services to the Frome Festival and to the community in Frome, Somerset.
- Janet Beech, Youth Worker, Caxton Youth Organisation, Westminster, London. For services to Young Disabled People.
- Dr. Eileen Bentley, director, Oldham Music Service, and Music Adviser, Oldham Local Education Authority. For services to Education.
- Ian John Berry, JP, Councillor, City of Edinburgh Council. For services to Local Government.
- David Bettles, JP. For services to the Administration of Justice in Halton, Cheshire.
- Sudarshan Bhuhi. For services to the Asian community in East London.
- Margaret Elizabeth Bicker, Chair, Belfast Music Society. For services to Music in Northern Ireland.
- The Reverend Elizabeth Binns, Assistant Principal Librarian. For services to Local Government in Bury, Greater Manchester.
- Valerie Ann Bishop, Grade E2, Ministry of Defence.
- Adele Blakeborough, Chief Executive, Community Action Network. For services to Social Enterprise.
- Ninian Vernon Le Blanc, director, Diversity and Inclusion, Royal Mail. For charitable services.
- Philip Jackson Bland, Asset Strategy and Planning Director, United Utilities Water plc. For services to the Water Industry.
- Michael Langley Blomer, Chair, Herefordshire Housing. For services to the community in the South Midlands.
- Arthur Allen Bodgers, JP, Youth Leader, Manchester Youth Service. For services to Young People.
- Shirley Ann Bowater. For services to The James Cook University Hospital NHS Trust, Radiotherapy and Oncology Department and Holistic Cancer Care Project.
- Margaret Anne Bowdery, President and Footpaths Secretary, East Berkshire Branch, Ramblers' Association. For services to Walking.
- Catriona Paterson Boyce. For services to the community in Brighton, East Sussex.
- Martie Boyd, Executive Director, Ulster Garden Villages Ltd. For services to the community in Northern Ireland.
- Allan James Brady, Acting Deputy Governor, HM Prison and Young Offenders' Institution Holloway, HM Prison Service.
- Patricia Braman, Founder and Chair, Mulberry Heart Association. For services to Healthcare in East London.
- William James (Liam) Braniff. For services to the community in Northern Ireland.
- Alene Branton, Founder and former director, National Neighbourhood Watch Association, Humberside Police. For services to the community in Humberside.
- Dr. Anne Dorothea Brian. For services to Conservation in Herefordshire.
- Thomas Wilfred Peter Bridges, JP, DL. For services to the community in Oxford.
- Graham Nigel Broom, director, IS/IT, Cambridgeshire Constabulary. For services to the Police.
- Constance Ann Brown, Fish and Chip Shop Proprietor. For services to Business and to the community in Pembrokeshire.
- Mervyn Sherwood Brown. For services to People with Heart Problems in Harrow and Brent, Greater London.
- William John Brown, Chair, Engineering Training Council. For services to the Engineering Industry in Northern Ireland.
- Joanna Bruce, leader, Teme Valley Youth Project, Herefordshire. For services to Young People.
- Dr. George Arthur Buckley, Member, Rushcliffe Borough Council. For services to Local Government in the East Midlands.
- Margaret Isobel Mae Burke, director, Academic and Information Services, Stranmillis University College, Belfast. For services to Higher Education.
- Herbert Noel Burns. For services to Animal Health.
- Colin Busby, Deputy Headteacher, Lady Margaret Secondary School, Fulham, London. For services to Education.
- Lieutenant Commander (S) Reginald William Bush, Royal Naval Volunteer Reserve. For services to the community in Sandon, Essex.
- Sarah Frances Bush, lately Staff Disability Network Co-ordinator, HM Revenue and Customs.
- Dr. Christopher John Butler, lately Research Astronomer, Armagh Observatory. For services to Science.
- Dr. Robin David Buxton, Chair, Northmoor Trust and Oxford Nature Conservation Forum. For services to the Environment.
- Michael Landon Byrne. For services to Disabled Children in the Wirral, Merseyside.
- Peggy Cadwallader. For services to the community in North East Lincolnshire.
- Michael Andrew Caines, Chef. For services to the Hospitality Industry.
- George Anthony Caldwell. For charitable services for the Leukaemia Research Fund.
- Jean Henderson Cameron. For services to the Girls' Brigade in the Lothians.
- Margaret Jean Cann, Administrative Assistant, Child Support Agency.
- Frederick William Carder, TD. For services to the community in Whitmore, Staffordshire.
- Mary Phyllis Case. For services to the Funeral Profession.
- John Gilbert Henry Cave. For services to the Holyhead Maritime Museum and to the community in Holyhead, Anglesey.
- Hussein Chalayan, Designer. For services to the Fashion Industry.
- Thomas Joseph Chambers, Principal Teacher, Art and Design, Govan High School, Glasgow. For services to Education.
- Robert Chase, Senior Chief Pacemaker Technician, Southampton University Hospitals NHS Trust. For services to the NHS.
- Christine Mary Cheape, Triple Duty Nurse, Blair Atholl, Perthshire. For services to Healthcare.
- Hugh Gordon Chubb. For services to the community in Surrey.
- Catherine McDonald Clark. For services to Enable in Dunbartonshire.
- Eileen Elisabeth Clayton. For services to the Ffestiniog Railway, North Wales.
- Christopher John Mansell Coburn. For services to Inland Waterways.
- Dilys Elizabeth Colbourne. For services to the community in Barry, Vale of Glamorgan.
- Sue Cole. For services to the community in Meigle, Perthshire.
- John Collier. For services to the community in Warwickshire.
- Joyce Helen Conway, Staff-Side Lead, Agenda for Change Project, Queen Elizabeth Hospital, London NHS Trust. For services to the NHS.
- Brian Francis Conyon, President, Cornwall County Football Association. For services to Sport.
- Kathleen Cook, lately Teaching Assistant, Highover JMI School, Hitchin, Hertfordshire. For services to Education.
- Marian Cook. For services to the Anwen Little Theatre, Barry, Vale of Glamorgan.
- Alan Cooke. For services to the community in Fleetwood, Lancashire.
- John Frederick Cooper. For services to the community in Lancashire.
- Agnes Cormack, Chair, Linthouse Housing Association. For services to Social Housing in Glasgow.
- Councillor Malcolm Franciscoe James Cotterell, Member, Fenland District Council. For services to the community in Wisbech, Cambridgeshire.
- Anne Margaret Cowan. For services to the community in Great Yarmouth, Norfolk.
- Rosemary Cox. For services to Victim Support and to the community in Epsom and Ewell, Surrey.
- Audrey Cranmer, Foster Carer, North Yorkshire. For services to Children and Families.
- Keith Cranmer, Foster Carer, North Yorkshire. For services to Children and Families.
- Andrew Kent Crawford. For services to the community in Linlithgow, West Lothian.
- David Henry Crawshaw, Regional Catchment Manager, United Utilities plc. For services to the Water Industry.
- Amanda Clare Croome. For services to Homeless People in Manchester.
- Dr. George Brian Crosby. For services to Durham Cathedral.
- Diana Cramond Cross. For services to the community in St. Austell, Cornwall.
- Craig Crowley, Chair, UK Deaf Sport. For services to Sport.
- Michael John Croxford, lately Head, Newport Wastesavers. For services to the Environment in Wales.
- Harrington Delisle Cumberbatch. For services to African Caribbean People with Mental Health Problems in Tower Hamlets, London.
- Stephen Buchanan Curtis, Powerboat Racer. For services to Sport.
- Beatrice Cuthbertson. For services to the community in Darlington, County Durham.
- Kenneth McKenzie-Cyrus. For services to the Royal Hospital, Chelsea, London.
- Joan Dales. For services to Nursing in Northern Ireland.
- Myrtle Drury-Dalzell. For services to the community in Northern Ireland.
- Robert Ernest Molyneux Davey. For services to Church Restoration in Norfolk.
- Dr. David Cunningham Davidson, General Medical Practitioner and Primary Care Lead, Have a Heart Paisley. For services to Healthcare in the West of Scotland.
- Gillean Mary Irene Davidson. For services to Children in the UK and India.
- Bryan Davies, Outreach Worker in East Durham. For services to Young People.
- Marion Gertrude Davies, Teaching Assistant, Horbury Primary School, Wakefield, West Yorkshire. For services to Education.
- Peter Dawson, Head of Year, Copleston High School, Ipswich, Suffolk. For services to Education.
- Wendy Christine Daykin, Foster Carer, Sheffield City Council. For services to Children and Families.
- Ann Tydd Daymond, Chair, The Towersey Foundation. For services to Terminally Ill People.
- Geraldine Debenham, Hospital Voluntary Services Manager, West Suffolk Hospital NHS Trust. For services to the NHS.
- Carole Dennis. For services to Neighbourhood Watch in Colchester, Essex.
- Catherine Derries. For services to the community in Cardross, Argyll and Bute.
- Linda Dewis, Senior Youth Worker, Coventry City Council. For services to Young People.
- Mohindra Dhall, Founder, Scottish Indian Arts Forum. For services to the Arts in Scotland.
- Avril Diplock, Headteacher, Trefechan Nursery School. For services to Early Years Education and to the community in Merthyr Tydfil, South Wales.
- Gerard Docherty, Managing Director, Real Time Engineering. For services to Industry.
- Adrian Matthew Donaldson, Chief Executive, Castlereagh Borough Council. For services to Local Government in Northern Ireland.
- Margaret Douglas, Office Manager, Lancashire Police. For services to the Police.
- Catherine Ann Dowling, Head of Midwifery, Bro Morgannwg NHS Trust. For services to the NHS in Wales.
- David Down. For services to the Sea Training Corps in Great Yarmouth.
- Patricia Ann Downing, Vice-Chair, Kent Ambulance Service NHS Trust. For services to the NHS.
- Andrew Doyle, Chair, Enable Advisory Committee. For services to People with Learning Disabilities in Scotland.
- Rita Anne Drake, lately Messenger, Department of Trade and Industry.
- Canon Richard Draper, Founder and Project Director, Benjamin Foundation. For services to Young People in North Norfolk.
- David Ernest Drew. For services to Dance.
- Zillah Elizabeth Driver. For services to the community in Hertford.
- Barry Stephen Duffin, Site Manager, Titchfield Haven National Nature Reserve. For services to Nature Conservation in Hampshire.
- The Reverend Angela Marion Dugdale, DL, Musical Director, Kelling Choirs. For services to Music.
- Anne Winifred Swinnerton Dyer, Trustee, Westhope Craft College, Craven Arms, Shropshire. For services to Learning and to Skills.
- Raymond Henry Dyer, director, Suffolk Young People's Theatre. For services to Drama.
- Ruth Eagles, Education Manager, HM Prison and Young Offenders' Institution, Cookham Wood, Rochester. For services to the community in Kent.
- Joseph Henry Eagleson, Chief Executive, Enterprise Ulster. For services to Training and to the community in Northern Ireland.
- Edward Percy Earle, Clerk of Works, Royal Alexandra and Albert School, Reigate, Surrey. For services to Education.
- John Denzil Ede, Member, Mayor of Bath's Corps of Honorary Guides. For services to the Tourist Industry in Bath, Somerset.
- Glyn Edwards, Chief Executive, Antisoma plc. For services to the Biotechnology Industry.
- Jill Edwards. For services to Golf in Wales.
- Alexander Wilson Elliott, Chair, Killesher and Cleenish Community Care Association. For services to the community in Northern Ireland.
- Doreen Ellis, Senior Executive Officer, The Pension Service.
- Geoffrey Ellis. For public service.
- Angela Joy Elmy, Usher, Alton Magistrates Court, Her Majesty's Courts Service.
- Peter English, JP, DL. For services to the community in Mid-Wales.
- John Erskine. For services to the community in Merseyside.
- Florence Elizabeth Essex. For services to the community in Yeovil, Somerset.
- James Essex. For services to the community in Yeovil, Somerset.
- Dr. Barbara Karyn Wynne-Evans, lately General Medical Practitioner, Rhayader, Powys. For services to Healthcare.
- Hilary Anne Evans, Departmental Records Officer, Health and Safety Executive.
- Gordon Edwin Everard, Principal Officer, HM Prison Lancaster Castle, HM Prison Service.
- Patricia Farrington. For services to Radiography and to the community in Islay.
- Valerie Dawn Fear. For services to Disabled People in Bath.
- Angela Fenwick, lately Manager Detection, HM Revenue and Customs.
- Barry Ferguson, Captain, Glasgow Rangers Football Team and Scotland Team Captain. For services to Sport.
- Gerald Robin Arthur Ferrett. For services to the Royal British Legion.
- John Ferrington, Chair of Governors, Ercall Wood Technology College, Telford. For services to Education.
- Carol Rees-Field, lately Teacher, Ysgol Gwaenynog, Denbigh. For services to Primary Education in Denbighshire.
- Hilda Fielding. For services to People with Learning Disabilities in Lancashire.
- Henry John Dunn Finchett. For services to the community in Somerset.
- John Herbert Fitzjohn, Head, Community Fire Safety, Mid and West Wales Fire Authority. For services to the Fire and Rescue Service.
- Melvin John Fletcher, Parking Control Officer, Nottingham Trent University. For services to Higher Education.
- Michael Flynn, Superintendent, Scottish Society for the Prevention of Cruelty to Animals. For services to Animal Welfare in Scotland.
- Kenneth Desmond Forbes, director, Environmental Services, Banbridge District Council. For services to Local Government in Northern Ireland.
- Sarah Jane Fort, Grade E1, Ministry of Defence.
- Hugh Morrison Foster, President, Northern Ireland Cycling Federation, and Manager, Northern Ireland Commonwealth Games 2006 Cycling Squad. For services to Sport.
- Doreen Fowler, Operational Support Grade, HM Prison and Young Offenders' Institution Styal, Cheshire, HM Prison Service.
- Alexander James Hall Fox. For services to the community in Staffordshire.
- Marjorie Joan Francis. For services to the Agricultural community in Carmarthenshire.
- Gloria Penelope Fraser. For services to Healthcare in Maidenhead, Berkshire.
- Gerald Frobisher. For services to the Voluntary Sector and to the community in Denbighshire.
- Angela Fugaccia, Waitress. For services to the Hospitality Industry.
- Donald Spiers Fullarton. For services to the community in Helensburgh, Dunbartonshire.
- Judith Ann Gain. For services to the community in Farnham, Surrey.
- John Stuart Gallagher, director, Pell Frischmann Consulting Engineers. For services to the Civil Engineering Industry.
- Sylvia Lawson Gallagher. For services to the community in Cumbria and Overseas.
- Colin Gardner. For charitable services in Gloucester.
- Garry Garmston, Watch Manager, Humberside Fire and Rescue Service. For services to the community in the East Riding of Yorkshire.
- Felicity Jane Gault, Volunteer Learning Support Assistant, St. Mary and St. Paul's First School, South Harting, Hampshire. For services to Education.
- David Scarffe Gawne. For services to Crossroads Caring for Carers in the Isle of Man.
- Dr. John Geater. For charitable services.
- John William George, Bus Driver, Travel Coventry. For services to Public Transport and to Charity.
- William Gibson, Prison Officer, HM Prison and Young Offenders' Institution Onley, Warwickshire, HM Prison Service.
- Hugh Gilgunn, Technician, East Down Institute of Further and Higher Education. For services to Further Education and to Training in Northern Ireland.
- Andrew John Gillman, Grade C1, Ministry of Defence.
- Graham Goode, Head of Furnishing, Palace of Westminster.
- Brian Goodfellow, director, Safeguard Health & Safety Limited. For services to Health and Safety in Northern Ireland.
- John Strathearn Gordon, JP. For services to the community in Newport, Essex.
- Jean Gorringe, School Crossing Warden, St. James Primary School, Westhoughton, Lancashire. For services to Education.
- John Meldon Govier. For services to the community and to the Royal National Lifeboat Institution in Sidmouth, Devon.
- Marvin John Gowdy. For services to the St. John Ambulance Brigade.
- Dr. John Francis Grace, General Medical Practitioner, Higham, Rochester. For services to Healthcare.
- Allan James Grafton, JP. For services to the community in Gorton, Manchester.
- Katherine Grainger, Rower. For services to Sport.
- Philip Richard Greed. For services to Agriculture in Devon.
- Andrew Kenneth Francis Green, Chair, Headway Charity. For services to the community in Jersey.
- Carol Green. For services to the Barnsley Blind and Partially Sighted Association in South Yorkshire.
- Margaret Ann Greiff. For services to Inter Care (Medicines for Africa).
- Judith Ann Griffin, JP, DL. For services to the community in the Isle of Wight.
- Gillian Grigg. For services to War Pensioners.
- David Richard Groom, Highways Maintenance Engineer, Cambridgeshire County Council. For services to Local Government.
- Sheila Gupta, Director of Human Resources, City University. For services to Higher Education.
- Denzil Lewis Hackford, Chair, Governing Body Ysgol Penmaes, Brecon. For services to Education in Powys.
- Eileen Hales, Health Care Assistant and UNISON Steward, Northamptonshire Healthcare NHS Trust. For services to the NHS.
- Christopher David Hall. For services to Medical Research.
- Joy Suzanne Hall. For services to the community in South East London.
- Simon Andrew Dalton Hall. For services to Charity and to Education.
- David Stewart Hamilton, lately Legal Adviser, Metropolitan Police Service. For services to the Police.
- Judith Handford. For services to the community in Leicestershire.
- Paul Handford, Sergeant, West Midlands Police. For services to the Police.
- Margaret Hands, lately Service Manager for Older People, Ceredigion. For services to Social Care.
- Byron Hanna, Chair, Hartlepool New Deal for Communities. For services to the community in Hartlepool.
- Margaret Millar Harcus. For services to the community in Papa Westray, Orkney Isles.
- Philip Rolf Harding, Head, Sustainable Business, Government Office for the South West, Department for Communities and Local Government.
- Janet Harris, President, Selsey Carers' Support Group. For services to the community in Selsey, West Sussex.
- Margaret Buckley-Harris. For services to Cancer Services in Wales.
- Catherine Winifred Beatrice Hart, Home Help, Homefirst Community Trust. For services to the community in Northern Ireland.
- John Patrick Hawker. For services to Radio Communications.
- Tracy Hegarty, board member, Women in Enterprise. For services to Business in Northern Ireland.
- Christopher Heitzmann. For services to the community in Berkshire.
- Elizabeth Hellmich. For services to the community in Bradford, West Yorkshire.
- Gerardine Hemingway, Founder, Red or Dead and Hemingway Design. For services to the Design and Fashion Industries.
- Wayne Andrew Hemingway, Founder, Red or Dead and Hemingway Design. For services to the Design and Fashion Industries.
- Ann Laird Henderson. For services to the Girl Guides in Scotland.
- Arthur Thomas Henderson, Chair, Board of Governors, Linn Primary School, Larne. For services to Education in Northern Ireland.
- Russell Audley Ferdinand Henderson. For services to Music.
- Thomas Alexander Henderson, Production Computer Aided Design Technician, Babcock Engineering Services. For services to the Defence Industry.
- Irene Hendrie, Administration Officer, Jobcentre Plus.
- Michael John Hepworth, JP, Senior Professional Technology Officer, Vehicle Certification Agency.
- Major James Anthony Hibbert, MC. For services to Tourism and to Sailing in Cornwall.
- Jean Elizabeth Higham. For services to OXFAM.
- Karen Hill, Grade C1, Ministry of Defence.
- Yvonne Hill, Headteacher, Great Ormond Street Hospital School, London. For services to Education.
- Dr. Brian John Coles Hinton, Honorary Librarian, Julia Margaret Cameron Trust. For services to the Arts.
- Susan Jane Hoggarth, JP. For services to the community in Warminster, Wiltshire.
- Barbara Joan Holmes, Manager, Criminal Justice Unit, Essex Police. For services to the Criminal Justice System in Essex.
- Sara Jane Helen Holmes, Head, School for Dental Care Professionals, University of Portsmouth. For services to Dental Education.
- Alan Geoffrey Hopper. For services to the Fishing Industry.
- Simon Paterson Horsburgh, Higher Investigation Officer, HM Revenue and Customs.
- Colin Leslie Howell, Senior Executive Officer, Driver and Vehicle Licensing Agency.
- Desiree Howells. For services to the Catholic Agency for Overseas Development.
- Richard John Hudson, Swimmer. For services to Disabled Sport.
- Hilary Hughes. For services to Home Caring in Conwy.
- The Reverend Vera Susan Henrietta Hunt. For services to the Spiritual Needs of Deaf People and to the community in Hayes, Middlesex.
- Rubina-Ishrat Hussain, JP. For services to the community in Peterborough, Cambridgeshire.
- Michael Stephen Hutchinson, Youth Leader, York. For services to Young People.
- Ellen Iddon. For services to the community in West Lancashire.
- Kenneth Vincent Iddon, lately President, British Printing Industries Federation. For services to the Print Industry.
- Dr. George Edward Inglis, Strategy Development Manager. For services to the Scottish National Blood Transfusion Service.
- Evelyn Innes, Health Care Assistant, Luton. For services to Healthcare.
- Janine Mireille Irons, Managing Director, The Dune Music Company Ltd and Tomorrow's Warriors Ltd. For services to the Music Industry.
- Robert Jack. For services to Bowls.
- Shirley Angela Jackson. For services to the Insolvency Profession.
- Rabbi Harry Martin Jacobi. For services to the Anglo-Jewish Community.
- Ian Richard Ernest James, Detective Sergeant, Cleveland Police. For services to the Police.
- Audrey Charmaine Jayetilleke. For services to the Sri Lanka Christian Association and to Community Relations in the UK.
- Michael Henry Vickery Jeans, Independent board member, Delivery Challenge Group, Department of Trade and Industry. For public and charitable services.
- Elcena Jeffers. For services to the community in South Kilburn, London.
- Diane Jehu, Macmillan Breast Cancer Clinical Nurse Specialist, North Glamorgan NHS Trust. For services to Healthcare.
- Stella Jenkin. For services to Newquay Hospital League of Friends and to the community in Newquay, Cornwall.
- Geraint Jenkins, Head of Geography, de Stafford School, Caterham, Surrey. For services to Education.
- Stuart David Frederick Jenkins, Personal Adviser, Connexions Cornwall and Devon. For services to Young People.
- Margaret Kay Jepson, Chair, Homewatch Association, Merseyside Police. For services to the community in Merseyside.
- James Antony Jex. For services to Business and to the community in North East Lincolnshire.
- Howard Johnson, Administrative Officer, Richard Ley Development Centre, Driver and Vehicle Licensing Agency.
- Kathleen Una Johnson. For services to the Royal Navy in the Isle of Man.
- Madeline Johnson, teacher, Castle Hill Infant School, Ipswich, Suffolk. For services to Education.
- Margaret Johnson. For services to the Immigration Removal Centres Independent Monitoring Board.
- Rosemary Peta Johnson. For services to the learning disabled in Woking, Surrey.
- William Johnson, Founder and Treasurer, Kircubbin, Portaferry and District Ploughing Society. For services to the community in Northern Ireland.
- Elisabeth Mary Johnston. For services to the community in the Isle of Bute, Scotland.
- Hannah Rita Jones, Head, Farm Liaison Team, National Assembly for Wales.
- Kathleen Jones, Community Midwife, North East Wales NHS Trust. For services to the Traveller's Community in Wales.
- Marie Jones, lately Mid-day Meals Supervisor, St. John's Roman Catholic Primary School, Gravesend, Kent. For services to Education.
- Philip Jones. For services to the community in North Wales.
- Pamela Mary Jordan, Member of the Corporation, College of North West London. For services to Further Education.
- Stephen Frederick Joynes, Hotel Proprietor. For services to the Hospitality Industry in the Midlands.
- Helen Kane. For services to the Credit Union Movement in Glasgow.
- Annabel Karmel. For services to Nutrition for Children.
- Jackie Kay, Poet and Novelist. For services to Literature.
- Ann Keane, Messenger, Cabinet Office.
- Alice Keenan. For services to Children in Alnwick, Northumberland.
- John Kennedy. For services to Music in Northern Ireland.
- Rhoda Elizabeth Key. For services to Macmillan Cancer Relief (Brixham Committee), Devon.
- Elaine Kilgannon, Cancer Services Lead Manager, South Tyneside NHS Trust. For services to the NHS.
- Graham John King, President, Bournemouth Battalion Boys' Brigade. For services to Young People.
- Allan Macdonald Knapp. For services to the community in Oldbury-on-Severn, Gloucestershire.
- Beverley Knight. Singer. For services to Music.
- Alan Knights. For services to the Environment in the South West.
- Karen Elisabeth Knowles, New Deal for Communities Outreach Worker, Jobcentre Plus.
- Bernard Lancaster, Coach and co-Founder, Banks Gymnastics Club. For services to Sport in the North West.
- Valerie Ann Lancaster, Coach and co-Founder, Banks Gymnastics Club. For services to Sport in the North West.
- Evelyn Isabella Lang, Finance Director, Motherwell Citizens' Advice Bureau. For services to the community in Lanarkshire.
- Squadron Leader Norman Roger Langdon, BEM, Royal Air Force (Retd). For services to the Royal Air Force Benevolent Fund.
- George Llewellyn Law, Chair, Spitalfields Festival. For services to the community in Spitalfields, London.
- Alan Lawton. For services to Brass Band Music.
- Irene Layton. For services to the community in Halesowen, West Midlands.
- Christopher Ledger. For services to the Sea Cadet Corps in the South.
- Judith Lehmann, Head, Library Services, Brighton and Sussex University Hospitals NHS Trust. For services to NHS Libraries.
- Sharon Leigh, Domestic, Hope Hospital, Salford Royal Hospitals NHS Trust. For services to the NHS.
- Connie Leith, Conservation Officer, Ferryhill Heritage Society. For services to Heritage in Aberdeen.
- Ann Elizabeth Lewis, Audio Typist and Clerk, Ashford Employment Tribunal Office, Department for Constitutional Affairs.
- Dr. Graham John Lewis, Professional Executive Committee Chair, Richmond and Twickenham Primary Care Trust and London Primary Care Modernisation Lead. For services to the NHS.
- Christopher Leyland. For services to Elderly People and to the community in Belford, Northumberland.
- Carmen Lindsay, Founder and Project Manager, Camberwell After School Project, Southwark, London. For services to Children and Families.
- Kathleen Linnegan. For services to the community in Northern Ireland.
- Denise Hermina Lintern. For services to the community in Maidstone, Kent.
- Roger Noel Linton, co-Owner, St. Mary's Historic House and Gardens, Bramber, West Sussex. For services to Conservation and the Arts.
- William Jeffrey Holmes Lodge. For services to the Royal British Legion.
- Judith Eileen Lorimer. For services to the community in Troon, Ayrshire.
- John William Love. For public service.
- Patricia Ann Lovell, Senior Selector, England Women's Cricket Team. For services to Sport.
- Eric Harold Jackson Lowe. For services to Older People in Cumbria.
- Pauline Lowe, lately Laboratory Manager, City Hospital, Birmingham. For services to the NHS.
- David Luckes. For services to the London 2012 Olympic Bid.
- William Leslie Lyness. For public service.
- Christina Macdonald. For services to Crofting and to the community in North Uist, Western Isles.
- John Mackenzie, President, Camanachd Association. For services to Shinty.
- Professor William James Maclean, Research Professor of Fine Art, University of Dundee. For services to Higher Education and to Art.
- Lyndall MacWilliam. For services to the Royal Blind School, Edinburgh.
- Thomas Merlin Maddock, Designer and Inventor. For services to Business and to the community in South Wales and Stafford County Town.
- Councillor Stanley William Madeley. For services to the community in Walsall, West Midlands.
- Irene Margaret Magee. For public service.
- Diana Maiden, Paediatric Support Team, Worcestershire South Portage Service. For services to Children with Special Educational Needs.
- Michael John De Maine, R.D, Senior Scientist, Scottish Crop Research Institute. For services to Agricultural and Biological Research.
- Geslyn Agatha Malcom, Treasurer, Pineapple Luncheon Club. For services to Black and Minority Ethnic People in South East London.
- Hugh Malone. For services to the community in Consett, County Durham.
- Sylvana Mansell. For services to the community in Brightside, Sheffield.
- Josephine Marley, Executive Director, Bryson House, Belfast. For services to the community in Northern Ireland.
- Dr. John Christopher Marsden. For services to Biology.
- Peter Marsh, Technical Director of Informatics, Wirral Hospitals NHS Trust. For services to the NHS.
- John Brian Marshall, Head, Community Services, Hull Goodwin Development Trust. For services to the community in Hull.
- Patricia Evylnne Marshall. For services to the community in Maidstone, Kent.
- Caroline Ruth Martin, lately Domestic Assistant, Limegrove Special School, Limavady. For services to Education in Northern Ireland.
- Graham Angus Facks-Martin, Member, North Cornwall District Council. For services to the community in North Cornwall.
- Harry Mason. For services to the community in West Yorkshire.
- Norah Eileen Mason. For services to the community in Edingale, Staffordshire.
- Michael Hugh McAteer, Grade D, Ministry of Defence.
- Shirley-Ann McBride, Executive Officer, Child Support Agency.
- Olwyn McCarthy, Head Chef, Hillsborough Castle.
- Peter McCrea, Library Assistant, Belfast Library. For services to Local Government in Northern Ireland.
- Robert William McDonald. For public service.
- Margaret O'Neil McDonaugh. For services to the Guernsey Youth Theatre.
- William McDougall. Head of Security, Hampden Park, Glasgow. For services to Football.
- Catherine McGeoghan. For charitable services.
- Stuart McInnes, Chair, City of London Drug Abuse Resistance Education Programme. For services to Disadvantaged People.
- Dr. Ian Hume McKee, lately General Medical Practitioner, NHS Lothian. For services to Healthcare.
- Niall McShea, Rally Driver. For services to Motor Sport.
- Kenneth Measor, lately Leader, 2nd Hartlepool Boys' Brigade Company. For services to Young People.
- Jeannie Diana Mee, lately Head, Allied Health Professions, West London Mental Health Trust. For services to Healthcare.
- Antoinette Meredew. For services to the community in East London.
- Dorothy Ann Meredith. For services to the Witness Service in Greater Manchester.
- Derek Lawrence Miles, Chief Dental Equipment Technician, University Dental Hospital, Cardiff. For services to the NHS in Wales.
- Susan Elizabeth Miles. For services to the community in Newport, Shropshire.
- Valerie Miller. For services to the community in Melrose, Scotland.
- Hilary Patricia Millett, Medical Secretary, Anaesthetic Department, Great Western Hospital, Swindon. For services to the NHS.
- Robert Paul Millington, lately Assistant Principal, City College Coventry. For services to Further Education and to Engineering Training.
- Valerie Ann Mills, Housekeeper, Acute Neurology and Acute Stroke Units, Salford Royal Hospitals NHS Trust. For services to the NHS.
- Sheffie Boysie Mohammed, Councillor, Stroud District Council. For services to the community in Gloucestershire.
- Peter James Mole, Member, Gateshead Metropolitan Borough Council. For services to Local Government.
- Selma Hope Montford. For services to Urban Conservation in Brighton and Hove, East Sussex.
- Reginald Montgomery. For services to the Fishing Industry in Northern Ireland.
- Irene Helena Morgan. For services to the community in Caernarfon, Gwynedd.
- Dewi Jones Morris, board member, Derwent Living. For services to Housing in the East Midlands.
- Gerald Hornby Moxon, Council Member, Yorkshire Beekeepers' Association. For services to the Beekeeping Industry.
- Stella Rose Muncaster, School Crossing Warden, London Borough of Hillingdon. For services to Education.
- Doreen Elizabeth Ann Muskett, Chair, Northern Ireland Amenity Council. For services to the Environment.
- Sittika Nazim, Conference Organiser, Institute of Education, University of London. For services to Higher Education.
- Ann Needle. For services to the Soldiers', Sailors' and Airmen's Families Association.
- Dr. Cyril Nemeth, JP. For public service in London.
- Anita Newcourt, TD, Manager, Special Facilities, BAA plc, Heathrow. For services to Hospitality.
- Martin Newman. Founder and Chair, Katie's Ski Tracks. For services to Children with Special Educational Needs.
- Michael Nicholls, Chair of Governors, The Heathland School, Hounslow, London. For services to Education.
- Joy Nichols, Director and Chief Executive, Nichols Employment Agency Ltd. For services to Business and to Entrepreneurship.
- Anthony Noel, Inspector of Taxes, HM Revenue and Customs.
- Frances Beatrice Nolan, DL. For public service.
- Nancy Norton, JP, Executive Officer, Jobcentre Plus.
- Muriel Nymark, lately Administrator, Belfast Institute of Further and Higher Education. For services to Further Education and to Community Training in Northern Ireland.
- Natalya O'Prey, Executive Assistant, London Headquarters, Her Majesty's Courts Service.
- Anne Morag Oaten. For services to the Cornwall Church Action with the Unemployed and to Macmillan Cancer Relief in Truro, Cornwall.
- Miranda Oladeji, Administrative Officer, Jobcentre Plus.
- Rachael Wynne Oldham, Bailiff, Stafford County Court, Her Majesty's Courts Service.
- Dr. Rhian Elin Owen, MacMillan Consultant, Palliative Medicine, Bro Morgannwg NHS Trust. For services to Medicine.
- Toni Oxlee, Head of Curriculum-Skills for Life, Medway Adult Community and Learning Service, Kent. For services to Adult Learning.
- Kevin Brian Page, Chair, Institute of Maxillofacial Prosthetists and Technologists. For services to Healthcare.
- Dr. Margaret Anne Palmer. For services to Nature Conservation.
- Dr. Richard John Palmer. For services to Science Publishing.
- Davinder Pangli, JP, Head, Consumer Advice Unit, Trading Standards, Warwickshire County Council. For services to the community in Coventry and Warwickshire.
- Annette Louise Parrott. For services to the community in Lairg, Sutherland.
- Elizabeth Ann Parrott, Prison Service Manager, Prison Service College, Newbold Revel, HM Prison Service.
- Desmond Gerard Pastore. For services to Rugby.
- Shirley Pate. For services to Age Concern and to the community in Watlington and Chalgrove, Oxfordshire.
- Faizal Patel. For services to the community in Blackburn, Lancashire.
- Mahmoud Mohammed Patel. For services to Community Relations in Gloucester.
- Kornelia Patrickson, HIVE Information Officer. For services to the Ministry of Defence.
- Erica Susan Pearson, lately Senior Pensions Policy Manager, NHS Pensions, Department of Health.
- Aquila Peasgood, Clerk to the Corporation, Stamford College, Lincolnshire. For services to Further Education.
- Samuel Edwin Peat. For services to the Royal British Legion in Warwickshire.
- Ronald Leslie Perry. For services to Milton Keynes Hospital, Buckinghamshire.
- Colin Pettener, Road Safety Officer, Shropshire County Road Safety Team. For services to Local Government.
- Professor Robert Stephen Phillips, lately Chair, West Dunbartonshire Children's Panel. For services to Children.
- Colin Gerald Philpott. For services to Sport and to the community in Maldon, Essex.
- Eileen Dorothy Pitman, Coach and Founder, Portslade Fencing Club. For services to Sport in Sussex.
- Winifred Anne Plummer. For services to the Soldiers', Sailors' and Airmen's Families Association in Lincolnshire.
- Barbara Pointon. For services to People with Dementia.
- Herschel Post, Chair, Earthwatch, Europe. For services to the Environment.
- Edward Charles Prosser, Inventor. For services to Business and to the community in Wales.
- Winston Allan Sigismond Pusey, Supervising Usher, Truro Crown and County Court, Her Majesty's Court Service.
- Dr. Angela Jane Puzey. For services to the community in Paglesham, Essex.
- Martin Hugh Pym. For services to the community in Kent.
- Linda Diane Quinn. For services to the community in Wales.
- Ghulam Rabbani. For services to the community in Reigate, Surrey.
- John Race, lately Coxswain, Royal National Lifeboat Institution. For services to the community in Teesmouth.
- David Rains. For services to Gingerbread and to the community in Ashford, Kent.
- Eric Michael Randall, Director of Recycling. For services to Waste Management in Northern Ireland.
- Ian Leslie Eyre Rands, Vice-Chair, Glastonbury Conservation Society. For services to Conservation in Somerset.
- Dr. Philip Michael Ratcliffe, General Dental Practitioner, Wirral. For services to Dentistry.
- Phyllis Ann Rayner. For services to HM Prison Lincoln.
- Rosalind Redfern, lately Head Duty Clerk, Prime Minister's Office.
- Maureen Reilly, Community Support Officer, BIH Housing Association. For services to Social Housing and to the Chinese Community in Northern Ireland.
- Alan Thomas Lane Retallack, Manager, St. Keverne Youth Band, Cornwall. For services to Young People.
- Helen Reynolds, Head of Science, Gosford Hill School, Oxfordshire. For services to Science Education.
- Thomas Edward Reynolds. For services to the Burma Star Association in Birmingham.
- Sylvia Richards, Chair and Manager, West Wight Nursery, Isle of Wight. For services to Children.
- Miles Anthony Richardson. For services to the Citizens' Advice Bureau in Southend-on-Sea, Essex.
- Valerie Richardson, Chair, Friends of Durham Hospitals. For services to Healthcare.
- Barbara Riddell, Adviser, Sure Start and Early Years Education. For services to Education.
- Janet Ridge, Chief Executive, Bedfordshire Rural Communities Charity. For services to communities in Bedfordshire.
- Catherine Robb, lately Discipline Officer, HM Prison Cornton Vale, HM Prison Service.
- Doreen Roberts, lately Foster Carer, Somerset. For services to Children and Families.
- Kay Winefred Mary Roberts, School Bus Driver, Milton Abbot School, Tavistock, Devon. For services to Education.
- Denise Robertson, DL. For services to Broadcasting and to Charity.
- John Robertson, President, Newspaper Society. For services to the Newspaper Industry.
- Keith Robinson, Chair of Governors, Castle View Primary School and the Grange Infant School, Cheshire. For services to Education.
- Doris Robson. For services to Older People in Ealing, London.
- Judith Brenda Roe. For services to Swimming.
- John Norman Rostron, Chair of Governors, King George V Sixth Form College, Southport, Lancashire. For services to Further Education.
- Valerie Ann Saint, lately Legal Counsel, Unilever. For services to the Food Industry and to the community in Walton-on-Thames, Surrey.
- Eric Samuel, Chief Executive, Community Food Enterprise Ltd. For services to the Food Industry in London.
- Colin John Sanders, Sub-Officer, Hereford and Worcester Fire and Rescue Service. For services to the Fire Service National Benevolent Fund.
- Paul David Sanderson, Project Manager, WIRE, Wick, Littlehampton, West Sussex. For services to Young People.
- John Sankey. For services to the community in Mansfield, Nottinghamshire.
- Michael James Sargeant, Team Leader, Environment Agency. For services to Inland Waterways in Bedfordshire.
- Eunice May Saunders, Member, Herefordshire Council. For services to Local Government and to the community in Herefordshire.
- Annabel Scarfe, Director of Development, South West London Strategic Health Authority. For services to the NHS.
- Gwendoline Florence Ada Scott. For services to Gosport Victim Support Scheme and to the Citizens' Advice Bureau in Hampshire.
- Peter Scott. For services to the Railway Preservation Society in Northern Ireland.
- Glenda Frances Seager, Administrative Officer, Health and Safety Executive.
- Michael Selby. For services to the community in Mollington and Backford, Cheshire.
- Yasmin Shakur. For services to the community in Preston, Lancashire.
- Dev Rattan Sharma, director, North West Kent Racial Equality Council. For services to the community in Kent.
- Robert William David Sharp, Chair of the Board, Upminster Windmill Preservation Trust. For services to Conservation in Essex.
- Miranda Powell-Shedden, JP, DL. For services to the Administration of Justice and to the community in Milton Keynes.
- Geoffrey David Sherley, Trustee, SKIDZ Foundation. For services to Road Safety.
- Thomas Alexander Simpson, Regional Visitor Services Manager, North Region of Historic Scotland, Scottish Executive.
- Joan Beryl Singer. For services to the community in Trafford, Greater Manchester.
- Harry Skidmore, Chair, Easibind International. For services to Business in the East Midlands.
- Cheryl Sally Sklan, Youth Worker, Masorti Jewish Community, North London. For services to Young People.
- David Nigel Geoffrey Small, Chair, The Hyde Group. For services to Social Housing in Kent.
- Alan Jeffrey Smith, Engineering Manager, SELEX Integrated Systems. For services to the Defence Industry.
- George Smith. For services to the community in Llangollen, Denbighshire.
- The Reverend Canon Ian Ainsworth-Smith, Chaplain, St George's Healthcare NHS Trust, London. For services to the NHS.
- Judith Jean Smith. For services to the community in Eltham, London.
- Pamela Smith. For services to Neighbourhood Watch in Ringshall, Stowmarket, Suffolk.
- Stephen Douglas Smith. For charitable services in Rotherham and South Yorkshire.
- William Smith, Senior Janitor, Cumnock Academy. For services to Education in East Ayrshire.
- Alderman William Woolsey Smith, Councillor, Craigavon Borough Council. For services to the community in County Armagh, Northern Ireland.
- Amarjit Somal, Head, School of English for Speakers of other Languages, East Berkshire College. For services to Further Education.
- Peter Sotheran, JP. For services to Sir William Turner's Almshouses at Kirkleatham and to the community in Redcar, North Yorkshire.
- Jean Spencer, Chair, Bury Pipeline Talking Newspaper. For services to Visually Impaired People in Bury.
- Michael Gordon Spicer. For services to the community in North Tyneside.
- Lorna Spiers, Deputy Principal, Personnel Division, Department for Regional Development, Northern Ireland Executive.
- Juliette Spiller. For services to the Soldiers', Sailors' and Airmen's Families Association in London.
- Heather Stallard. For services to the community in Hemyock, Devon.
- Marguerite Standing. For services to the NHS and to Disabled People in the West Midlands.
- Father Cedric Stanley, Chaplain, Harefield Hospital, Middlesex. For services to the NHS.
- Margaret Stephenson. For services to the community in Blackhall, County Durham.
- Tim Stevens. For services to Broadcasting in Scotland and to Charity.
- Sheila Stewart. For services to Scottish Traditional Music.
- Geraldine Middleton-Stewart, Head of Registry, Surrey Police. For services to the Police.
- Robin John Stiggear, Grade C1, Ministry of Defence.
- Henry Straker. For services to Disabled People in Northumberland.
- John Stubbs, Archer. For services to Disabled Sport.
- Babulal Sudra. For services to the Gujarati community in Redbridge, London.
- Iain Sutherland. For services to Heritage in Caithness.
- Magda Sweetland, President, Sevenoaks University of the Third Age. For services to Lifelong Learning.
- Arthur Edward Swift, Volunteer Officer, Salford Lads' and Girls' Club, Salford, Greater Manchester. For services to Young People.
- Jack Swinchatt, Chair, Stretford Association Scout Fellowship. For services to Young People.
- Peter Ronald Symes. For services to Christian Aid.
- Desmond Derrick Symonds. For services to the community in Bransford, Worcestershire.
- Mary Tait, Executive Officer, Jobcentre Plus.
- Neville Teller, Writer. For services to Broadcasting and to Drama.
- Sylvie Terry, Messenger, Cabinet Office.
- David Thompson, Head Coach, Leonis Amateur Boxing Club. For services to Young People in Jersey.
- Kathleen Thompson, Grade E2, Ministry of Defence.
- Pauline Thompson, President, Penarth Branch, Royal National Lifeboat Institution. For services to the community in the Vale of Glamorgan.
- Douglas Stormonth Thomson. For services to Blind People in Gloucestershire.
- Richard Lister Thorn. For services to Disabled People in Bristol and to the community in Wrington, North Somerset.
- Shirley Elizabeth Thorne. For services to Local Government in Winchester, Hampshire.
- Peter Frank Thorogood, co-Owner, St. Mary's Historic House and Gardens, Bramber, West Sussex. For services to Conservation and the Arts.
- Robert Thorogood, general manager, District Line, London Underground. For services to Public Transport.
- Anne Denese Thorpe. For services to the community in Cheshire.
- Graham Paul Thorpe. For services to Cricket.
- Margaret Rose Christine Thrush. For services to the community in Swansea.
- Fiona Thurlbeck, Project Manager, Halifax Works. For services to Learning and Skills in West Yorkshire.
- Patricia Margaret Tiley, Volunteer Leader, Girl Guiding UK. For services to Young People.
- Graham Tinsley, Manager, Welsh National Culinary Team. For services to the Food Industry.
- John Tocock, Head of Marketing Services, National Savings and Investments, HM Treasury.
- Robin John Todd, Deputy Leader, District of Easington Council. For services to Local Government in County Durham.
- Irene Margaret Clare Tominey, lately Head of Unit, St. Philip's Residential Special School, Plains, Airdrie. For services to Special Needs Education in Scotland.
- George Anthony Tomlinson. For services to the Fishing Industry in Cornwall.
- Clements Harry Tompsett, Chair, British Carrot Growers' Association. For services to Agriculture and to the community in Cambridgeshire.
- Anthony Keith Tonge. For services to the Greater Manchester Probation Service.
- Lesley Tracey, Research Administrator, Engineering and Physical Sciences Research Council. For services to the Administration of Science.
- John Christopher Treherne, Head of Gateshead Schools' Music Service, Gateshead, Tyne and Wear. For services to Music Education.
- Richard Barrie Treleaven. For services to Ornithology in Cornwall.
- Sheila Carole Tremmellen. For services to Animal Welfare.
- Angela Mary Turner. For services to the Welfare of Prisoners.
- Elizabeth Turner. For services to the community in Martock, Somerset.
- Dr. Mark Turner. For services to the Defence Industry.
- Thelma Ann Twigg. For services to the Newcastle and North Staffordshire Play Council and to Young People in Newcastle-under-Lyme.
- Elizabeth Underhill, Assistant Officer, HM Revenue and Customs.
- Maureen Wendy Utting, Manager, Crown Court Witness Service. For services to the Administration of Justice in Kent.
- Owen Le Vallee. For services to Sport in Guernsey.
- Caroline van den Brul, lately Creativity Leader, BBC. For services to Broadcasting.
- Grace Evelyn Vanterpool, Diabetes Lead and Specialist Nurse, Slough Primary Care Trust. For services to Healthcare.
- Margaret Vasey, Policy Liaison Manager, Child Support Agency.
- Karl Vella, WorldSkills Chief Expert for Autobody Repair and managing director, Karl Vella Autobody Repair Centres Ltd. For services to Skills Training.
- Adrian Vettese, Manager, Special Programmes Section, Adam Smith College, Fife. For services to Special Needs Education.
- Suzanne Wade, Personal Assistant, School Standards Group, Department for Education and Skills.
- Anthony Wadlow. For services to the Tourist Industry.
- Robert John Wadsworth, Incident Support Unit Manager, Traffic Management, Carillion Highway Maintenance. For services to Road Safety.
- Martin Robert Wake. For services to Healthcare and to the community in Suffolk.
- Councillor Windell Oliver Walcott, Member, West Oxfordshire District Council. For services to the community in West Oxfordshire.
- Bernard Waldron, Director of Manufacturing (UK) and Site general manager, MBDA. For services to the Defence Industry.
- Terence Warburton. For services to the community in Leighton Buzzard, Bedfordshire.
- Simon Philip Warwick. For services to Nature Conservation in North Yorkshire.
- David Roger Waterworth. For services to Disabled People in the Isle of Man.
- George David Watt, lately Information Systems Audit Manager, HM Revenue and Customs.
- Clare Margaret Webb, Co-Founder and Chair, Neurofibromatosis Association. For services to Healthcare.
- Lulie Webb. For charitable services in Wiltshire.
- Dr. Jan Welch, Clinical Director, The Haven, Camberwell. For services to Violence Against Women.
- Sheila Wheeler, Foster Carer, Isle of Wight. For services to Children and Families.
- Pamela Anne White. For services to the Women's Royal Voluntary Service and Children First.
- Peter Sydney White, JP, Chair of Governors, Brunswick Park Primary School, Barnet, London. For services to Education.
- Barry Russell Whitehouse. For services to the community in Tipton, West Midlands.
- Stephen William Whittaker, Contract Services Manager, Mid-Bedfordshire Council. For services to Local Government.
- Sally Ann, The Honourable Mrs. Wigram, Trustee, NSPCC London Region FULL STOP Appeal Committee. For services to Children.
- Janet Wilcox, Acting Deputy Governor, HM Prison Wormwood Scrubs, HM Prison Service.
- Peter Wildblood. For services to the Prostate Cancer Support Group and to the Acorns Children's Hospice.
- David William Wilkins, Constable, West Mercia Constabulary. For services to the Police.
- Ian Wilkinson, Media Technician, Dundee College. For services to Further Education in Scotland.
- Kenneth Willcox. For services the community in Shilbottle, Northumberland.
- Jack Williams. For charitable services.
- John Anthony Williams, JP. For services to the community in the Cynon Valley, South Wales.
- Lee Williams, Managing Director, Universal Service Solution. For services to Business in the West Midlands.
- Sandra Williams. For services to the communities of Brynteg and Broughton, Wrexham, North Wales.
- Ysanne Williams, Senior Sustainable Development Officer, Lichfield District Council, Staffordshire. For services to Local Government.
- Susan Annie Wilmore. For services to the Royal Marines Band.
- Bryan Pierce Wilson, ERD. For services to the Soldiers', Sailors' and Airmen's Families Association in Hampshire.
- Juliet Rose Conyers Wilson. For services to the community in Fotheringhay, Northamptonshire.
- Anthony Denison Wood. For services to the community in Liskeard, Cornwall.
- Dorothy Wood, Artistic Producer, M6 Theatre Company. For services to Drama in the North West.
- Diana Louise Woodward, Constable, Cheshire Police. For services to the Police.
- Charles Worthington. For services to Hairdressing.
- Janet Wren. For services to the British Red Cross Society in Berkshire.
- Syed Aftabuz Zaman, consultant, Accident and Emergency and Associate Clinical Director, Sherwood Hospitals NHS Trust. For services to Medicine.

Diplomatic Service and Overseas List

- Dr. Sultana Feroze Al Qu'aiti. For services to disadvantaged communities in Yemen and to British relations with Yemen and Saudi Arabia.
- Leslie George Albiston. For services to British education in France.
- June Rita Olive Augustus. For services to victims of domestic violence and to the community, Bermuda.
- Daryl John Barker. For services to British education and to the local community in Ecuador.
- John Howard Baron, TD. For services to British business interests and to the community in the Slovak Republic.
- Linda Alison Barr. For services to disadvantaged children in Romania.
- Gillian Ann Belben, lately Director, British Council Kano.
- Rodney James Benjamin. For services to public health, St. Helena.
- Michael Caetano. For services to the community, Gibraltar.
- Brenda Margaret Carty. For services to the community, Anguilla.
- Peter Anthony Chamberlain, lately Second Secretary, British Embassy, Baghdad.
- Jane Olga Hearn-Cutar, Commercial Assistant, British Consulate-General, New York.
- Wing Commander Brian John Norman Essex, AFC, Royal Air Force (Retired). For services to British war veterans and to UK-Maltese relations.
- John McKenzie Gibbs. For services to the local community in Mexico and to UK-Mexican relations.
- Ann Pamela Hicks, Support Officer, Foreign and Commonwealth Office.
- Richard Adrian Hucker. For services to British business interests in Iraq.
- Christopher Hughes, First Secretary, Foreign and Commonwealth Office.
- Gordon Harold Jago. For services to the promotion of international youth football.
- Christopher John Johnson. For services to nature conservation in Jordan.
- Delton Benfield Jones. For public service, Turks and Caicos Islands.
- Howard Jones. For services to steam railways in Poland and to UK-Polish relations.
- Linda Kelly, Vice-Consul, British Consulate-General, Houston.
- John Barry Kenyon, Honorary Consul, Pattaya.
- Christopher Thomas Gill Leech. For services to British education in Spain.
- Victor Emanuel Mizzi. For services to child victims of the Chernobyl disaster in Belarus.
- The Reverend Marina Rosalind Morgan. For services to the community, Montserrat.
- Andrew Graham Nicholson, First Secretary, Foreign and Commonwealth Office.
- Mark O'Hagan, Second Secretary, Foreign and Commonwealth Office.
- Madge Quinn. For services to education and development in Uganda.
- Yasmine Radi, Third Secretary, Foreign and Commonwealth Office.
- Neil Malcolm Richards. For services to British education in Japan.
- Sandra Blair Robertson, Second Secretary, Foreign and Commonwealth Office.
- Sharon Yvonne Silverwood Robson, Vice-Consul, British Embassy, Athens.
- Mariola Russo. For services to the community, Gibraltar.
- Detective Constable Joan Daley Sewell. For services to family liaison, especially involving incidents overseas.
- Raxa Subash Sukhtankar. For services to the community, Ascension Island.
- Thai Nhi Duc (Allen). For services to British business interests in Vietnam.
- Michael George Thomas. For services to the emergency services and reconciliation in Kosovo.
- Robert John Ross Tyldesley. For services to waste management, the environment and the local community in Ukraine.
- Charles William Walker, Country Manager, British Council Jordan.
- Linda Christine Walker. For services to child victims of the Chernobyl disaster in Belarus.
- William Sidney Bradford Wharton, Third Secretary, Foreign and Commonwealth Office.
- Thomas Granville Whittaker. For services to mountaineering and to people with disabilities.
- Edwin Cleeve Wilson. For services to the community, Bermuda.
- Peter Harry Yates. For services to British education in Iran.

=== Royal Red Cross (RRC) ===
==== Associate of the Royal Red Cross (ARRC) ====
- Lieutenant Debra Marie Emmerson, Queen Alexandra's Royal Naval Nursing Service.
- Lieutenant Commander Christine Jane Robson, Queen Alexandra's Royal Naval Nursing Service.

=== Queen's Police Medal (QPM) ===
England and Wales

- David Armond, lately Commander, Metropolitan Police Service.
- Richard Brunstrom, Chief Constable, North Wales Police.
- Sarah Douglas, Constable, Cheshire Constabulary.
- Stephen James Finnigan, Acting Chief Constable, Lancashire Constabulary.
- Paul Martin Forrester, Chief Superintendent, Merseyside Police.
- Barbara Franklin, Detective Sergeant, Northumbria Police.
- Alan Given, lately Deputy Assistant Commissioner, Metropolitan Police Service.
- David Alan Gregory, Constable, Hampshire Constabulary.
- Sharon Bernadette Anne Kerr, Detective Chief Superintendent, Metropolitan Police Service.
- Robert MacKie, Chief Superintendent, Metropolitan Police Service.
- Michael John McAndrew, Superintendent, Metropolitan Police Service.
- Ronald Stanley Edwin McPherson, Deputy Assistant Commissioner, Metropolitan Police Service.
- Martin Kenneth Parker, Detective Superintendent, Surrey Police.
- Trevor William Pearce, lately Director General, National Crime Squad.
- Ian Readhead, Deputy Chief Constable, Hampshire Constabulary.
- Colin Frederick William Smith, lately Assistant Chief Constable, Hampshire Constabulary.
- Sara Joanne Thornton, Acting Chief Constable, Thames Valley Police.
- Richard Venables, lately Detective Inspector, Centrex.
- Frank Neil Whiteley, Chief Constable, Hertfordshire Constabulary.

Scotland

- Ian James Latimer, Chief Constable, Northern Constabulary.
- Patrick Lindsay (Paddy) Tomkins, Chief Constable, Lothian and Borders Police.

Northern Ireland

- Gary Mcnair, Acting Detective Inspector, Police Service of Northern Ireland.
- William Wesley Wilson, Chief Superintendent, Police Service of Northern Ireland.
- Philip Wright, Detective Chief Superintendent, Police Service of Northern Ireland.

=== Queen's Fire Services Medal (QFSM) ===
England and Wales

- Andrew Philip Barrett, Senior Divisional Officer, London Fire Brigade.
- Bernie Cahill, chief fire officer, Derbyshire Fire and Rescue Service.
- Desmond George Michael Prichard, chief fire officer, East Sussex Fire and Rescue Service.
- Christopher Paul Turnock, Deputy chief fire officer, Cheshire Fire and Rescue Service.

Scotland

- John Robert Fenton, Divisional Officer, Central Scotland Fire and Rescue Service.
- Hugh Henny, Temporary Deputy chief fire officer, Highlands and Islands Fire and Rescue Service.
- John (Jack) Hutcheon, Deputy Chief Officer, Tayside Fire and Rescue Service.

=== Queen's Volunteer Reserves Medal (QVRM) ===
- Captain Peter John Blake, TD. (527287), Royal Yeomanry, Territorial Army.
- Captain Stephen Leonard Ellis (540353), The Royal Green Jackets, Territorial Army.
- Colonel Roger Alan Hood, TD. (510215), late The Royal Logistic Corps, Territorial Army.
- Lieutenant Colonel Hugh John Robertson, TD. (529902), Royal Corps of Signals, Territorial Army.
- Major Mark Nigel George Russell (544807), Honourable Artillery Company, Territorial Army.
- 24170116 Corporal James Graham Samson, Corps of Royal Electrical and Mechanical Engineers, Territorial Army.
- Lieutenant Colonel Richard William Wilson, TD. (532500) Royal Regiment of Artillery, Territorial Army.
- Wing Commander Geoffrey Philip Smith (0688321V), Royal Air Force Reserve.

=== Colonial Police and Fire Service Medal ===
- Andrew Boyce, Detective Chief Inspector, Bermuda Police Service.
- Alan Cleave, Chief Inspector, Bermuda Police Service.
- Frank Rawlinson, Police Constable, Royal Gibraltar Police.
- Roseanda Laverne Young, Deputy Commissioner, Bermuda Police Service.

== Cook Islands ==
=== Order of the British Empire ===
==== Officer of the Order of the British Empire (OBE) ====
Civil Division

- Apolo Dean. For services to the Church and public service.

==== Member of the Order of the British Empire (MBE) ====
Civil Division

- Tupa Urirau Tupa. For services to health and the community.

==== British Empire Medal (BEM) ====
Civil Division

- June Margaret Baudinet. For services to sports, business and the community.
- Vereara Maeva-Taripo. For services to women, the Cook Islands Association for Non-Government Organisation and public service.

== Grenada ==
=== Order of the British Empire ===
==== Commander of the Order of the British Empire (CBE) ====
Civil Division

- Bishop Emeritus Sydney Charles. For community service.

==== Officer of the Order of the British Empire (OBE) ====
Civil Division

- Irwin Ollivierre. For services to education.
- Helena Ross. For services to education.

==== Member of the Order of the British Empire (MBE) ====
Civil Division

- Dr. Sekhar Tam Tam. For services to health and public service.

==== British Empire Medal ====
Civil Division

- Otterson Frederick. For services to fishing.
- Rose Hall. For community service.
- Leo St. John. For services to fishing.

== Papua New Guinea ==
=== Knight Bachelor ===
- Roger Keith Cunningham, CBE. For services to commerce and industry.
- Graeme Ian Whitchurch, OBE. For public service.

=== Order of Saint Michael and Saint George ===
==== Companion of the Order of St Michael and St George (CMG) ====
- The Honourable Malcolm Roy Smith-Kela, MBE. For services to primary industry and the environment.
- Robert Lenton Parer, MBE. For services to commerce, industry, education and the community.

=== Order of the British Empire ===
==== Knight Commander of the Order of the British Empire (KBE) ====
Civil Division

- James Michael Ah Koy, OBE. For services to business, commerce and the community.
- Joseph James Tauvasa, MBE. For services to government, commerce and manufacturing.

==== Commander of the Order of the British Empire (CBE) ====
Civil Division

- Colin Bruce Bubner, MBE. For services to transport, sport and the community.
- Bishop Austen Crapp, OFM. For services to the Church.
- Winifred Kamit. For services to law, commerce and public administration.
- Justice Mark John Sevua. For service to law, the judiciary and the community.

==== Officer of the Order of the British Empire (OBE) ====
Military Division

- Captain (Navy) Alois Ur Tom (86425), Papua New Guinea Defence Force.

Civil Division

- John Alman. For services to government and public service.
- Benedict Chan. For services to business, finance and the law.
- Toami Kulunga, QPM. For services to the Royal Papua New Guinea Constabulary.
- Leonard Louma. For services to international relations and public service.
- Colleen Marie MacCarthy. For services to commerce, industry and the community.
- Gregory John Melides. For services to commerce and the community.
- Ivan O'Hanlon. For services to business and the community.
- Rimbink Pato. For services to law and public administration.
- Nathanial Poya. For services to the Lutheran Church and to commerce.
- James Robins. For services to research and Rugby Football League.
- Richard Charles Sikani. For public service.
- Tessie Soi. For services to charity.
- David Wiltshire. For services to air transport and Air Niugini.

==== Member of the Order of the British Empire (MBE) ====
Military Division

- Colonel Joe Fabila (86827), Papua New Guinea Defence Force.
- Lieutenant Colonel Gilbert Toropo (89057), Papua New Guinea Defence Force.
- Colonel Davey Magupia Ugul (85173), Papua New Guinea Defence Force.

Civil Division

- Alun Beck. For services to eco-tourism and television.
- Helen Billie. For services to the Royal Papua New Guinea Constabulary.
- Joseph Miugle Bina. For services to local government and the community.
- Noel John Chapman. For services to commerce and the community.
- David Francis Freyne. For services to primary industry and rural development.
- Donna Harvey-Hall. For services to charity and the community.
- Jacob Hevelawa. For public service.
- The Reverend Peter Poye Kapia. For services to youth development and the community.
- Kelly Maeapi Karella. For services to the community and the correctional service.
- Leo Kavaua. For services to the community and public service.
- Francis Kikira. For services to the community and the Catholic Church.
- The Reverend David Kini. For services to the United Church and the community.
- Nape Kupe. For services to the community.
- Geok Mei (Sandra) Lau. For services to business, commerce and the community.
- Mick Nades. For services to accounting and education.
- Joe Nato. For services to the Salvation Army.
- Lohial Ignatius Nuau. For services to sports.
- Henry Saiyo Parakei. For services to public transport administration and public service.
- Camillus Arom Roy. For services to the community.
- Kiki Geno Rupa. For services to local music and entertainment.
- Schola Gimo Sengu. For services to the Royal Papua New Guinea Constabulary.
- Utika Siserta. For services to the community, law and politics.
- Paul Sakau Somare. For services to the Royal Papua New Guinea Constabulary.
- James Sinton Spence. For services to commerce and the community.
- The Reverend Dia Taeva. For services to the United Church.
- Robert Brian Wheeler. For services to accounting and training.

=== Companion of the Imperial Service Order (ISO) ===
- Mataio Rabura. For public service.
- Warren Wak Temokang. For services to provincial government administration and public service.

=== British Empire Medal (BEM) ===
Military Division

- 88816 Corporal Alex Gini, Papua New Guinea Defence Force.
- 87276 chief warrant officerJoseph Kofe Kamane, Papua New Guinea Defence Force.
- 86977 chief warrant officerHosea Kapin, Papua New Guinea Defence Force.
- 87757 chief warrant officerKapana Gumu Pala, Papua New Guinea Defence Force.
- 87603 chief warrant officerJoseph Reu, Papua New Guinea Defence Force.

Civil Division

- Genevieve Aia. For services to law and the judiciary.
- Allan Graham Angopa. For services to the community.
- Joseph Apa. For services to the community.
- Nancy Aue. For services to Air Niugini.
- Lujia Dabale. For services to education.
- Michael Dengi. For services to the Salvation Army.
- Jack Ekaroa. For services to the Police.
- The Reverend Ubabae Erinuwe Gabeho. For services to the community and New Life Church.
- Namung Galang. For services to the community.
- John Goru. For services to the community and youth development.
- Kos Has. For services to the community.
- Josephine Boge Itana. For services to business and politics.
- Jephat Kaiae Itaupe. For services to provincial government.
- John Copland Javiripa. For services to the community.
- Julienne Kageni. For services to the community.
- Sine Yaldrua Kelaga. For services to local and provincial government.
- Peter Baga Kengemar. For services to the correctional service.
- Reginald Kerahu. For services to local level government and the community.
- Theresa Leka. For services to Air Niugini.
- Ronnie Mamia. For public service.
- Sese Morea. For public service.
- Lita Mugugia. For public service.
- Bernard Gigmai Nime. For services to the community.
- Tali Aigal Pasip. For services to the community and politics.
- Iti Purivarage. For services to the community.
- Lucy Sevese. For public service.
- Job Talau. For services to the community.
- Robert Titi. For public service.
- Paul Unipite. For services to the Royal Papua New Guinea Constabulary.
- Apa Wal. For services to law and the judiciary.
- Riga Wanuck. For services to the community.
- Amuku Wareba. For services to the Royal Papua New Guinea Constabulary.
- Billy Hosea Wartovo. For services to sports.
- Gure Nari Woni. For services to the Evangelical Lutheran Church and the community.
- Gauma Yaigo. For public service.

=== Queen's Police Medal (QPM) ===
- Joab Mangae. For services to the Royal Papua New Guinea Constabulary.
- Peter Nessat. For services to the Royal Papua New Guinea Constabulary.
- Francis Nekemki Tokura. For services to the Royal Papua New Guinea Constabulary.

== Solomon Islands ==
=== Order of Saint Michael and Saint George ===
==== Companion of the Order of St Michael and St George (CMG) ====
Civil Division

- Francis Billy Hilly. For services to community development.

=== Order of British Empire ===
==== Commander of the Order of the British Empire (CBE) ====
Civil Division

- The Reverend Aaron Bea. For services to church and community development.

==== Officer of the Order of the British Empire (OBE) ====
Civil Division

- David Leslie Hayward. For services to commerce and sports development.
- John Smith Pitabelama. For services to sport, police and public service.
- Dr. Cecil Wilson Waketaku. For services to medical and health services.

==== Member of the Order of the British Empire (MBE) ====
Civil Division

- Father Benedict Garimane. For services to church and community development.
- Stephen Tonafalea. For services to politics, church and community development.
- Dudley Wate. For services to agriculture and community development.
- The Reverend George Agava Zama. For services to education and church and community development.

== Saint Lucia ==
=== Order of Saint Michael and Saint George ===
==== Companion of the Order of St Michael and St George (CMG) ====
Civil Division

- Suzie Agnes-Ida d'Auvergne. For services to the judiciary.

=== Order of the British Empire ===
==== Officer of the Order of the British Empire (OBE) ====
Civil Division

- Emma Hippolyte. For services to the government and public service.
- Velon Leo John. For services to the public and the community.

==== Member of the Order of the British Empire (MBE) ====
Civil Division

- Victor Aloysius Alexander Eudoxie. For services to banking.
- Wilbert King. For public service.
- Dr. Charles Keith Scotland. For services to the field of veterinary surgery.
- Winston Andrew Taylor. For public service.

==== British Empire Medal (BEM) ====
Civil Division

- Victor Archie Edward. For services to agriculture.
- Philson Leonard Joseph. For services to agriculture.

== Antigua and Barbuda ==
=== Queen's Police Medal (QPM) ===
- Delano Christopher. For services to the Royal Police Force of Antigua and Barbuda.
