= Elizabeth Fradd =

British nursing administrator (1949–2024)

- Born: 12 May 1949
- Died: 12 May 2024 (aged 75)
- Occupation: nurse
- Employer: National Health Service
- Organization: Royal College of Nursing
- Known for: being Deputy Chief Nursing Officer for England
- Awards: FRCN
- Honours: DBE

Dame Elizabeth Harriet Fradd, DBE, FRCN (12 May 1949 – 12 May 2024) was a British nurse leader with a particular interest in children's nursing.

== Life and career ==
Fradd qualified in adult nursing in 1970, subsequently becoming a registered nurse, before qualifying and registering in children's nursing in 1971, midwifery in 1973 and health visiting in 1981.

Between 1973 and 1983, she held a variety of registered nurse, midwife and health visitor posts; she managed children's units in Nottingham and worked as a nursing officer at the Department of Health.

In 1994, she gained an MSc in Health Care Policy and Organisation from the University of Nottingham. A year later, she became the Director of Nursing and Education at the NHS Executive West Midlands Regional Office. In 1999, she was appointed the Assistant Chief Nursing Officer (Nursing Practice) for the Department of Health.

She was Director of Nursing and Education in the West Midlands Regional Office before becoming Assistant Chief Nurse in the Department of Health in 1999. She chaired the Joint British Advisory Committee for Children's Nursing for over ten years. She chaired the Children's Nursing Committee for the English National Board and was Vice Chair of the Royal College of Nursing Children’s Nurse Managers Forum.

Fradd served at the Commission for Health Improvement as Director of Nursing and Lead Director for the Inspection and Review Programme. She held many honorary academic positions which include a Visiting Professor of Nursing at the University of Central England, Birmingham. Her career took an international direction, including an invitation to advise Aboriginal health workers in the Australian outback. She acted in an advisory capacity to China, the United States, Canada and Australia.

From April 2004, she worked as an independent adviser on health services and continued to take an interest in children's health as a Trustee for Contact a Family and as an adviser to Action for Sick Children. She was Vice President of Rainbows Children’s Hospice.

Fradd was University of Nottingham Council member from August 2009 until December 2018 and was their Vice-President from January 2012 through to the end of her tenure in December 2018.

She sat on the Prime Minister's independent commission that published the Front Line Care (Report) in 2010.

== Death ==
Fradd died on 12 May 2024, her 75th birthday.

== Awards ==
Fradd received honorary doctorates from the University of Central England, University of Wolverhampton and University of Nottingham, where she had a special professorship. She was made a Fellow of the Royal College of Nursing in 2004.

== Honours ==
Fradd was appointed Dame Commander of the Order of the British Empire (DBE) in the 2009 New Year Honours.

Fradd was picked High Sheriff of Nottinghamshire for the year 2020–21.
