= Richard Yates Henderson =

British solicitor and Army officer

Major Sir Richard Yates Henderson, KCVO, TD (born 1931) is a retired British solicitor and Army officer who served as Lord-Lieutenant of Ayrshire and Arran from 1991 to 2006.

Henderson studied at Hertford College, Oxford, before completing a law degree at the University of Glasgow. He was a commissioned officer in the Royal Scots Greys from 1950 to 1952, and subsequently served in the Territorial Army, retiring in 1969 with the rank of Major. He was a partner at Mitchells Roberton from 1958 until 1990, during some of which time he also held directorships with other businesses.

In 1970, Henderson was appointed a deputy lieutenant for Ayrshire. Between 1991 and 2006, he was Lord Lieutenant of Ayrshire and Arran. He was appointed a Knight Commander of the Royal Victorian Order in the 2006 Birthday Honours.
