= Winifred Kamit =

Papua New Guinean lawyer

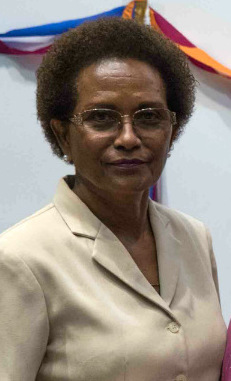
Kamit in 2017

Lady Winifred (Winnie) Taretaufi Kamit CBE is a Papua New Guinean lawyer. In the 2006 Birthday Honours she was made a Commander of the Order of the British Empire for service to law, commerce and public administration.

== Life ==
Kamit studied at the University of Papua New Guinea, graduating with a law and arts degree. In 1998 she joined Dentons in Port Moresby, becoming a partner in 1993 and managing partner in 1999.

Kamit's industry and community roles include president of the Papua New Guinea Business Council, councilor and later Trustee of the Papua New Guinea Institute of National Affairs and chair of Coalition for Change Papua New Guinea, an initiative against violence against women and children. She is also patron of the Papua New Guinea Business Coalition for Women. Her director positions have included positions with Newcrest (from 2011 to 2017), InterOil, Nautilus Minerals Niugini, South Pacific Post, Bunowen Services, Post-Courier, Allied Press, ANZ Bank, Steamships Trading Company, Lihir Gold (from 2004 to 2010) and New Britain Palm Oil. In 2017 she was appointed chair of the board of ANZ Banking (Papua New Guinea).

Kamit has also held the position of commissioner of the Public Service Commission.
