= Donald Cruickshank =

Scottish businessman (born 1942)

- Born: Donald Gordon Cruickshank; September 1942 (age 83); Elgin, Moray, Scotland
- Education: University of Aberdeen; Manchester Business School
- Occupation: Businessman
- Known for: Previous chairman of the London Stock Exchange (2000–2003); Author of UK Government review into Banking (published 2000)

Sir Donald Gordon Cruickshank (born September 1942) is a Scottish businessman, whose career has straddled public and private sector.

== Career ==
Many of the businesses that Cruickshank has worked for or chaired have been engaged in the media sector. He was managing director of Virgin Group from 1984 to 1989, overseeing its stock market listing and subsequent delisting. In the 1970s and early 1980s, Cruickshank held management positions at The Times Newspapers and Pearson Longman. From 1999 to 2004, he chaired Scottish Media Group (SMG). More recently, he was a board member of Qualcomm (2005–2015) and in 2014 became chairman of 7Digital.

While two of Cruickshank's public service roles – director general of UK telecoms regulator, Oftel, from 1993 to 1998; and chairman of millennium big task force, Action 2000 – had a media slant to them, others were in healthcare and financial services. Between 1986 and 1989, he was CEO of Wandsworth NHS Trust and from 1989 to 1993 he was CEO of NHS Scotland. In 1998 Cruickshank was commissioned by the UK Treasury to review the competitiveness of the UK banking sector, which was published in March 2000. From 2001 to 2007, he was on the board of the Financial Reporting Council.

Cruickshank’s three years as chairman of the London Stock Exchange were marked by declining a proposal to merge with German Exchange operator Deutsche Börse, appointing Clara Furse as chief executive, and listing the Exchange on its own market.

== University of Aberdeen ==
Sir Donald Cruickshank was a member of the Court of the University of Aberdeen, a governor and chairman of its governance committee He stepped down from the court and governance committee in 2011.

== Personal life ==
He was married to Elizabeth, a teacher and solicitor.

== Education ==
- University of Aberdeen, M.A., L.L.D.
- Manchester Business School, M.B.A.
