= Business in Sport and Leisure =

British umbrella organization

Business in Sport and Leisure (BISL) is a British umbrella organization comprising a number of major sport and leisure companies.
