= World Trade Centre, London =

Building in London, England

Coordinates: 51°30′4″N 0°1′10″W

The World Trade Centre was an 89-metre (292 ft), 19 storey building in the Canary Wharf area of London, England, built in 1991. The building was heavily damaged by an IRA bomb on February 9, 1996. The top four floors were demolished and after a proposal called World Trade Centre London to redevelop it as offices was cancelled following September 11, 2001, the frame was reclad and it became the Hilton Canary Wharf.

== See also ==
- South Quay DLR station
- 1996 Docklands bombing
