= Mary Bownes =

English biologist (born 1948)

- Born: 1948 (age 77–78); Devon, England
- Education: University of Sussex (DPhil)
- Awards: FRES, FRSE, FRSB
- Scientific career
- Fields: Molecular biology, Developmental biology
- Workplaces: University of Edinburgh, University of Essex
- Thesis: Determination in drosophila embryos (1973)

Mary Bownes OBE FRSE FRES FRSB is an English molecular and developmental biologist; she was Vice Principal Community Engagement and is Emerita Professor of Developmental Biology at the University of Edinburgh. She has taught genetics, molecular biology and developmental biology at all levels and was previously Head of the Institute of Cell and Molecular Biology at the University from 1998 to 2001.

== Education and research career ==
Bownes was awarded her Ph.D by the University of Sussex 1973 for her thesis on determination in drosophila embryos and continued to research oogenesis and embryogenesis in drosophila over the next years at the University of Freiburg, University of California, Irvine and University of Essex before settling at the University of Edinburgh in 1979. She was appointed Professor of Developmental Biology in 1993 and Head of the Institute of Cell and Molecular Biology in 1998.

== Positions held ==
Bownes is an External Advisor to the Royal Society Evaluation Panel, a board member of the Royal Zoological Society of Scotland, Director of the Scottish Initiative for Biotechnology Education, Director of the Edinburgh Beltane and a member of the Royal Society of Edinburgh Meeting Committee. She is a trustee of the National Museums of Scotland.

Bownes's previous roles have included being a member of the Biotechnology and Biological Sciences Research Council Strategy Board, and serving on the boards of the Scottish Association for Marine Science and Highlands and Islands Enterprise.

Bownes conducted a review of the Speculative Society, a university-associated debating club which had male-only membership for 250 years. The review recommended that the society allow women members, which it did from 2015.
