= Roger Williams (professor) =

Welsh academic, vice-chancellor of the University of Reading

Sir Roger Williams FLSW (born March 21, 1942) is a Welsh academic. He was vice-chancellor of the University of Reading from 1993 until 2002, and chair of Higher Education Funding Council for Wales from 2002 to 2008. He received a knighthood in June 2006 for his services to Higher Education. He was elected a Fellow of the Learned Society of Wales in 2011.

== Background and early life ==
Roger Williams was born in South Wales and grew up in Tafarnaubach, Tredegar near Merthyr Tydfil, where he was educated at Tredegar Grammar School. He continued his studies at Worcester College, Oxford, where he became an Honorary Fellow in 1999.
