= Community Development Alliance Scotland =

- Abbreviation: CDAS
- Formation: 2007
- Type: Charity
- Purpose: Community development
- Location: Scotland
- Website: communitydevelopmentalliancescotland.org

Community Development Alliance Scotland (CDAS) is a network of organisations that are concerned with community development in Scotland. CDAS is a member of the Scottish Government's Better Community Engagement national advisory group and submits formal responses to relevant Scottish Government policy consultations, such as the 2008 Local Healthcare Bill and the 2011 'Building a Sustainable Future' regeneration discussion paper.
