= Annabel Karmel =

British writer and TV presenter on children's and babies' nutrition

Annabel Karmel MBE
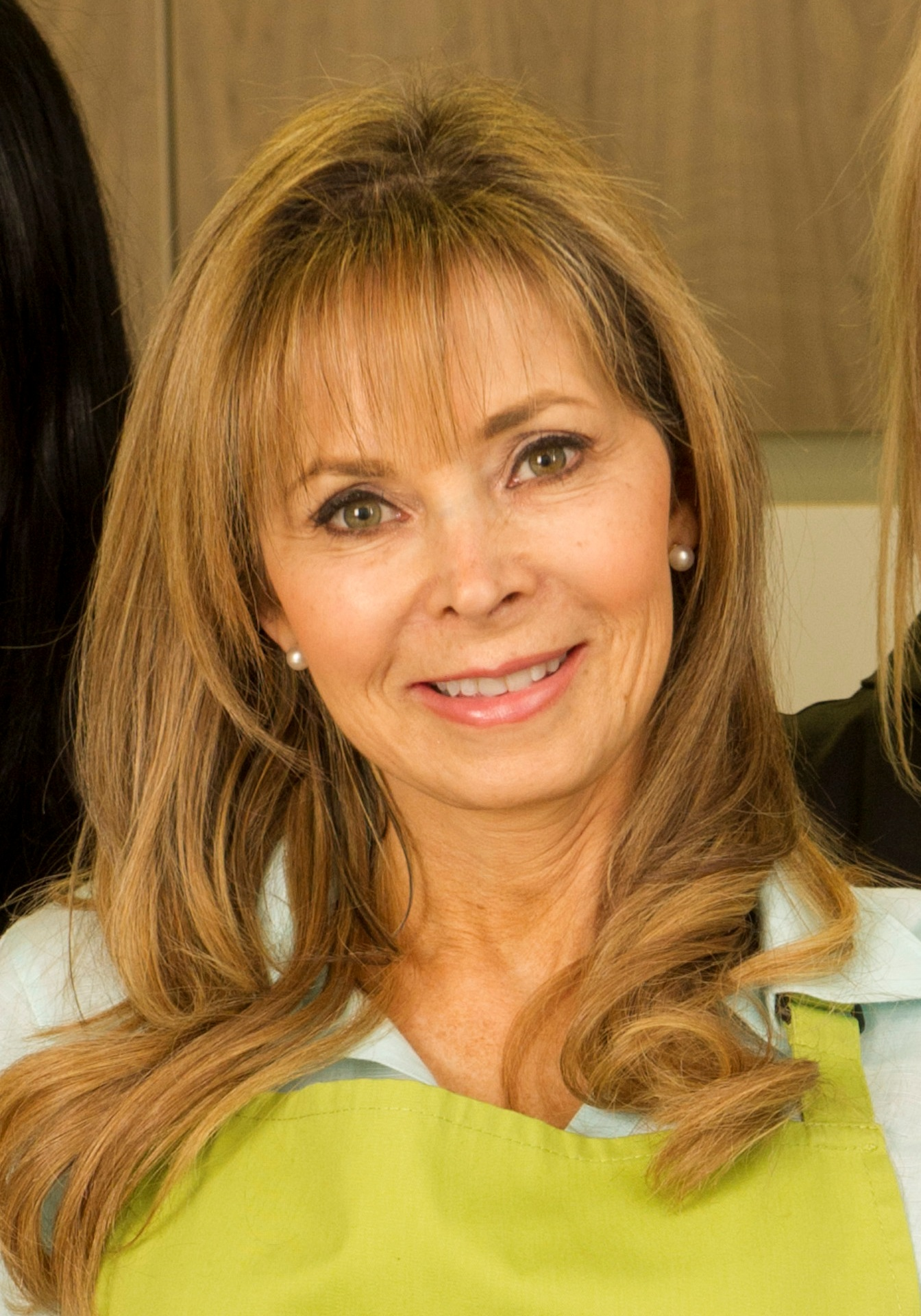
- Karmel in 2013
- Born: 10 May 1957 (age 69)
- Occupation: Chef
- Writing career
- Genre: Cookery
- Website: www.annabelkarmel.com

Annabel Jane Elizabeth Karmel MBE (born 10 May 1957) is the author of books on nutrition and cooking for babies, children and families.

== Early life ==
Annabel Karmel was born on 10 May 1957.

Prior to her career in infant nutrition she was a talented musician, under the name Annabel Etkind.

Her first book was The Complete Baby and Toddler Meal Planner, published in 1991. Karmel has since published 37 books on feeding babies, toddlers and families as well as eating in pregnancy and books on cooking with children.

== Newspapers and magazines ==
Karmel writes regularly for national newspapers and also contributes to Practical Parenting & Pregnancy, Prima Baby, BBC Good Food, Surrey, Hampshire and Tesco's Baby Club. She appears frequently on radio and television, and completed a series on the Richard & Judy Show as the Foodie Godmother, where she travelled around the country solving the problems of fussy eaters. She also filmed a 10-part series with Sky Active called Mummy That's Yummy. In 2011 Karmel aired her TV show Annabel's Kitchen, commissioned for CITV, with major sponsors being Fairy Liquid and Procter and Gamble.

Karmel's iPhone app Annabel's Essential Guide to Feeding your Baby and Toddler features 120 recipes and episodes from TV series Annabel's Kitchen. Karmel also works with NUK making a range of feeding equipment for making baby food.

== Food ==
Karmel has a popular range of food products for toddlers and babies. In 2007, Karmel launched a range of chilled ready meals for toddlers, she also has a range of ambient and organic sauces and pastas as well as teaming up with Disney to make a range of healthy snacks. Her food products are stocked in all major UK supermarkets. Karmel also has her menus in some of the largest restaurant chains; leisure parks and nurseries in the UK, serving up more than one million children's meals each year.

Karmel is a patron for the charity Julia's House, a hospice dedicated to children with life limiting conditions. She worked closely with CLIC Sargent's 'The Great Mums Get Together' campaign in 2013.

== Awards ==
Karmel was awarded an MBE in June 2006 in the Queen's Birthday Honours for her work in the field of child nutrition. In 2009, Karmel won the Lifetime Achievement Award at the Mother and Baby Awards.

== Bibliography ==
- Karmel, Annabel (20 August 2019). Real Food Kids Will Love: Over 100 Simple and Delicious Recipes for Toddlers and Up. St. Martin's Press. ISBN 9781250201386.
- Karmel, Annabel (25 May 2017). Annabel Karmel's Baby-Led Weaning Recipe Book: 120 Recipes to Let Your Baby Take the Lead. Palazzo Editions. ISBN 9781786750846.
- Karmel, Annabel (6 January 2011). My Kitchen Table - Annabel Karmel: 100 Family Meals. Ebury Press. ISBN 978-0-09-194053-9.
- Karmel, Annabel (7 May 2009). Annabel Karmel's Complete Family Meal Planner. Ebury Press. ISBN 978-0-09-193219-0.
- Karmel, Annabel (5 March 2009). Top 100 Finger Foods. Ebury Press. ISBN 978-0-09-192507-9.
- Karmel, Annabel (24 January 2008). Annabel Karmel's New Complete Baby & Toddler Meal Planner - 4th Edition. Ebury Press. ISBN 978-0-09-192485-0.
- Karmel, Annabel (23 August 2007). Fussy Eaters. Ebury Press. ISBN 978-0-09-192284-9.
- Karmel, Annabel (9 March 2006). After School Meal Planner. Ebury Press. ISBN 978-0-09-190500-2.
- Karmel, Annabel (1 September 2005). Top 100 Baby Purees. Ebury Press. ISBN 978-0-09-190499-9.
- Karmel, Annabel (7 April 2005). Annabel Karmel's Favourite Family Recipes. Ebury Press. ISBN 978-0-09-190496-8.
- Karmel, Annabel (1 October 2007). New Complete Baby and Toddler Meal Planner - Mothercare exclusive. Ebury Press. ISBN 978-0-09-192315-0.
