= Rainbow Trust Children's Charity =

- Founded: 1986
- Founder: Bernadette Cleary OBE
- Type: NGO
- Registration no.: Registered Charity No. 1070532
- Purpose: terminal illness, life-threatening illness, children, palliative care, home support, sibling support, bereavement support, hospital transport
- Origins: Surrey, England (UK)
- Region served: United Kingdom
- CEO: Zillah Bingley
- Website: rainbowtrust.org.uk

Rainbow Trust Children's Charity provides emotional and practical support to families who have a child with a life-threatening or terminal illness. Their headquarters are in Leatherhead, Surrey. They have care workers based in Swindon, Essex, Southampton, Cumbria, Surrey, Manchester, Durham, and London.

The charity was founded in 1986 by Bernadette Cleary OBE when she helped a neighbour with palliative care for her child.

== Activities ==
The charity helps families by providing non-medical services, such as assistance with household chores, sibling supervision, and transportation to and from medical appointments, aiming to maintain normal family life. It also offers bereavement support.
