= Ronald Hobson =

British businessman (1921 – 2017)

Sir Ronald Frank Hobson, KCVO (4 January 1921 – 22 April 2017) was a British entrepreneur, business-owner and philanthropist.

Hobson was born on 4 January 1921 in Edmonton, London, to a poor family. He served in the Army during the Second World War and, after being demobilised, noticed the potential for bombed-out plots of land in central London to be used as car parks.

In October 1948, he and Donald Gosling (then a trainee surveyor at Westminster City Council) secured planning permission to convert a site in Holborn into a car park. They each invested £100 and became joint chairmen of Central Car Parks, charging customers 1s 6d a day. At the time, car traffic was low in London, but car-ownership expanded in the post-war period alongside their business; by the late 1950s, they owned more than ten car parks. As The Independent summarised in 1998: "Whether the two knew that the motor-car would become of the cylinders in society's engine or property prices would go sky high is not clear. What is not difficult to say is that the duo's remarkable rise places them among of the best British business-people of their generation." In 1958, they purchased National Car Parks (NCP) and it became their focus. In 1984, they also acquired Green Flag, but the 1980s also witnessed growing competition from Europarks, which culminated in a 1993 court case in which an NCP employee was charged with conspiracy to defraud after allegedly using a security firm to spy on Europarks; the employee was acquitted, and NCP eventually acquired the company.

In 1998, Hobson and Gosling sold NCP (which had over 650 car parks by that time) to Cendant for £801 million; they had owned a 72.5% share of the business. The pair were philanthropists, donating £25 million towards the restoration of HMS Victory. They paid for Queen Elizabeth the Queen Mother's birthday celebrations in 2000, and Hobson had been among a group of businessmen who financially supported Harold Wilson as opposition leader in the 1970s. He turned down a knighthood in the "Lavender List" in 1976, but accepted appointment as a Knight Commander of the Royal Victorian Order thirty years later.

Hobson died on 22 April 2017.
