= Contact a Family =

UK-based registered charity

Contact (registered as Contact a Family) is a UK-based registered charity for families with disabled children offering support, advice and information regardless of the child's medical condition or situation. As well as supporting families the charity supports those who assist the families, including medical and educational professionals, local government workers and health workers. The charity also campaigns on behalf of disabled children's families in the UK.

Formed in 1979 as a small local project in the London Borough of Lambeth the charity now has a presence in each of the four UK countries and employs over a hundred staff. It claims to directly help hundreds of thousands of families each year and is one of the main charities in the UK for carers and disabled people's families.

The charity was a founding member of the Every Disabled Child Matters campaign and is chair of the Disabled Children's Partnership.
