= List of knights and dames commander of the Royal Victorian Order appointed by Elizabeth II (2003–2022) =

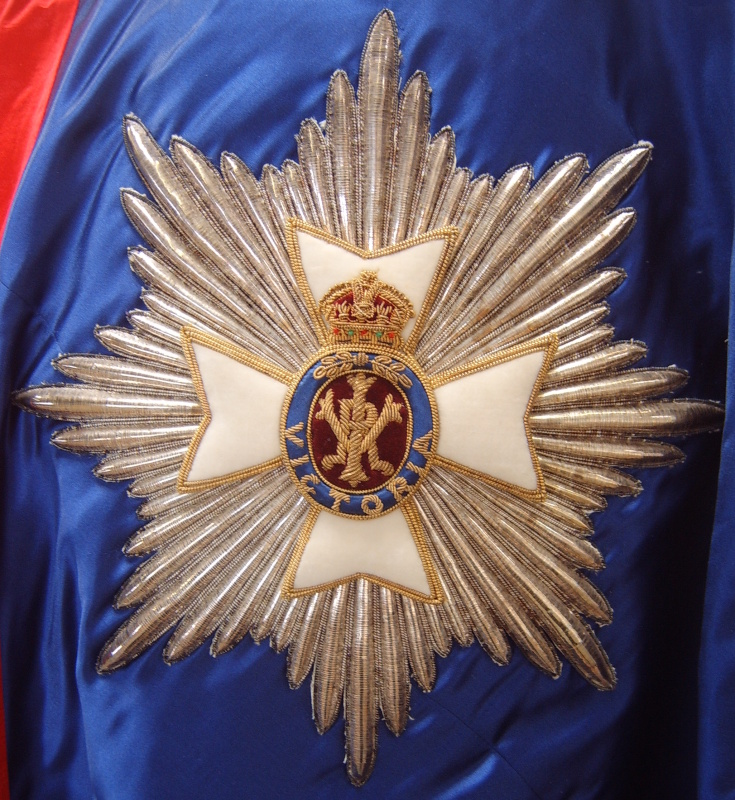
The star of a Knight or Dame Grand Cross of the Royal Victorian Order

The Royal Victorian Order is an order of knighthood awarded by the sovereign of the United Kingdom and several Commonwealth realms. It is granted personally by the monarch and recognises personal service to the monarchy, the Royal Household, royal family members, and the organisation of important royal events. The order was officially created and instituted on 23 April 1896 by letters patent under the Great Seal of the Realm by Queen Victoria. It was instituted with five grades, the two highest of which were Knight Grand Cross (GCVO) and Knight Commander (KCVO), which conferred the status of knighthood on holders (apart from foreigners, who typically received honorary awards not entitling them to the style of a knight). Women were not admitted until Edward VIII altered the statutes of the order in 1936; those receiving the highest two awards were styled dames and those grades, when conferred on women, are Dame Grand Cross (GCVO) and Dame Commander (DCVO).

No limit was placed on the number of appointments which could be made. Queen Elizabeth II appointed 104 knights and dames commander from the end of her Golden Jubilee year (2002) to her death in 2022.

== Knights and dames commander appointed by Elizabeth II (2002–2022) ==
The list below is ordered by date of appointment. Full names, ranks and titles are given where applicable, as correct at the time of appointment to the order. Branch of service or regiment details are given in parentheses to distinguish them from offices. The offices listed are those given in the official notice, printed in the London Gazette. Where applicable, the occasion is given that was listed either with the notices or in published material elsewhere, in which case that material is cited. The 'list' column refers to the biennial Honours List in which the appointment was made; B is for the Queen's Birthday Honours List, celebrating the Queen's Official Birthday in early June, and N is for the New Year's Honours List, normally released in the last days of the calendar year.

Name	Date	Notes	List	Reference
Dr Nigel Ralph Southward	12 February 2003	On retirement as Apothecary to the Queen and to the Royal Households		
Prince Andrew, Duke of York	2 June 2003	On the fiftieth anniversary of the Queen's coronation; appointment annulled 2025		
Prince Edward, Earl of Wessex	2 June 2003	On the fiftieth anniversary of the Queen's coronation		
Timothy Gerald Martin Brooks	14 June 2003	Formerly Lord Lieutenant of Leicestershire	B	
Brigadier Miles Garth Hunt-Davis, CVO, CBE	14 June 2003	Private Secretary to The Duke of Edinburgh	B	
Dr Richard Paul Hepworth Thompson	14 June 2003	Head of the Queen's Medical Household and Physician to The Queen	B	
Lieutenant-General Charles Redmond Watt, CBE	23 October 2003	On relinquishing the appointment of Major General commanding the Household Division		
Philip Lloyd Thomas, CMG	1 December 2003	British Diplomat		
John Hessell Tiltman, LVO	16 December 2003	On retirement as Director of Property Services, Royal Household		
Sir Frederick Donald Gosling	31 December 2003	For services to The Duke of Edinburgh's Award and the Outward Bound Trust (UK)	N	
Vice-Admiral David Anthony James Blackburn, CB, LVO	12 June 2004	Master of the Household	B	
Anne Griffiths, CVO	11 June 2005	Librarian and Archivist to The Duke of Edinburgh	B	
Jean Alys Barker, Baroness Trumpington	11 June 2005	Extra Baroness in Waiting to The Queen	B	
Sir Michael William Bunbury, Bt, DL	11 June 2005	Chairman, Council of the Duchy of Lancaster	B	
Simon Alexander Bowes Lyon	11 June 2005	Lord-Lieutenant of Hertfordshire	B	
Jonathan Sansbury Bailey	20 October 2005	Bishop of Derby, on retirement as Clerk of the Closet and Head of the Queen's College of Chaplains		
Thomas Vincent Fean	26 November 2005			
James Harkness, CB, OBE	7 December 2005	On relinquishment of his appointment as Dean of the Chapel Royal, Scotland		
Colonel James Stirling of Garden, CBE, TD	31 December 2005	Lord-Lieutenant of Stirling and Falkirk	N	
Dr Arthur Wesley Carr	8 February 2006	On retirement as Dean of Westminster		
Dr John Henry Moses	14 June 2006	On retirement as Dean of St Paul's Cathedral		
Claude Dunbar Hankes-Drielsma	17 June 2006	Formerly Trustee and Adviser, St. George's House, Windsor Castle	B	
Major Richard Yates Henderson	17 June 2006	Lord-Lieutenant of Ayrshire and Arran	B	
Ronald Hobson	17 June 2006	For services to charity	B	
Sir Regan Blair Reaney,	17 June 2019	Lieutenant Canadian Armed Forces	B	
Fiona Douglas Henderson, CVO	21 July 2006	Lady in Waiting to the Queen		
Philip Alan Reid	30 December 2006	Keeper of the Privy Purse	N	
Alan William Waterworth	30 December 2006	Formerly Lord-Lieutenant of Merseyside	N	
Captain Roderick William Kenneth Stirling of Fairburn	15 March 2007	Lord-Lieutenant of Ross and Cromarty		
David George Philip Cholmondeley, 7th Marquess of Cholmondeley	16 June 2007	Lord Great Chamberlain	B	
Major-General Sebastian John Lechmere Roberts, OBE	18 July 2007	On relinquishing the appointment of Major General Commanding the Household Division		
Nicholas Antony Sturridge, CVO	19 July 2007	On retirement as Surgeon Dentist to the Queen		
Air Chief Marshal Sir Richard Edward Johns, GCB, CBE, LVO	17 December 2007	On relinquishing the appointment of Constable and Governor of Windsor Castle		
Captain Norman Lloyd-Edwards, RD, RNR	29 December 2007	Lord-Lieutenant of South Glamorgan	N	
James Napier Tidmarsh, MBE	29 December 2007	Formerly Lord-Lieutenant of the County and City of Bristol	N	
Philip Lavallin Wroughton	29 December 2007	Lord-Lieutenant of Berkshire	N	
Julia Charity Cleverdon, CVO, CBE	14 June 2008	Formerly Chief Executive, Business in the Community	B	
Hugo Laurence Joseph Brunner, JP	14 June 2008	Lord-Lieutenant of Oxfordshire	B	
Charles Michael Henderson, 3rd Baron Faringdon	14 June 2008	Lord in Waiting to The Queen	B	
Commodore Robert Cameron Hastie, CBE, RD, JP	14 June 2008	Formerly Lord-Lieutenant of West Glamorgan	B	
Peregrine Andrew Morny Cavendish, 12th Duke of Devonshire, CBE	31 December 2008	Her Majesty's Representative at Ascot	N	
Rear Admiral Jeremy Michael de Halpert, CB	31 December 2008	Deputy Master, Trinity House	N	
Raymond Arthur Clanaboy O'Neill, 4th Baron O'Neill, TD	31 December 2008	Formerly Lord-Lieutenant of County Antrim	N	
Sir John Charles Buchanan Riddell, Bt, CVO	31 December 2008	Lord-Lieutenant of Northumberland	N	
Florence Mary Fagan, JP	13 June 2009	Lord-Lieutenant of Hampshire	B	
John Knollys Bather	13 June 2009	Formerly Lord-Lieutenant of Derbyshire	B	
Dr Richard John Carew Chartres	13 June 2009	Bishop of London and Dean of Her Majesty's Chapels Royal	B	
Dr Henry William George Elwes, JP	13 June 2009	Lord-Lieutenant of Gloucestershire	B	
William Joseph Hall, JP	13 June 2009	Lord-Lieutenant of County Down	B	
Samuel George Armstrong Vestey, 3rd Baron Vestey	13 June 2009	Master of the Horse	B	
David John Conner	31 December 2009	Dean of Windsor	N	
William Arthur Bromley-Davenport	31 December 2009	Lord-Lieutenant of Cheshire	N	
Angus Durie Miller Farquharson, OBE	31 December 2009	Lord-Lieutenant of Aberdeenshire	N	
Robin Denys Gill, CVO	31 December 2009	Chairman, The Royal Anniversary Trust	N	
Peter Llewellyn Gwynn-Jones, CVO	31 December 2009	Garter Principal King of Arms	N	
Susan Richenda Elton, Lady Elton, CVO	12 June 2010	Lady in Waiting to The Queen	B	
Diana Marion Maxwell, Lady Farnham, CVO	12 June 2010	Lady in Waiting to The Queen	B	
Lady Mary Christina Holborow	12 June 2010	Lord-Lieutenant of Cornwall	B	
James Appleton Hawley, TD	12 June 2010	Lord-Lieutenant of Staffordshire	B	
Roger Henry Vickers	12 June 2010	Serjeant Surgeon, Royal Household	B	
Samuel Charles Whitbread	12 June 2010	Lord-Lieutenant of Bedfordshire	B	
Sir Andrew George Buchanan, Bt	31 December 2010	Lord-Lieutenant of Nottinghamshire	N	
James Anthony Cropper	31 December 2010	Lord-Lieutenant of Cumbria	N	
Charles Geoffrey Nicholas Kay-Shuttleworth, 5th Baron Shuttleworth	31 December 2010	Chairman of the Council, Duchy of Lancaster and Lord-Lieutenant of Lancashire	N	
Christopher Geidt, CVO, OBE	11 June 2011	Private Secretary to the Queen	B	
Sir Paul Douglas Nicholson	11 June 2011	Lord-Lieutenant of County Durham	B	
John Hamilton Scott	11 June 2011	Lord-Lieutenant of Shetland	B	
Air Vice-Marshal David Allan Walker, OBE, MVO	11 June 2011	Master of the Household	B	
Vice-Admiral Timothy James Hamilton Laurence, CB, MVO, ADC	14 June 2011			
Major-General William George Cubitt, CBE	29 June 2011	On relinquishing the appointment of Major General commanding the Household Division		
Sarah Jane Frances Goad	31 December 2011	Lord-Lieutenant of Surrey	N	
Henry George Victor John Crichton, 6th Earl Erne	31 December 2011	Lord-Lieutenant of County Fermanagh	N	
Walter Robert Alexander Ross, CVO	31 December 2011	Secretary and Keeper of the Records, Duchy of Cornwall	N	
Lieutenant-Colonel Andrew Charles Ford	16 June 2012	Comptroller, Lord Chamberlain's Office	B	
Dr Donal Arthur John Keegan, OBE	16 June 2012	Lord-Lieutenant of Londonderry	B	
Michael Vernon Lockett, CVO	13 September 2012	Chief Executive, Thames Diamond Jubilee Foundation. On the occasion of the Queen's Diamond Jubilee		
Robert Michael James Gascoyne-Cecil, 7th Marquess of Salisbury, DL	13 September 2012	Chairman, Thames Diamond Jubilee Foundation. On the occasion of the Queen's Diamond Jubilee		
John Damian Spurling, OBE	13 September 2012	For services to charity, on the occasion of the Queen's Diamond Jubilee		
Charles James Dugdale, 2nd Baron Crathorne	29 December 2012	Lord-Lieutenant of North Yorkshire	N	
Martin Dunne	29 December 2012	Lord-Lieutenant of Warwickshire	N	
Captain John David Bingham Younger, LVO	29 December 2012	Lord-Lieutenant of Tweeddale	N	
Nigel Simeon McCulloch	20 February 2013	On retirement as Lord High Almoner		
Eric Dancer, CBE	15 June 2013	Lord-Lieutenant of Devon	B	
Major-General George Pemberton Ross Norton, CBE	25 June 2013	On relinquishing the appointment of Major General commanding the Household Division		
John Ballantyne Cairns	4 July 2013	On retirement as Dean of the Chapel Royal in Scotland		
Hon. Priscilla Jane Stephanie Roberts, Lady Roberts, CVO	21 July 2013	On retirement as Librarian and Curator of the Print Room, Windsor Castle		
Paul Robert Virgo Clarke, CVO	23 July 2013	On retirement as Clerk of the Council of the Duchy of Lancaster		
Elizabeth Periam Gass, Lady Gass	31 December 2013	Lord-Lieutenant of Somerset	N	
Hon. Annabel Alice Hoyer Whitehead, CVO	31 December 2013	Lady in Waiting to the Queen	N	
Algernon Eustace Hugh Heber-Percy	31 December 2013	Lord-Lieutenant of Shropshire	N	
Marcus Edward Setchell, CVO	31 December 2013	Surgeon-Gynaecologist, Royal Household	N	
Lady Juliet Margaret Townsend, LVO	14 June 2014	Lord-Lieutenant of Northamptonshire	B	
Nigel Sherlock, OBE, JP	14 June 2014	Lord-Lieutenant of Tyne and Wear	B	
Julian Beresford King, CMG, CVO	24 June 2014			
Gilleasbuig Iain MacMillan, CVO	3 July 2014	On retirement as Chaplain to the Queen in Scotland and Dean of the Order of the Thistle		
Professor John Cunningham, CVO	8 July 2014	On retirement as Head of the Medical Household and Physician to the Queen		
Air Marshal Ian David MacFadyen, CB, OBE	20 July 2014	On relinquishment of the appointment of Constable and Governor, Windsor Castle		
Dr Christopher John Hill	12 November 2014	On relinquishing the role of Clerk of the Closet and Head of the Queen's College of Chaplains		
Nicholas James Alexander, 7th Earl of Caledon	31 December 2014	Lord-Lieutenant of County Armagh	N	
Sir David Geoffrey Manning, GCMG, CVO	31 December 2014	Adviser to The Duke and Duchess of Cambridge and Prince Henry of Wales	N	
Timothy John Edward Tollemache, 5th Baron Tollemache	31 December 2014	Formerly Lord-Lieutenant of Suffolk	N	
Prince Henry of Wales	4 June 2015			
Simon Hugh Patrick Boyle	13 June 2015	Lord-Lieutenant of Gwent	B	
Archibald Hugh Duberly, CBE	13 June 2015	Lord-Lieutenant of Cambridgeshire	B	
Sir Simon Gerard McDonald, KCMG	23 June 2015			
Major-General Edward Alexander Smyth-Osbourne, CBE	11 June 2016	On relinquishment of the appointment of Major General commanding Household Division		
John Patrick Lionel Petre, 18th Baron Petre	11 June 2016	Lord-Lieutenant of Essex	B	
Martina Jane Milburn, CBE	31 December 2016	Chief Executive Officer of The Prince's Trust Group	N	
Dame Lorna Elizabeth Fox Muirhead, DBE	31 December 2016	Lord-Lieutenant of Merseyside	N	
Dr David Kim Hempleman-Adams, LVO, OBE	31 December 2016	For services to The Duke of Edinburgh's Award Scheme	N	
Michael John Stevens, CVO	31 December 2016	Deputy Keeper of the Privy Purse and Deputy Treasurer to the Queen	N	
Jennifer Ann Gretton, Baroness Gretton	17 June 2017	Lord-Lieutenant of Leicestershire	B	
Dr Ingrid Mary Roscoe	17 June 2017	Lord-Lieutenant of West Yorkshire	B	
Dr Laurence Howard, OBE, JP	17 June 2017	Lord-Lieutenant of Rutland	B	
Mark Henry Hudson	17 June 2017	Chairman, Duchy of Lancaster Council	B	
Rachel Anne Wells, CVO	4 July 2017	Assistant Secretary of the Central Chancery of the Orders of Knighthood		
Jonathan Mark Marsden	19 December 2017	Director of the Royal Collection and Surveyor of The Queen's Works of Art		
Denis Fitzgerald Desmond, CBE	30 December 2017	Lord-Lieutenant of County Londonderry	N	
Marcus James O'Lone, CVO	30 December 2017	Land agent, Sandringham Estate	N	
Mary Carew Pole, Lady Carew Pole, CVO	30 December 2017	Lady in waiting to the Princess Royal	N	
Kathrin Elizabeth Thomas, CVO, JP	30 December 2017	Lord-Lieutenant of Mid-Glamorgan	N	
Major-General Martin White, CB, CBE	9 June 2018	Lord-Lieutenant of the Isle of Wight	B	
Brigadier Melville Stewart Jameson, CBE	9 June 2018	Lord-Lieutenant of Perth and Kinross	B	
Timothy Mark Hitchens, CMG, LVO	9 June 2018	Formerly Chief Executive, Commonwealth Summit Unit, Foreign and Commonwealth Office	B	
Susan Louise Wigley, CVO	29 December 2018	Lady in Waiting to The Duchess of Gloucester	N	
The Honourable Elizabeth Susan Cunliffe-Lister	29 December 2018	Lord-Lieutenant of the East Riding of Yorkshire	N	
Richard Wilson Jewson, JP	29 December 2018	Lord-Lieutenant of Norfolk	N	
Mark Thomas Bridges, 3rd Baron Bridges, CVO	29 December 2018	Personal Solicitor to The Queen	N	
The Very Rev Professor Iain Torrance TD	2 July 2019	On the relinquishment of his appointment as Dean of the Chapels Royal in Scotland and Dean of the Order of the Thistle		
Sir Henry Aubrey-Fletcher, 8th Baronet	8 June 2019	Lord-Lieutenant of Buckinghamshire	B	
The Very Rev Dr John Hall	30 October 2019	On the relinquishment of his appointment as Dean of Westminster		
Major General Benjamin John Bathurst	7 November 2019	On the relinquishment of his appointment as Major General Commanding the Household Division		
Warren James Smith, JP	27 December 2019	Lord Lieutenant of Greater Manchester	N	
Edward Young, CVO	27 December 2019	Private Secretary to The Queen	N	
Captain Nicholas Peter Wright, CVO RN	31 July 2020	On relinquishment of appointment as Private Secretary to the Princess Royal (to be dated 11 Dec 2018)		
Vice Admiral Tony Johnstone-Burt	10 October 2020	Master of the Household	B	
Jonathan Roger Weatherby	10 October 2020	lately Her Majesty′s Representative at Ascot	B	
Peter John Field, JP	30 December 2020	Lord-Lieutenant of East Sussex	N	
Professor Huw Jeremy Wyndham Thomas	30 December 2020	Head of the Medical Household and Physician to the Queen	N	
Timothy Edwin Paul Stevenson, OBE	12 June 2021	Lord-Lieutenant of Oxfordshire	B	
Graham Kirkham, Baron Kirkham	12 June 2021	Chairman of the Trustees, Duke of Edinburgh's Award	B	
Thomas Woodcock	12 June 2021	Garter King of Arms	B	
