= 2012 Diamond Jubilee Honours =

British government recognitions

The list of Diamond Jubilee Honours 2012 was released on 13 September 2012 and made appointments and promotions within the Royal Victorian Order (and awards of the Royal Victorian Medal) to recognise contributions to the celebration of the Diamond Jubilee of Elizabeth II in 2012. The Royal Victorian Order is a dynastic order of knighthood recognising distinguished personal service to the Sovereign, and remains in the personal gift of the monarch.

== Royal Victorian Order ==
=== Knights Grand Cross of the Royal Victorian Order (GCVO) ===
- Sir Philip Alan Reid KCVO, Keeper of the Privy Purse and Treasurer to the Queen

=== Knights Commander of the Royal Victorian Order (KCVO) ===
- Michael Vernon Lockett CVO, Chief Executive of the Thames Diamond Jubilee Foundation
- Robert Michael James Gascoyne-Cecil, 7th Marquess of Salisbury, PC DL, Chairman of the Thames Diamond Jubilee Foundation
- John Damian Spurling OBE, for services to charity

=== Commanders of the Royal Victorian Order (CVO) ===
- Frances Ann MacLeod, Head of the Diamond Jubilee Unit in the Department of Culture, Media and Sport
- Lieutenant Colonel Anthony Charles Richards LVO, Deputy Master of the Royal Household and Equerry to the Queen
- Simon Howe Brooks-Ward LVO OBE TD, Chief Executive of the Diamond Jubilee Pageant and Producer of the Royal Windsor Horse Show
- Robert Gerrard Williams LVO, Producer of the Diamond Jubilee Concert

=== Lieutenants of the Royal Victorian Order (LVO) ===
- Paul Robert Edgar Double, Remembrancer in the City of London
- Adrian Anthony Joseph Evans, Pageant Master of the Thames Diamond Jubilee Pageant
- Mary Angela Kelly MVO, Personal Assistant and Senior Dresser to the Queen
- Douglas Robert King, Assistant Private Secretary to the Queen
- Dr Jill Nicola Nicholls, Chairman of the Trustees of the Woodland Trust, for Jubilee Woods
- Timothy Miles Owen MVO, Chairman of the Licensing, Operating, Safety and Planning Group at Westminster City Council
- Bruno Mark Peek OBE MVO, Pageant Master of the Diamond Jubilee Beacons
- Terence Alan Pendry MVO BEM, Stud Groom and Manager of the Royal Mews at Windsor Castle
- Colette Benedicta Geraldine Saunders, Assistant Press Secretary to the Queen
- Philip Benedict Weston, BBC Executive Director of the Diamond Jubilee Weekend
- Paul Kevin Whybrew MVO RVM, the Queen's Page

=== Members of the Royal Victorian Order (MVO) ===
- Sonia Bonici, Senior Correspondence Officer in the Royal Household's Private Secretary's Office
- John Creighton Bridcut, maker of the film A Jubilee Tribute to the Queen by the Prince of Wales
- David Phillimore Clifford, Company Secretary and Treasurer of the Thames Diamond Jubilee Foundation
- Captain Jules Cope, Captain of the Motor Yacht Leander
- Captain Ross Geoffrey Ferris OBE, Royal Fleet Auxiliary, Master of the Royal Fleet Auxiliary Fort Rosalie
- Alexander Garty, Transport Manager in the Royal Mews
- Warrant Officer Class 1 William Daran Gillduff Mott OBE, Garrison Sergeant Major for the London District
- Chief Superintendent Julia Pendry, Metropolitan Police
- Commander David George Phillips, Royal Navy, Chief Harbour Master at the Port of London Authority
- Sergeant Jonathan Lee Reeves, Metropolitan Police
- Alexander John Scully, State Invitations Secretary at the Lord Chamberlain's Office
- Peter John Stewart, Big Jubilee Lunch (Campaigns Director at the Eden Project)
- Mark Walenty Wasilewski, Park Manager at the Royal Parks of St James's Park and Green Park
- Rita Carnelia Frances Broe, Big Jubilee Lunch
- Francis Damian Byrne, Project Manager of the Royal Row Barge Gloriana

== Royal Victorian Medal (RVM) (Silver) ==
- Annie Meldrum, for personal services
- Brian Todhunter, restoration of Her Majesty's Yacht Britannia's Royal Barge and Escort Boats

== See also ==
- 2012 Birthday Honours, which includes Diamond Jubilee Honours in New Zealand
