= John Spurling =

John Spurling may refer to:

- John Spurling (businessman)
- John Spurling (author)
