= Equerry =

Royal attendant

An equerry (/ɪˈkwɛri, ˈɛkwəri/; from French écurie 'stable', and related to écuyer 'squire') is an officer of honour. Historically, it was a senior attendant with responsibilities for the horses of a person of rank. In contemporary use, it is a personal attendant, usually upon a sovereign, a member of a royal family, or a national representative. The role is equivalent to an aide-de-camp, but the term is prevalent only among some members of the Commonwealth of Nations.

== Australia ==
Australian equerries are commissioned officers in the Australian Defence Force, appointed on an ad hoc basis to the King of Australia, Governor General, state governors or to visiting foreign heads of state.

== Canada ==
Canadian equerries are drawn from the commissioned officers of the Canadian Armed Forces, and are most frequently appointed to serve visiting members of the Canadian Royal Family. The equerry appointed for the King of Canada is a senior officer, typically a major or a lieutenant-commander, while the equerry appointed for a child of the monarch is a junior officer, typically a captain or naval lieutenant.

== New Zealand ==
New Zealand equerries are appointed to serve the monarch of New Zealand only for the duration of a royal visit to the country, and are always drawn from the officers of the New Zealand Defence Force, typically captains, flight lieutenants, and navy lieutenants.

Flight Lieutenant John Hamilton was equerry to Queen Elizabeth II when she and the Duke of Edinburgh visited New Zealand in 1981. Squadron Leader Leanne Woon of the Operational Support Squadron, part of the Royal New Zealand Air Force, was the equerry to the Queen during the most recent royal visit in 2002. She was the only woman to serve as an equerry to the monarch anywhere in the Commonwealth until the appointment of Captain Katherine Anderson Royal Artillery as the British Equerry to King Charles III in 2024. Captain Sam Stevenson of the New Zealand Army served as equerry to the Duke of Cambridge during his 2005 visit to New Zealand. Squadron Leader Marcel 'Shagga' Scott of the Royal New Zealand Air Force served as equerry to HRH Prince Charles in November 2012. Squadron Leader Tim Costley of the Royal New Zealand Air Force served as equerry to the Duke of Cambridge during the 2014 Royal visit to New Zealand by the Duke and Duchess of Cambridge and Prince George.

== United Kingdom ==
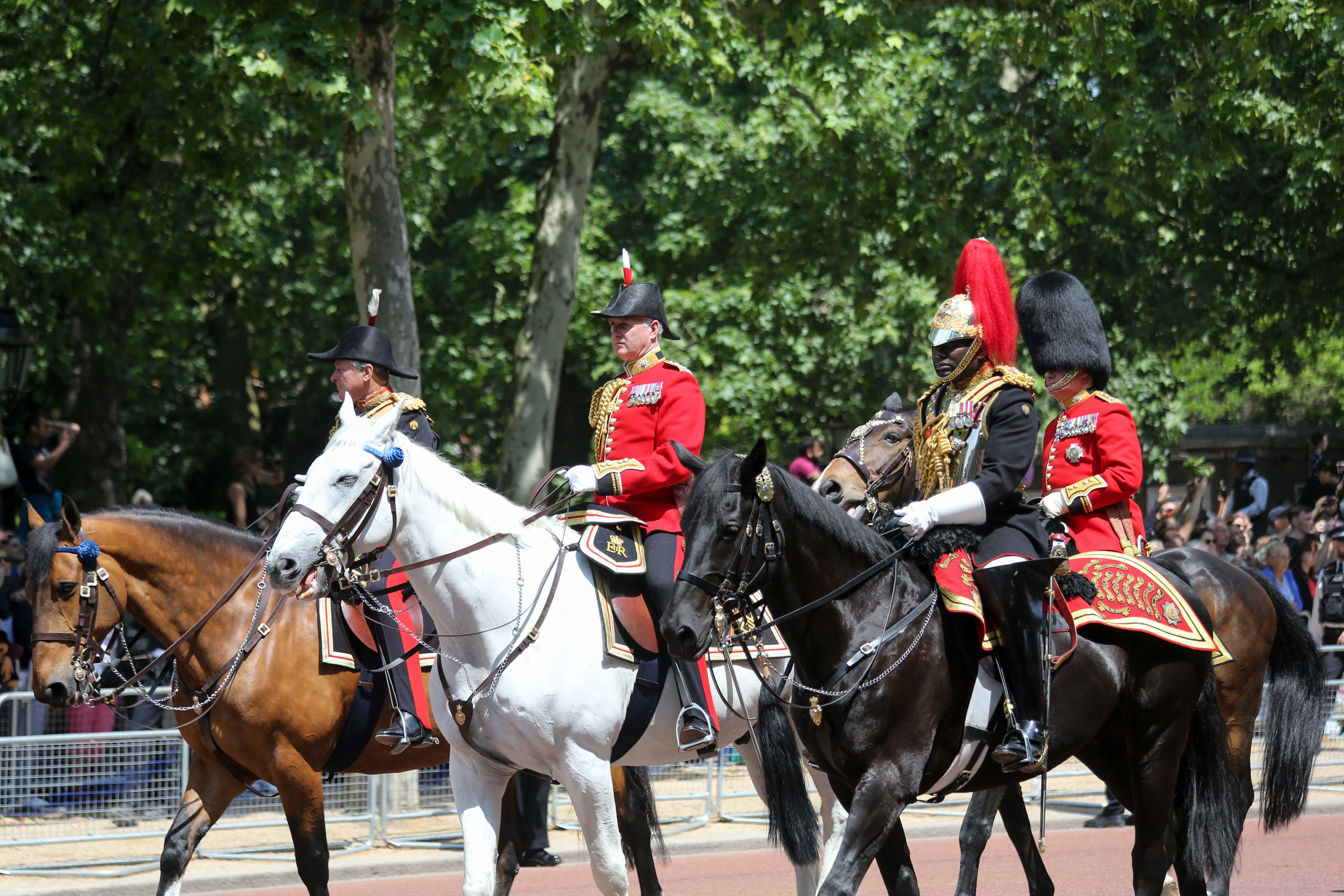
Three mounted equerries in waiting at the Queen's Birthday Parade in 2018: Colonel Toby Browne (the Crown Equerry), Lieutenant Colonel Michael Vernon (an extra equerry), Major Nana Twumasi-Ankrah (Equerry in waiting).

In the UK equerries are appointed by working members of the royal family and are drawn from junior officers of the British Armed Forces (normally captains or majors). The role involves being in regular close attendance both within the royal residence and outside on public engagements.

The Royal Household also includes a number of "extra equerries" – honorary appointees drawn from among the current and retired senior officers of the Royal Household. They are comparatively rarely required for duty, but their attendance can be called upon if needed.

The Crown Equerry is in charge of the Royal Mews Department and holds a distinct office.

Equerries, temporary equerries and extra equerries are entitled to wear aiguillettes as part of their uniform, and to wear the appropriate royal cypher below their badges of rank on the shoulder board (or equivalent). Army officers serving as equerries or extra equerries may wear a distinctive cocked hat (with red and white upright feathers) when on duty in full dress uniform.

=== Present day ===
At the time of King Charles III's accession to the throne, the 'Household of the former Prince of Wales and Duchess of Cornwall' included two equerries.

As of February 2024 the King's Household included individuals who have served as equerries:

Years	Name	Unit	Notes
2022–	Lieutenant Colonel Jonathan "Jonny" Thompson	Royal Regiment of Scotland	Promoted to Senior Equerry in 2023
2024–2025	Commander Will Thornton	Royal Navy	
2024–	Captain Hugh Scrope	Coldstream Guards	Assistant Equerry
2024–	Captain Kat Anderson	Royal Artillery	Assistant Equerry; first female equerry to any sovereign

Those appointed as extra equerries by King Charles III (since the year 2022) include:

Years	Name	Unit	Notes
2023	Vice Admiral Sir Tom Blackburn	Royal Navy	former Master of the Household
2023	Lieutenant Colonel Sir Andrew Ford	Grenadier Guards/Welsh Guards	former Comptroller, the Lord Chamberlain's Office
2023	Commodore Anthony Morrow	Royal Navy	former commanding officer of HMY Britannia
2023	Admiral Sir George Zambellas	Royal Navy	former First Sea Lord and Chief of the Naval Staff
2023	Lieutenant General Sir Alistair Irwin	Black Watch	former Adjutant-General to the Forces
2023	Lieutenant General Sir John Lorimer	Parachute Regiment	Lieutenant Governor of the Isle of Man
2023	Vice Admiral Sir Anthony Johnstone-Burt	Royal Navy	Master of the Household
2023	Lieutenant Colonel Sir Alexander Matheson of Matheson, 8th Baronet	Coldstream Guards	Senior Gentleman Usher
2023	Lieutenant Colonel Sir Michael Vernon	Coldstream Guards	former Comptroller, the Lord Chamberlain's Office
2023	Lieutenant Colonel Stephen Segrave	Irish Guards	Secretary, Central Chancery of the Orders of Knighthood
2023	Sir Nicholas Bacon, 14th Baronet		former Lord Warden of the Stannaries
2023	Commander Richard Aylard	Royal Navy	former Private Secretary to the Prince of Wales
2023	Major General Arthur Denaro	Queen's Royal Hussars	former Commandant of the Royal Military Academy Sandhurst
2023	Sir Stephen Lamport		former Private Secretary to the Prince of Wales
2023	Ashe Windham	Irish Guards	formerly extra equerry to the Prince of Wales

Since 2022, Queen Camilla has appointed her own equerry, including:

Years	Name	Unit	Notes
2025–	Major Rob Treasure	The Rifles	
2022–2025	Major Oliver Plunket	The Rifles	

Other working members of the Royal Family can also appoint Equerries; in the case of more junior members the appointment might be combined with another post. Like the monarch, they may also appoint extra equerries.

=== Past ===
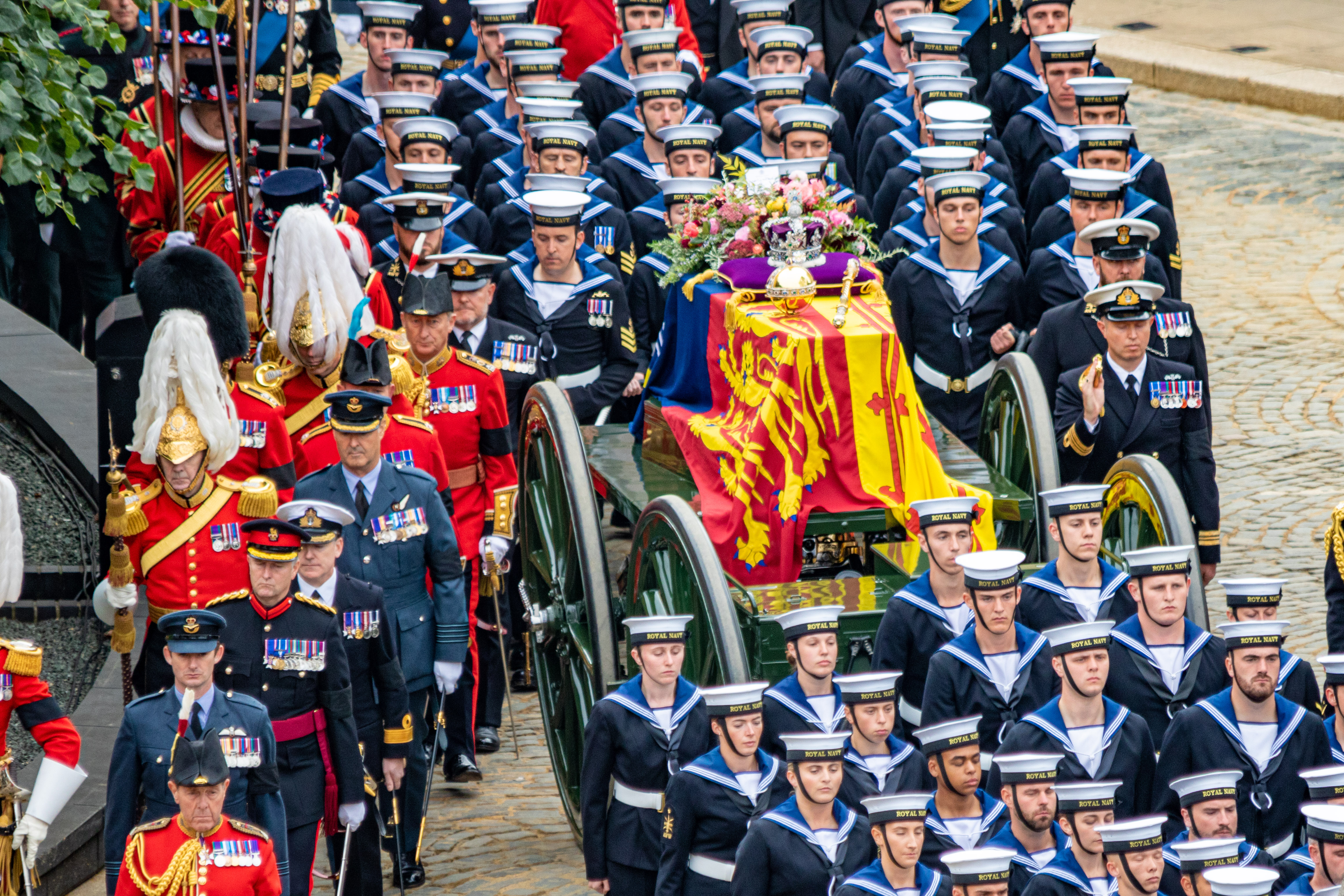
Pallbearers at the funeral of Queen Elizabeth II in 2022: Lt-Col Richards (bottom left), senior equerry since 1999, escorted the coffin on the right-hand side, followed by five former equerries and an extra equerry; out of shot, the junior equerry led a parallel group on the left-hand side.

For most of her reign Queen Elizabeth II maintained an establishment of two equerries plus a temporary equerry: the senior equerry was a permanent appointment (joined to the position of Deputy Master of the Household); whereas the junior equerry (who routinely held office for three years) was appointed in turn from each of the three services of the British Armed Forces. The temporary equerry was a captain of the Coldstream Guards, who provided part-time attendance, and who (when not required for duty) was assigned to regimental or staff duties.

On overseas tours to Commonwealth realms an equerry was often appointed from the local armed forces to serve for the duration of the tour.

At her funeral, the late Queen's senior equerry and junior equerry, ten past equerries and two extra equerries marched together as pallbearers (following a custom established by Queen Victoria); in this role (which is separate from that of the bearer party which carried the coffin) they walked immediately alongside the gun carriage on which the late Queen's coffin rested, in each of the state funeral processions which took place in London and Windsor.

Individuals who served as equerry to Elizabeth II include:

Years	Name	Regiment	Notes
1952–1954	Captain Sir Harold Campbell, KCVO DSO	Royal Navy	
1952–1953	Major Sir Michael Adeane, KCVO CB	Coldstream Guards	
1952–1953	Group Captain Peter Townsend, CVO DSO DFC Bar	Royal Air Force	
1952–1954	Captain Viscount Althorp, MVO	Royal Scots Greys	
1952–1975	Lieutenant-Colonel The Lord Plunket, KCVO	Irish Guards	also Deputy Master of the Household (from 1954)
1952–1953	Wing Commander Peter Horsley, AFC	Royal Air Force	
1953	Major Sepala Attygalle	1st Queen's Dragoon Guards	
1954–1957	Lieutenant-Commander David Loram, LVO	Royal Navy	
1956–1959	Captain Richard Vickers, LVO	Royal Tank Regiment	Temporary
c. 1959	Lieutenant-Commander P C D Campbell	Royal Navy	
1958–1963	Squadron Leader Henton Sylvester Carver, CBE LVO	Royal Air Force	Temporary
c. 1964	Squadron Leader M J P Walmsley	Royal Air Force	
1962–1965	Lieutenant-Commander John Garnier, LVO	Royal Navy	Temporary
1965–1968	Major Charles Howard, LVO	1st Queen's Dragoon Guards	
1968–1971	Lieutenant-Commander Jock Slater, LVO	Royal Navy	
1971–1974	Squadron Leader Peter Beer, LVO	Royal Air Force	
1974–1977	Major G R S Broke, MVO	Royal Artillery	
1976–1994	Lieutenant-Colonel Sir Blair Stewart-Wilson, KCVO	Scots Guards	also Deputy Master of the Household
1977–1980	Lieutenant-Commander Robert Guy, MVO	Royal Navy	
1980–1983	Squadron Leader Adam Wise, LVO MBE	Royal Air Force	
1983–1986	Major Hugh Lindsay, LVO	9th/12th Royal Lancers	
1986–1989	Lieutenant-Commander Timothy Laurence, MVO	Royal Navy	
1989–1992	Squadron Leader David Walker, OBE MVO	Royal Air Force	
1992–1995	Major James Patrick, MVO	Irish Guards	
1994–1999	Lieutenant-Colonel Sir Guy Acland, Bt LVO	Royal Artillery	also Deputy Master of the Household
1995–1998	Lieutenant-Commander Toby Williamson, MVO	Royal Navy	
1998–2001	Squadron Leader Simon Brailsford, MVO	Royal Air Force	
1999–2022	Lieutenant-Colonel Anthony Charles Richards, CVO	Welsh Guards	also Deputy Master of the Household
2001–2004	Major James Duckworth-Chad, MVO	Coldstream Guards	
2004–2007	Commander Heber Ackland, MVO	Royal Navy	
2007–2010	Wing Commander Andrew Calame, MVO MBE	Royal Air Force	
2010–2012	Lieutenant Colonel Dan Rex, MVO	Royal Gurkha Rifles	
2012–2015	Lieutenant Commander Andrew Canale, MVO	Royal Navy	
2015–2017	Wing Commander Samuel P. Fletcher, MVO	Royal Air Force	
2017–2020	Lieutenant-Colonel Nana Kofi Twumasi-Ankrah, MVO	Blues and Royals	
2020–2022	Lieutenant-Colonel Tom White MVO	Royal Marines	

Those appointed by Elizabeth II as extra equerries (since the year 2000) included:

- Lieutenant Colonel Stephen Segrave (Secretary, Central Chancery of the Orders of Knighthood) in 2019
- Lieutenant Colonel Michael Vernon (then Secretary, Central Chancery of the Orders of Knighthood, now Comptroller, the Lord Chamberlain's Office) in 2015
- Vice Admiral Tony Johnstone-Burt (Master of the Household)
- Lieutenant Colonel Alexander Matheson, younger of Matheson (then Secretary, Central Chancery of the Orders of Knighthood, now Senior Gentleman Usher) in 2006
- Lieutenant Colonel Sir Andrew Ford (Comptroller, the Lord Chamberlain's Office) in 2005
- Air Vice Marshal David Walker (Master of the Household) in 2005
- Group Captain Timothy Hewlett (Director of Royal Travel) in 2001
- Vice Admiral Sir James Weatherall (former Marshal of the Diplomatic Corps) in 2001
- Vice Admiral Tom Blackburn (Master of the Household) in 2000
- Lieutenant Colonel Robert Cartwright (Secretary, Central Chancery of the Orders of Knighthood) in 2000

Senior courtiers often continued as extra equerries (or could be appointed to the position) after retirement; as such, they were sometimes called upon to represent the Queen e.g. at funerals or memorial services for former colleagues.

Other senior royals generally followed the Queen's pattern of appointing an equerry from one of the three armed services, in rotation; and of appointing a temporary equerry, often from a regiment with which they had personal links: e.g. the Duke of Edinburgh used to appoint a temporary equerry from the Grenadier Guards, the Queen Mother one from the Irish Guards, the Prince of Wales one from the Welsh Guards.

== See also ==
- Crown Equerry
- Crown Equerry (Sweden)
- Batman (military)
- Adjutant
- Master of the Horse
- Valet
