= William Cubitt (disambiguation) =

William Cubitt (1785–1861) was an English civil engineer and inventor. William Cubitt is also the name of:

- William Cubitt (politician) (1791–1863), English building contractor, Member of Parliament, and Lord Mayor of London
- William George Cubitt (1835–1903), British Indian Army colonel and recipient of the Victoria Cross
- William Cubitt (British Army officer) (born 1959), retired British Army major general

== See also ==
- William Bill Cubit (born 1953), American football coach and former player
