= O'Lone =

O'Lone is a surname. Notable people with the surname include:

- Hugh O'Lone (c. 1836–1871), Canadian politician
- Marcus O'Lone (born 1953), British land agent
