= James Patrick (British Army officer) =

British Army officer

Major James Henry Luxmoore Patrick MVO, was equerry to The Queen 1992–1995.

He obtained a BSC(Hons) at university, and joined the Irish Guards. Patrick was commissioned a second lieutenant in the Territorial Army in 1986. He was promoted to captain on 13 April 1991. He was acting major when equerry to the Queen, and from 15 March 1996.

He was made MVO in 1995. He retired in 1998.
