= Major General Roberts =

Major General Roberts may refer to:

- Frederick Roberts, 1st Earl Roberts (1832–1914), one of the most successful British commanders of the Victorian era
- George Philip Bradley Roberts (1906–1997), British commander of an armoured division during World War II
- Sebastian Roberts (1954–2023), British Army general
