= Michael Lockett (events organiser) =

British businessman and events organiser (born 1948)

Sir Michael Lockett KCVO
- Born: Michael Vernon Lockett; 1948 (age 77–78)
- Occupations: Businessman, public relations executive, events organiser
- Known for: Organising the Diamond Jubilee Pageant (2012) and the Millennium Dome opening night (1999)
- Awards: KCVO (2012); CVO (2002)

Sir Michael Vernon Lockett KCVO (born 1948) is a British businessman, public relations expert, marketer and events organiser. He organised Conservative Party conferences in the 1990s and 2000s, the opening night of the Millennium Dome, and the 2012 Diamond Jubilee Pageant, for which he was knighted.

== Early life and business career ==
The son of an Army officer, Lockett was born in 1948; he did not go to university and worked for Grey Advertising from 1970 to 1975, when he started his own business live marketing, WCT Live; he remained its chairman until 1997, when he sold it to Caribiner International Inc. for $11.7m; he was the chairman of Caribiner Europe until 1999.

== Political events ==
Lockett was in charge of the Prime Minister John Major's presentation unit during the 1992 general election. In 1993, he founded CCO Conferences, a company which he chaired and which was responsible for organising Conservative Party conferences from 1994, removing the rows of on-stage seating for senior politicians and advising them to remove their jackets when participating in question and answer sessions with party members. Lockett also organised Major's 1997 election tour and under William Hague was commissioned to make the party conferences "bright, vibrant and open" in appearance. He continued to be chairman of CCO Conferences until 2009, and assisted organising David Cameron's leadership campaign in 2005.

== Millennium Dome ==
Lockett had marketed British Airways's Club Europe in the early 1990s, bringing him into contact with BA's chief executive officer, Bob Ayling, who was also chairman of the public-sector New Millennium Experience Company, which was overseeing the delivery of the Millennium celebrations in the United Kingdom. Ayling invited Lockett to be project director overseeing the Millennium Dome's opening night; his company, Live Productions, was hired to organise the event and attracted criticism after failing to post 3,000 of the 10,500 public tickets on time.

== Royal and national events ==
From 2000 to 2008, Lockett was chairman of Live Communications, and was hired to organise the Queen's Golden Jubilee concert in 2002; he was appointed a Commander of the Royal Victorian Order for his services. Between 2011 and 2013, he was chief executive of the Thames Diamond Jubilee Foundation and was therefore responsible for organising the Diamond Jubilee Pageant on the River Thames. For this work, he was promoted to Knight Commander of the Royal Victorian Order in the 2012 Jubilee Honours. He was also involved in organising the 2012 Olympics Opening Ceremony in London. His company, Aura Events (of which he was chairman from 2005 to 2012), was also responsible for the opening of The Shard building in London.
