= Nana Kofi Twumasi-Ankrah =

British Army officer

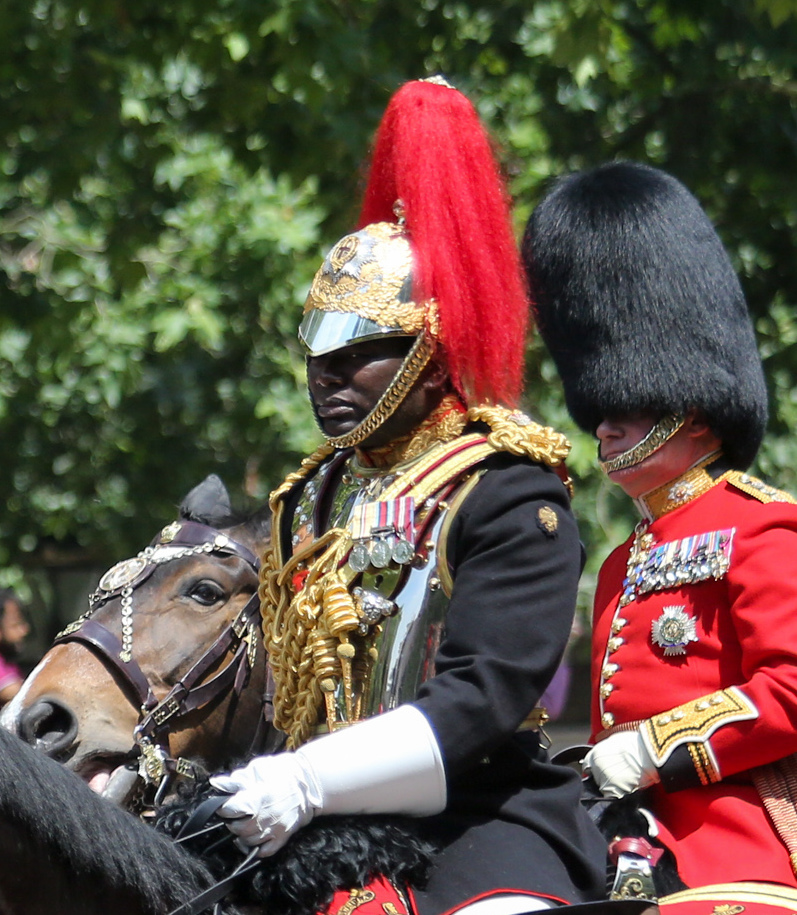
- Riding in Trooping the Colour, 2018
- Born: 1979 (age 46–47); Ghana
- Spouse: Joanna Hanna-Grindall (m. 2012)
- Military career
- Allegiance: United Kingdom
- Branch: British Army
- Rank: Lieutenant Colonel
- Unit: Household Cavalry
- Conflicts: Afghanistan War and Iraq War
- Awards: Member of the Royal Victorian Order

Lieutenant Colonel Nana Kofi Twumasi-Ankrah, MVO (born 1979) is a Ghanaian-born officer in the British Army. Appointed by Queen Elizabeth II as her equerry, he was the first black man to hold this position. Twumasi-Ankrah is an officer of the Household Cavalry and a veteran of the war in Afghanistan and Iraq.

== Early life and education ==
Nana Twumasi-Ankrah was born in Ghana in 1979 and moved to the United Kingdom with his parents in 1982 when he was three years old. His father is a former Head of Military Intelligence for the Ghanaian Army. Having completed his schooling, he then studied at Queen Mary & Westfield College, London. Whilst at university, he became a member of the University of London Officer Training Corps.

== Military career ==
Having attended the Royal Military Academy Sandhurst, Twumasi-Ankrah was commissioned as a second lieutenant in the Blues and Royals, British Army, on 12 April 2003, with seniority in that rank from 15 April 2000. He was promoted the same day to lieutenant with seniority from 15 April 2002. He was the first black African British Army officer to be commissioned directly into the Household Cavalry. He was promoted to captain on 28 March 2006, and to major on 31 July 2012.

He became known to the public in 2011 when he acted as escort commander at the Royal wedding of Prince William and Catherine Middleton and was seen alongside the 1902 State Landau in the carriage procession from Westminster Abbey to Buckingham Palace. Twumasi-Ankrah was appointed as commander of the Blues and Royals at the Trooping the Colour ceremony during the Queen's birthday celebrations the same year.

=== Equerry appointment ===
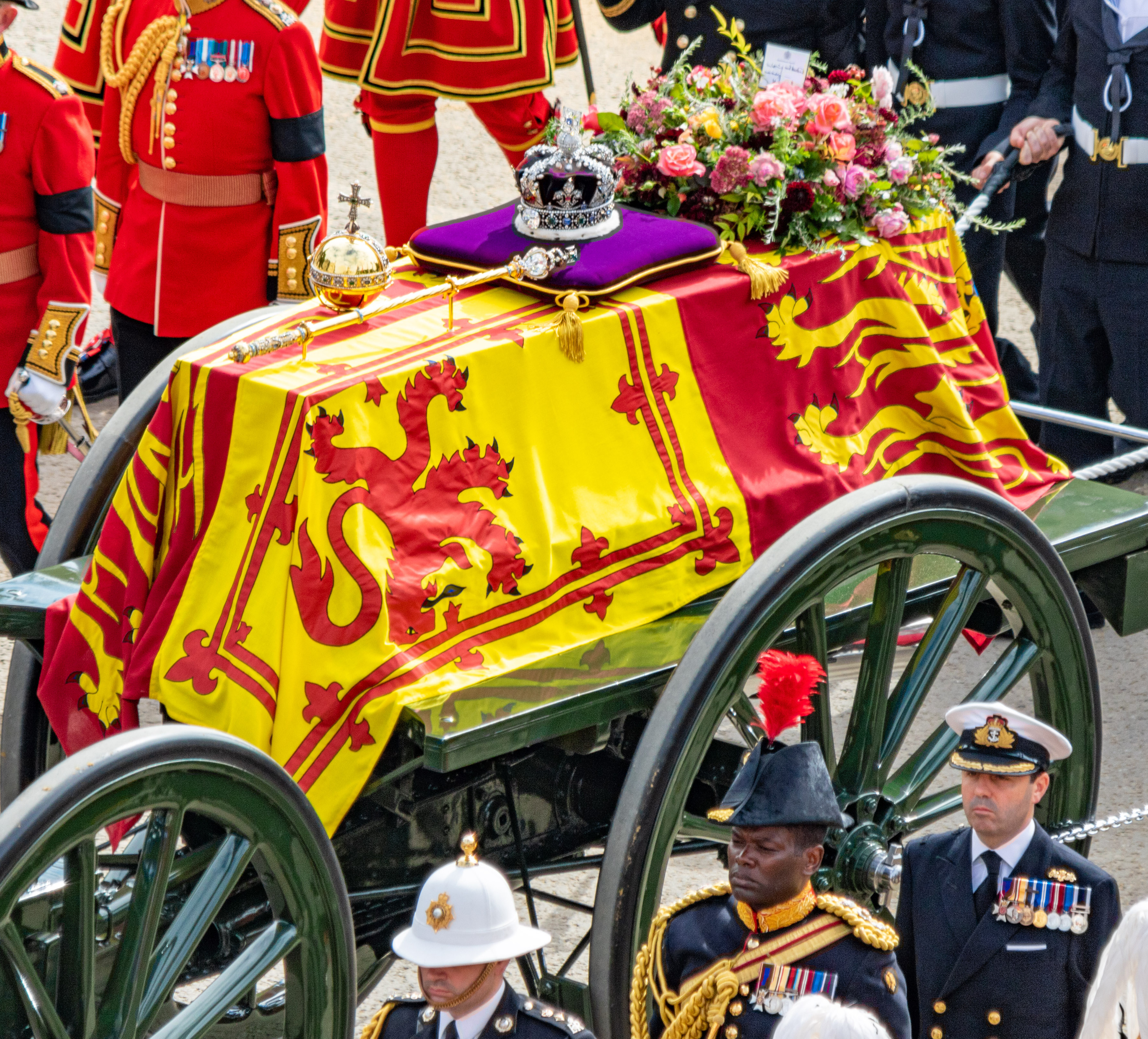
Queen Elizabeth II's funeral procession in 2022, with Twumasi-Ankrahas (bottom, centre) a pallbearer

In July 2017, Twumasi-Ankrah was named by Queen Elizabeth II as her equerry. The appointment made him the first black man to perform that role. He succeeded Wing Commander Sam Fletcher, who stepped down from the position in 2017. The equerry is considered one of the most important and senior positions in the royal household, requiring his attendance at official engagements at Buckingham Palace and other Royal residences. The position is reserved for an officer of one of the armed services and lasts for a period of three years.

At Windsor Castle on 27 November 2020, Twumasi-Ankrah was received by the Queen, who invested him with the MVO upon relinquishing his appointment as Equerry.

During Queen Elizabeth's state funeral processions in both London and Windsor, Twumasi-Ankrah, was among the group of pallbearers that included 12 former Equerries. This group, adhering to a tradition established during Queen Victoria's reign, marched alongside the late Queen's coffin as part of their ceremonial role. Unlike the bearer party, which was responsible for physically carrying the coffin, these pallbearers walked immediately adjacent to it.

=== Later service ===
On 30 June 2021, he was promoted to lieutenant colonel.

== Personal life ==
On 2 June 2012, Twumasi-Ankrah married Joanna Hanna-Grindall, who is a senior corporate partnerships manager at the Victoria and Albert Museum. The couple have three children. He is known as TA amongst his Army colleagues. He is President of the Waterloo Branch of the Royal Society of Saint George.
