= Platinum Jubilee Celebration: A Gallop Through History =

2022 equestrian event

- Date: 12–15 May 2022
- Venue: Windsor Castle
- Theme: Platinum Jubilee of Elizabeth II
- Website: platinumjubilee.com

Platinum Jubilee Celebration: A Gallop Through History was an equestrian event held in the grounds of Windsor Castle on four evenings from 12 to 15 May 2022, as part of Elizabeth II's Platinum Jubilee celebrations.

== Programme ==
The event featured some of the world's greatest equestrian displays. Each night, the event was attended by members of the royal family, including the Duke and Duchess of Gloucester, the Earl and Countess of Wessex and Forfar, the Princess Royal, and the Queen, who attended on 15 May. Princess Beatrice and her husband, Edoardo Mapelli Mozzi also attended the charity preview of the event.

Split into four acts, "Queen Elizabeth I", "The Crown, Lost and Found", "The Crown Around the World", and "One United Kingdom Under One Crown", the show featured more than 1,000 performers and 500 horses, and told the story of the monarchy from Queen Elizabeth I to Queen Elizabeth II.

=== Act 1: Queen Elizabeth I ===
The first act focused on the reign of Queen Elizabeth I, which took the audience on a journey from the Spanish Armada through to Queen Elizabeth I's Tilbury speech. It also featured the celebrities of the time including playwrights William Shakespeare and Christopher Marlowe. Both the Corps of Drums of Her Majesty's Royal Marines and the Pony Club featured in this act; the Pony Club acted as the Queen's messengers, bringing news to the herald on the progress of the war with the Spanish Armada.

=== Act 2: The Crown, Lost and Found ===
The second act explored the era of James I, the Gunpowder Plot, the time of Oliver Cromwell, the death of Charles I and then the restoration of Charles II. The act also featured a segment on King Louis XIV of France, which included a performance from La Garde Republicaine from France. The Household Cavalry Musical Ride also performed in this act.

=== Act 3: The Crown Around the World ===
The third act showcased the United Kingdom's history of world exploration, with a focus on famous explorers including Edmund Hillary, Walter Raleigh, Francis Drake, James Cook, Captain Bligh, Scott of the Antarctic, David Livingstone and Henry Morton Stanley. The act featured international displays, including the Secret Drum Corps from Switzerland, Kings Guard of Norway, The Royal Cavalry of Oman, Emerald Storm from Northern Ireland, The Bollywood Company from India, Trinidad and Tobago Defence Force Steel Orchestra, The Santa Siberian Huskies and Azerbaijan – Land of Fire. Comedy characters Barrington and Billington entertained crowds throughout the act.

=== Act 4: One United Kingdom under One Crown ===
The fourth and the last act celebrated the strength of the UK's four nations and the Commonwealth, as well as Queen Elizabeth II and her achievements over the past seventy years. Performances were given by the Kings Troop, Massed Pipes and Drums, Dancers of the Royal Edinburgh Military Tattoo, Emerald Storm and the Academy Voices (Welsh Choir). The act ended with a focus on the Queen's love of horses. The finale of this segment featured a parade of state coaches and royal carriages and the Queen's show horses and ponies.

== Performers ==
Performers included:

- Royal Cavalry of Oman
- Equestrian Federation of Azerbaijan
- His Majesty the King's Guard 3rd Company (Norway)
- Republican Guard (France)
- Top Secret Drum Corps (Switzerland)
- Band of the Royal Marines
- King's Troop, Royal Horse Artillery
- Mounted Band of the Household Cavalry and Musical Drive
- The Musical Ride of the Royal Canadian Mounted Police
- The Academy Voices (Welsh Choir)
- Emerald Storm (northern Irish Dancers)
- The Edinburgh Tattoo Dance Troop
- Massed Pipes and Drums
- The Bollywood Company
- Trinidad and Tobago Defence Force Steel Band
- The DAKS Pony Club Mounted Games

Dame Helen Mirren played the role of Queen Elizabeth I with Omid Djalili as a court herald, and singers Katherine Jenkins, Gregory Porter and Keala Settle also gave performances. Julie Etchingham and Phillip Schofield presented coverage of the event from a studio, along with Adjoa Andoh, Martin Clunes, Tom Cruise, Damian Lewis and Alan Titchmarsh in the arena.

Members of the Royal Canadian Mounted Police's Musical Ride performed ceremonial duties on former Musical Ride horses that were gifted to the Queen.

The Queen's youngest granddaughter, Lady Louise Mountbatten-Windsor, drove in the carriage that once belonged to her grandfather, the Duke of Edinburgh, and had been featured in his funeral.

== Broadcasting ==
The event was broadcast live on ITV at 20:00 BST on Sunday 15 May 2022.

== See also ==
- The World Comes to Windsor, similar 2012 pageant
