= Anthony Charles Richards =

British Army officer (born 1953)

Sir Anthony Richards
- Born: 1953 (age 72–73)
- Military career
- Allegiance: United Kingdom
- Branch: British Army
- Service years: 1973-present
- Rank: Lieutenant Colonel
- Unit: Welsh Guards
- Awards: Knight Commander of the Royal Victorian Order

Lieutenant Colonel Sir Anthony Charles Richards KCVO DL (born 1953) is a British Army officer, who served as Equerry to Queen Elizabeth II from 1999 until her death in 2022, and Deputy Master of the Household of the Royal Household from 1999 to 2023.

== Career ==
Richards was educated at Marlborough College. After attending the Royal Military Academy, Sandhurst he commissioned into the Welsh Guards, in which he served 1973–1999. Since 1999 he has been on retired pay.

From 1973 to 1982 he served with the 1st Battalion of the Welsh Guards in the United Kingdom, and the British Army of the Rhine (BAOR). He was seconded to the 1st Battalion of the 2nd Gurkha Rifles in Hong Kong (1982–1984). He attended the Staff College, Camberley and qualified for the staff (psc) in 1985. In the same year he was promoted to major. From 1986 to 1990 he was in the BAOR.

Between 1990 and 1992 Richards was second in command of the 1st Battalion of the Welsh Guards in the United Kingdom. He was then Staff Officer Headquarters London District (1992–1994). Promoted to Lieutenant Colonel, he was Equerry to the Duke of Edinburgh (1994–1997), Followed by being Divisional Lieutenant-Colonel Foot Guards (1997–1999).

== Honours ==
Richards was appointed Member of the Royal Victorian Order (MVO) in 1997, and promoted to lieutenant (LVO) in the 2006 New Year Honours. In the 2012 Diamond Jubilee Honours, he was further promoted to commander (CVO). Following his departure from the Royal Household in November 2023, he was knighted as Knight Commander of the Royal Victorian Order (KCVO).

In 2025, Richards was appointed a deputy lieutenant (DL) of Leicestershire by Lord-Lieutenant Mike Kapur.
