= John Hessell Tiltman (property manager) =

British architect and property manager

Sir John Hessell Tiltman, KCVO (born 1942) is a retired British architect and property manager.

After complete a Diploma in Architecture at Brighton College of Art in 1965, Tiltman joined Greater London Council as an architect. Between 1969 and 1990, he was employed by the Department of the Environment's Property Services Agency, for the final two years as Head of the Royal Palaces Group. In 1991, he was appointed Deputy Director of Property Services in the Royal Household; after the fire at Windsor Castle in 1992, he was made director of the reconstruction project; on completion of the work in 1997, he was appointed a Lieutenant of the Royal Victorian Order. In 1996, he was promoted to Director of Property Services. He retired in 2003 and was appointed a Knight Commander of the Royal Victorian Order.
