= Andrew Ford (courtier) =

Lieutenant Colonel Sir Andrew Charles Ford, GCVO (born 5 February 1957) is a retired British Army officer, and current member of the Royal Households of the United Kingdom. From 6 January 2006 to December 2018, he served as Comptroller of the Lord Chamberlain's Office.

== Military career ==
Following Royal Military Academy Sandhurst, Ford was commissioned into the Grenadier Guards as a second lieutenant on a Short Service Commission on 8 April 1977. He was promoted lieutenant on 8 April 1979, and switched to a full commission on 21 August 1978. He was promoted captain on 8 October 1983, major on 30 September 1989, and lieutenant-colonel on 30 June 1998. He transferred to the Welsh Guards on 27 August 1999, and retired on 4 October 2005 (retaining a reserve commission); he also attended the Joint Service Defence College.

== Later life ==
Ford took office as Comptroller of the Lord Chamberlain's Office on 6 January 2006. The Lord Chamberlain's Office is a department within the British Royal Household. It is concerned with matters such as protocol, state visits, investitures, garden parties, the State Opening of Parliament, royal weddings and funerals. The Comptroller is the full-time head of department, responsible to the part-time Lord Chamberlain. In 2023, he was appointed Chair of the Governors of Bancroft's School in Woodford Green.

== Honours and decorations ==
Ford was appointed Knight Commander of the Royal Victorian Order (KCVO) in the 2012 Birthday Honours. He was appointed a Knight Grand Cross of the Royal Victorian Order (GCVO) upon relinquishing his appointment as Comptroller on 11 December 2018. He represented the Order at the 2023 Coronation.
