= Irish Guards =

Infantry regiment of the British Army

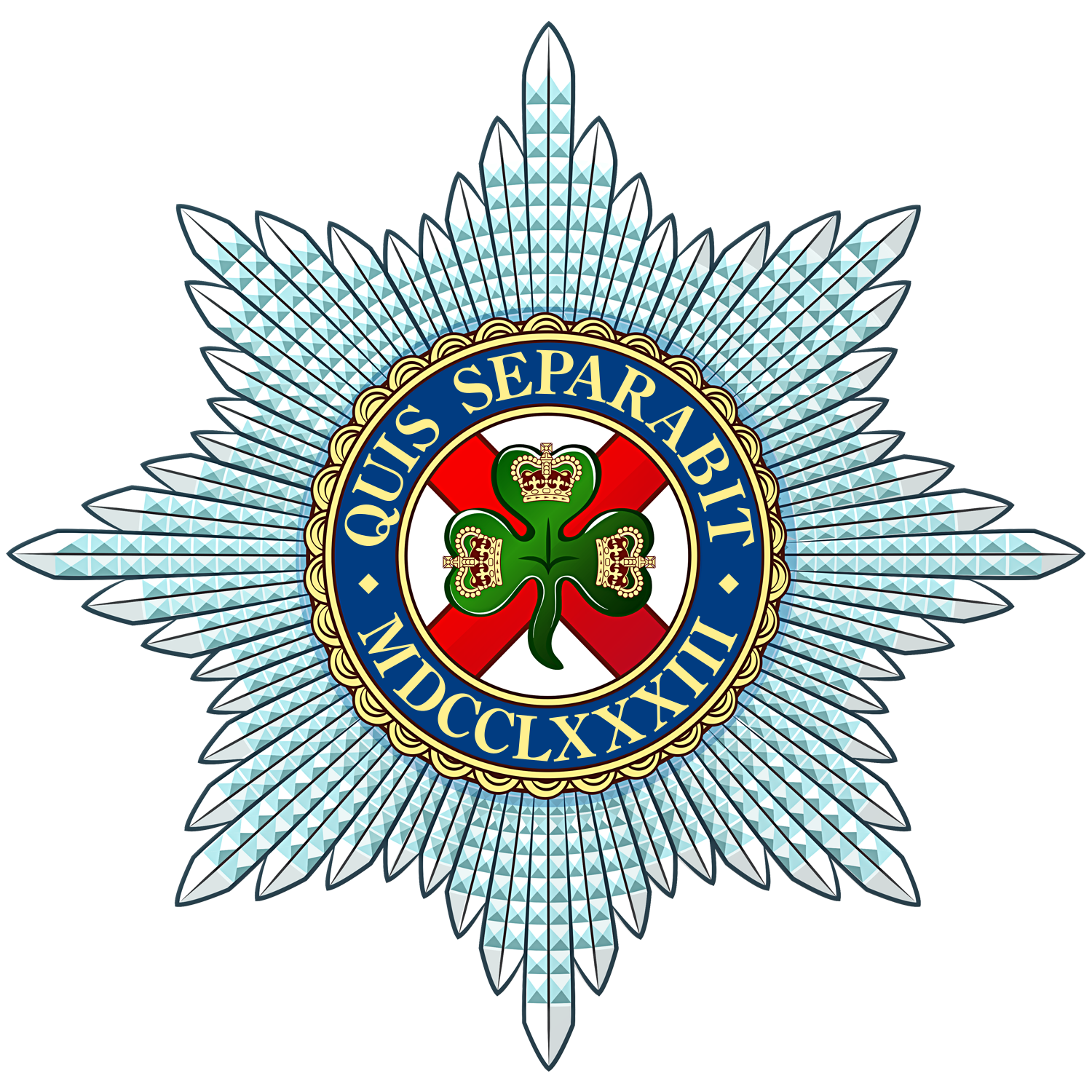
- Regimental badge of the Irish Guards (Note: The breast star of the Order of St Patrick.)
- Active: 1 April 1900 – present
- Country: United Kingdom
- Branch: British Army
- Type: Infantry
- Role: 1st Battalion – Next Generation Combat Team 2nd Battalion – Public Duties; No. 9 Company; No. 12 Company 1st Battalion London Guards; No. 15 Company – Irish Guards Reserve (Loos)
- Size: Two battalion Five companies and three independent companies
- Part of: Guards and Parachute Division
- Garrison/HQ: RHQ – Wellington Barracks, London; 1st Battalion – Mons Barracks Aldershot Garrison; 2nd Battalion – Mons Barracks Aldershot Garrison; No 15 (Loos) Company, Irish Guards - Camberwell, S.London
- Nicknames: The Micks; Fighting Micks
- Motto: Latin: Quis Separabit? ('Who Shall Separate [Us]?')
- March: Quick – St Patrick's Day; Slow – Let Erin Remember
- Mascot: Irish Wolfhound

Commanders
- Colonel-in-Chief: King Charles III
- Colonel of the Regiment: Catherine, Princess of Wales

Insignia
- Tactical Recognition Flash
- Tartan: Saffron (pipes)
- Plume: St. Patrick's blue Right side of Bearskin cap
- Abbreviation: IG

The Irish Guards (IG) is one of the Foot Guards regiments of the British Army and is part of the Guards Division. Together with the Royal Irish Regiment, it is one of the two Irish infantry regiments in the British Army. The regiment has participated in campaigns in the First World War, the Second World War, the Iraq War and the War in Afghanistan as well as numerous other operations throughout its history. The Irish Guards claim six Victoria Cross recipients, four from the First World War and two from the Second World War.

== History ==
The Irish Guards were formed on 1 April 1900 by order of Queen Victoria to commemorate the Irishmen who fought in the Second Boer War for the British Empire.

=== First World War ===
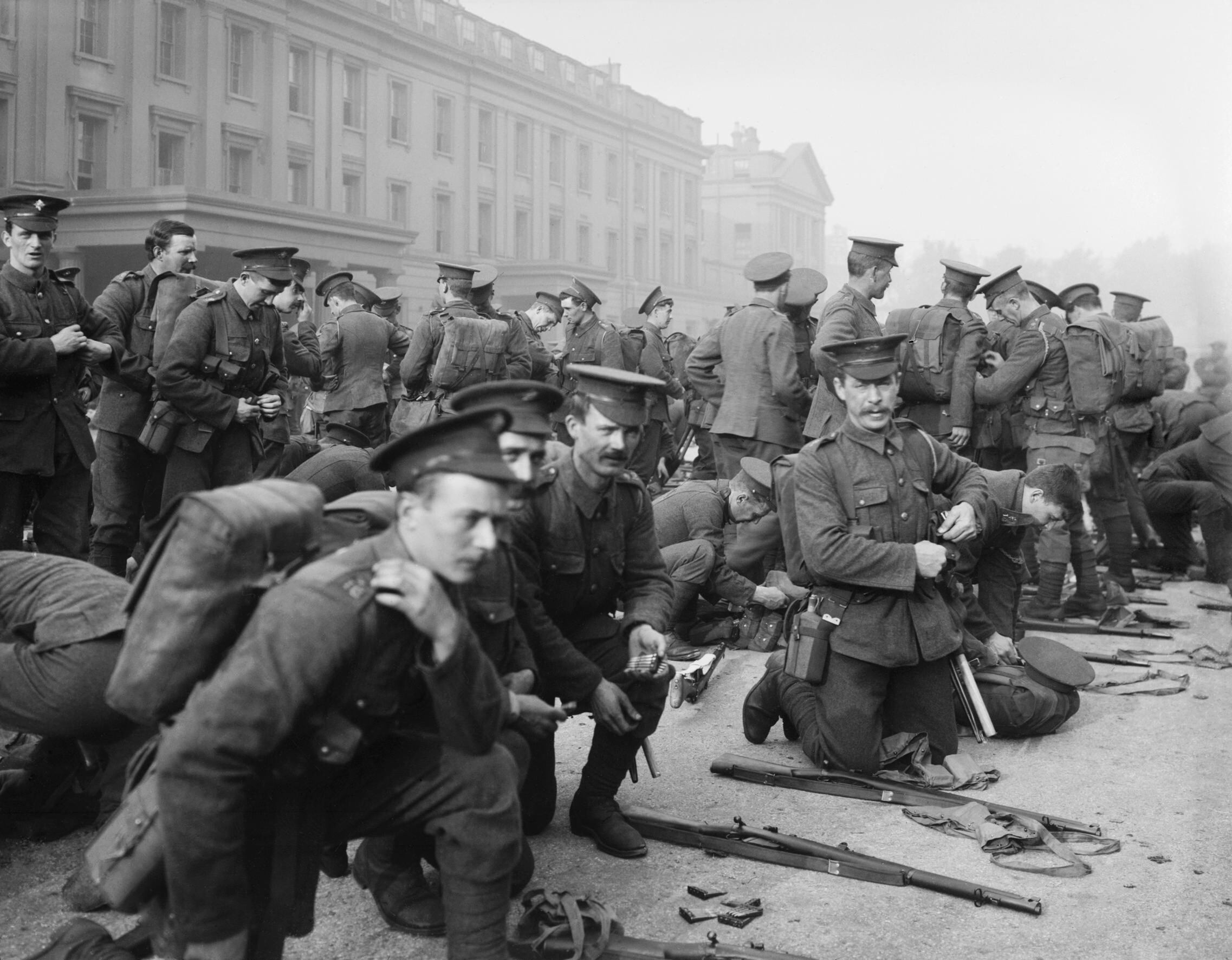
1st Battalion, Irish Guards prepare to leave Wellington Barracks, Westminster, London, following the outbreak of the First World War, 6 August 1914. The Battalion arrived in France as part of the British Expeditionary Force on 13 August 1914.

Following the outbreak of the First World War, 1st Battalion Irish Guards was deployed to France almost immediately, and they remained on the Western Front for the duration of the war. During the early part of the war, the battalion took part in the Battle of Mons and formed the Allied rearguard during the Great Retreat. The battalion then took part in one of the bloodiest battles of 1914, the First Battle of Ypres, which began on 19 October, inflicting major casualties among the old Regular Army.

The 1st Battalion was involved in fighting for the duration of 'First Ypres', at Langemarck, Gheluvelt and Nonne Bosschen. The 1st Battalion suffered huge casualties between 1–8 November holding the line against near defeat by German forces, while defending Klein Zillebeke.

In May 1915, the 1st Battalion took part in the Battle of Festubert, though did not see much action. Two further battalions were formed for the regiment in July. In September that year, all three battalions took part in the Battle of Loos, which lasted from 25 September until early October.

The Irish Guards went into action again on 1 July 1916 when the Battle of the Somme began. The 1st Battalion took part in an action at Flers–Courcelette where they suffered severe casualties in the attack in the face of withering fire from the German machine-guns. The battalion also took part in the action at Morval before they were relieved by the 2nd Battalion.

In 1917 the Irish Guards took part in the Battle of Pilckem which began on 31 July during the Third Battle of Ypres. The Irish Guards also took part in the Battle of Cambrai that year. In 1918 the regiment fought in a number of engagements during the Second Battle of the Somme, including at Arras and Albert. The regiment then went on to take part in a number of battles during the British offensives against the Hindenburg Line. On 11 November 1918 the Armistice with Germany was signed. The 1st Battalion was at Maubeuge when the Armistice was signed.

== Between the wars ==
The regiment's continued existence was threatened briefly when Winston Churchill, who served as Secretary of State for War between 1919 and 1921, sought the elimination of the Irish Guards and Welsh Guards as an economy measure. This proposal, however, did not find favour in government or army circles and was dropped. Between the wars, the regiment was deployed at various times to Turkey, Gibraltar, Egypt and Palestine.

=== Second World War ===
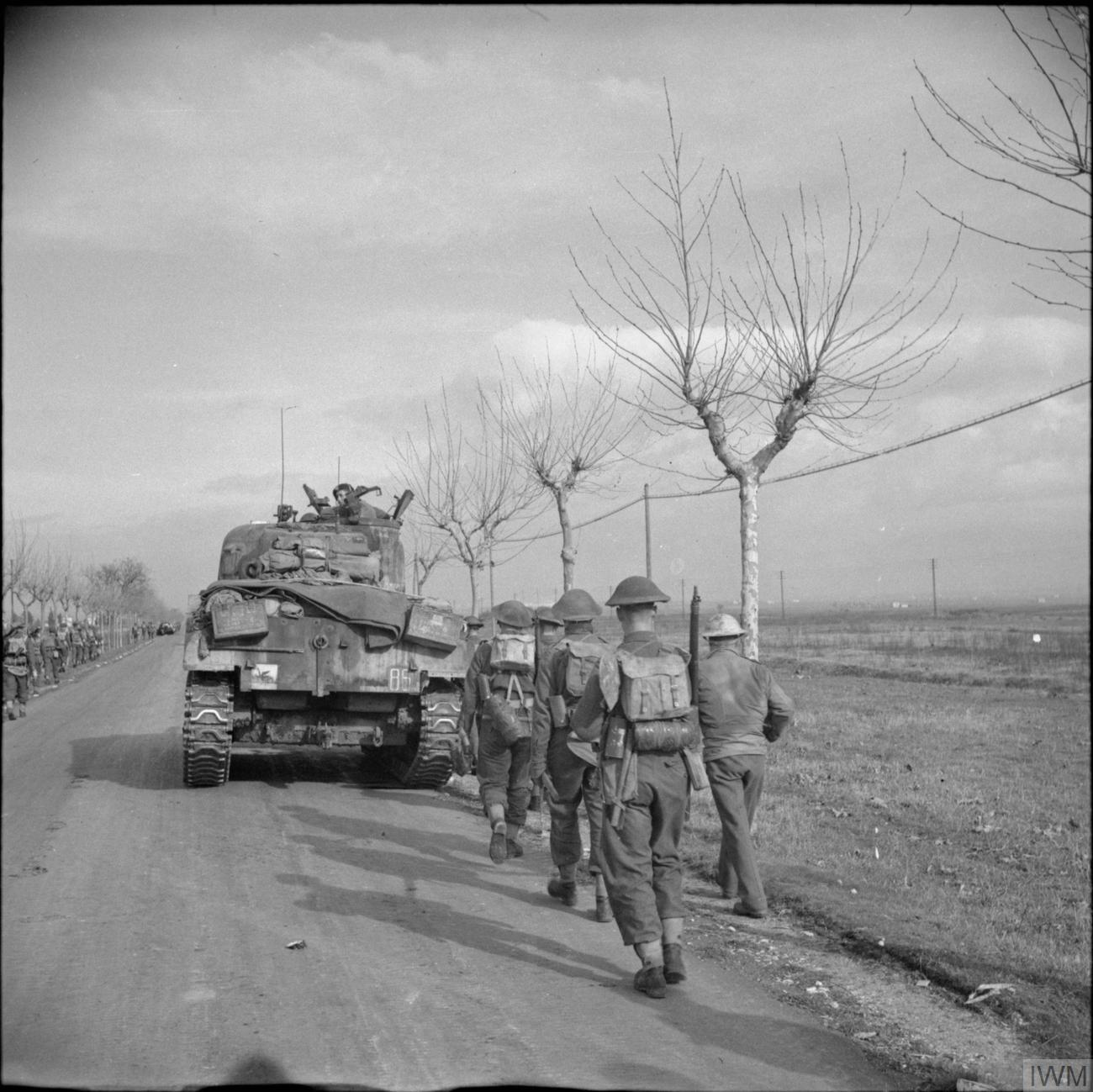
Guardsmen of the 1st Battalion, Irish Guards, advancing north of Anzio, Italy, 25 January 1944.

During the Second World War, the regiment fought in Norway, France, North Africa, Italy, Belgium, Netherlands and Germany. The regiment first saw combat during the Norwegian Campaign. Following a challenging sea voyage to Norway, the 1st Battalion arrived in May 1940 and fought for two days at the town of Pothus before they were forced to retreat. The Irish Guards conducted a fighting withdrawal and served as the Allied rearguard.

The battalion was evacuated along with the rest of the expeditionary force in June. While the 1st Battalion was fighting in Norway, the 2nd Battalion was deployed to the Hook of Holland to cover the evacuation of the Dutch royal family and Government in May 1940. The 2nd Battalion was then deployed to France and ordered to defend the port of Boulogne. The guardsmen held out against overwhelming odds for three days, buying valuable time for the Dunkirk Evacuation, before they were evacuated themselves. In November 1942, Jean, Grand Duke of Luxembourg joined the British Army as a volunteer in the Irish Guards.

In March 1943 the 1st Battalion landed, with the rest of the 24th Guards Brigade, in Tunisia, to fight in the final stages of the campaign in North Africa. The battalion saw extensive action while fighting through Tunisia and was subsequently deployed to the Italian Front in December of that year. The battalion took part in the Anzio landings on 22 January 1944. They also participated in the fierce fighting around the Allied beachhead and suffered severe casualties fighting off a German counterattack at Campoleone after which the depleted battalion was returned to the UK in April.

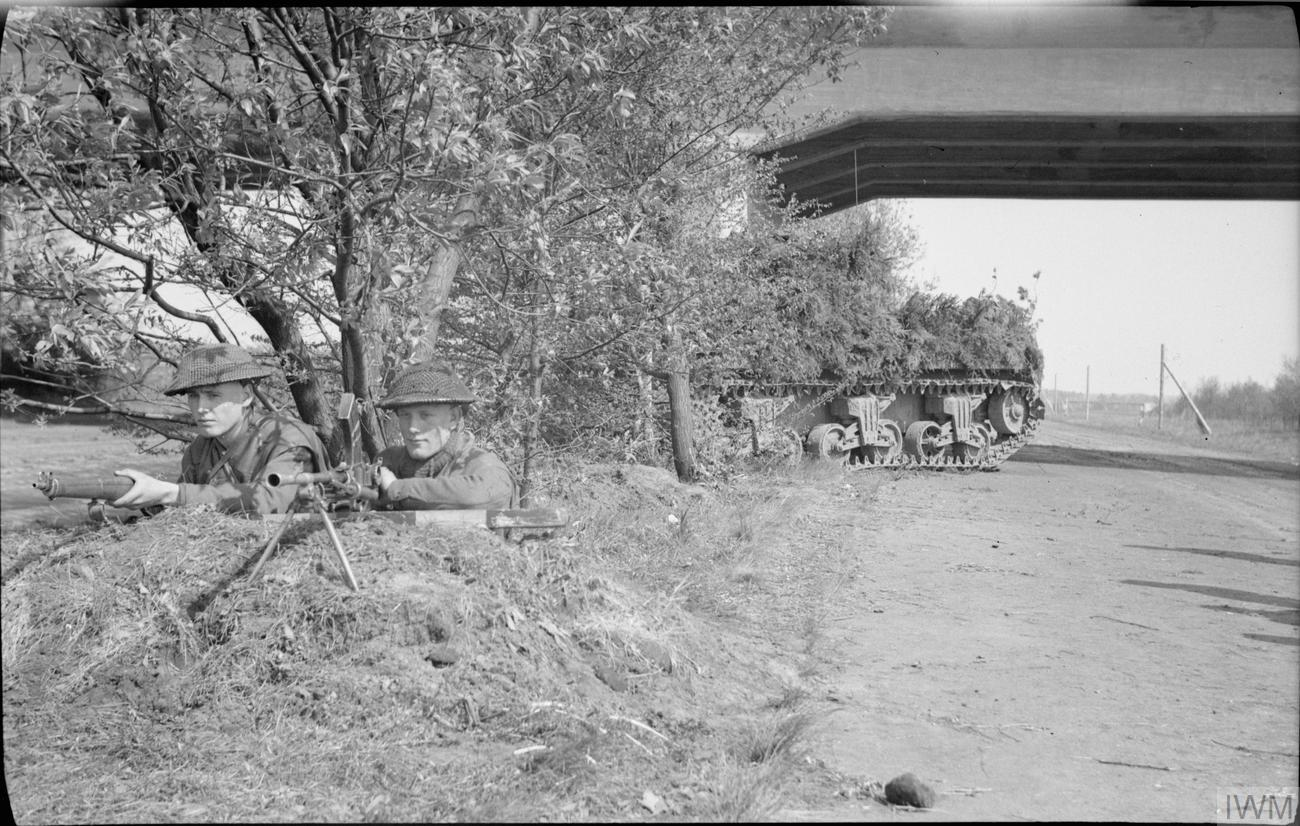
Two Irish Guardsmen and a camouflaged Sherman Firefly guard a section of the Bremen-Hamburg autobahn, 20 April 1945.

The Irish Guards returned to France in June 1944 when the 2nd and 3rd Battalions took part in the Normandy Campaign. Both battalions served as part of the Guards Armoured Division and took part in the attempt to capture Caen as part of Operation Goodwood. They also saw action in the Mont Pincon area. On 29 August, the 3rd Battalion crossed the Seine and began the advance into Belgium with the rest of the Guards Armoured Division towards Brussels.

The Irish Guards were part of the ground force of Operation Market Garden, 'Market' being the airborne assault and 'Garden' the ground attack. The Irish Guards led the vanguard of XXX Corps in their advance towards Arnhem, which was the objective of the British 1st Airborne Division, furthest from XXX Corps' start line. The Corps crossed the Belgian-Dutch border, advancing from Neerpelt on 17 September but the Irish Guards encountered heavy resistance which slowed the advance. Following the conclusion of Market Garden, the Irish Guards remained in the Netherlands until taking part in the Allied advance into Germany and seeing heavy action during the Rhineland Campaign with Guardsman Edward Charlton earning the final Victoria Cross to be awarded in the European theatre.

=== 1945–2019 ===
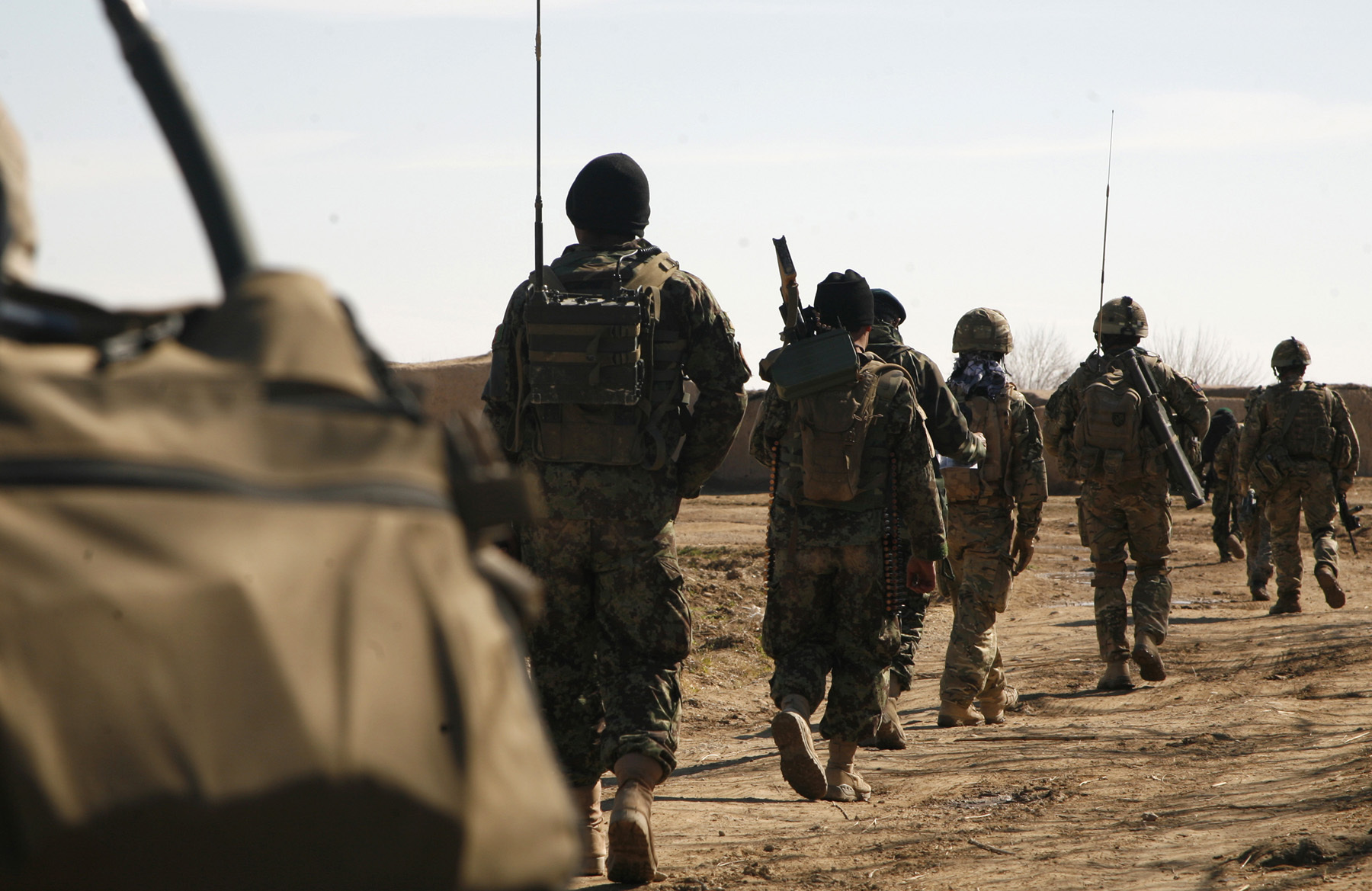
1st Battalion, Irish Guards Brigade Advisory Group move on patrol with Afghan National Army soldier during Operation Omid Shash in Gereshk, Helmand province. (2011)

After the war, the regiment was reduced to a single battalion, with the 2nd Battalion being placed in suspended animation and the 3rd Battalion being disbanded. In 1947, the 1st Battalion deployed to Palestine to perform internal security duties there. It was then posted to the Suez Canal Zone in Egypt, remaining there until the British withdrawal in 1956. The regiment continued to serve in troubled regions such as Cyprus and Aden throughout the 1950s and 1960s. During this time they were also part of the British Army of the Rhine (BAOR) in Germany on a number of occasions. They also served as the garrison of Hong Kong from 1970 to 1972. In 1973 the 1st Battalion served in British Honduras. During their tour, the country became Belize.

The Irish Guards were one of the few regiments in the British Army initially exempt from service in Northern Ireland during The Troubles. However, a Provisional Irish Republican Army (IRA) bomb blasted a bus carrying members of the regiment band to Chelsea Barracks in October 1981. 39 people (23 soldiers and 16 others) were wounded and two civilians were killed. 1992 saw the regiment finally carry out its first tour-of-duty in Northern Ireland, based in County Fermanagh.

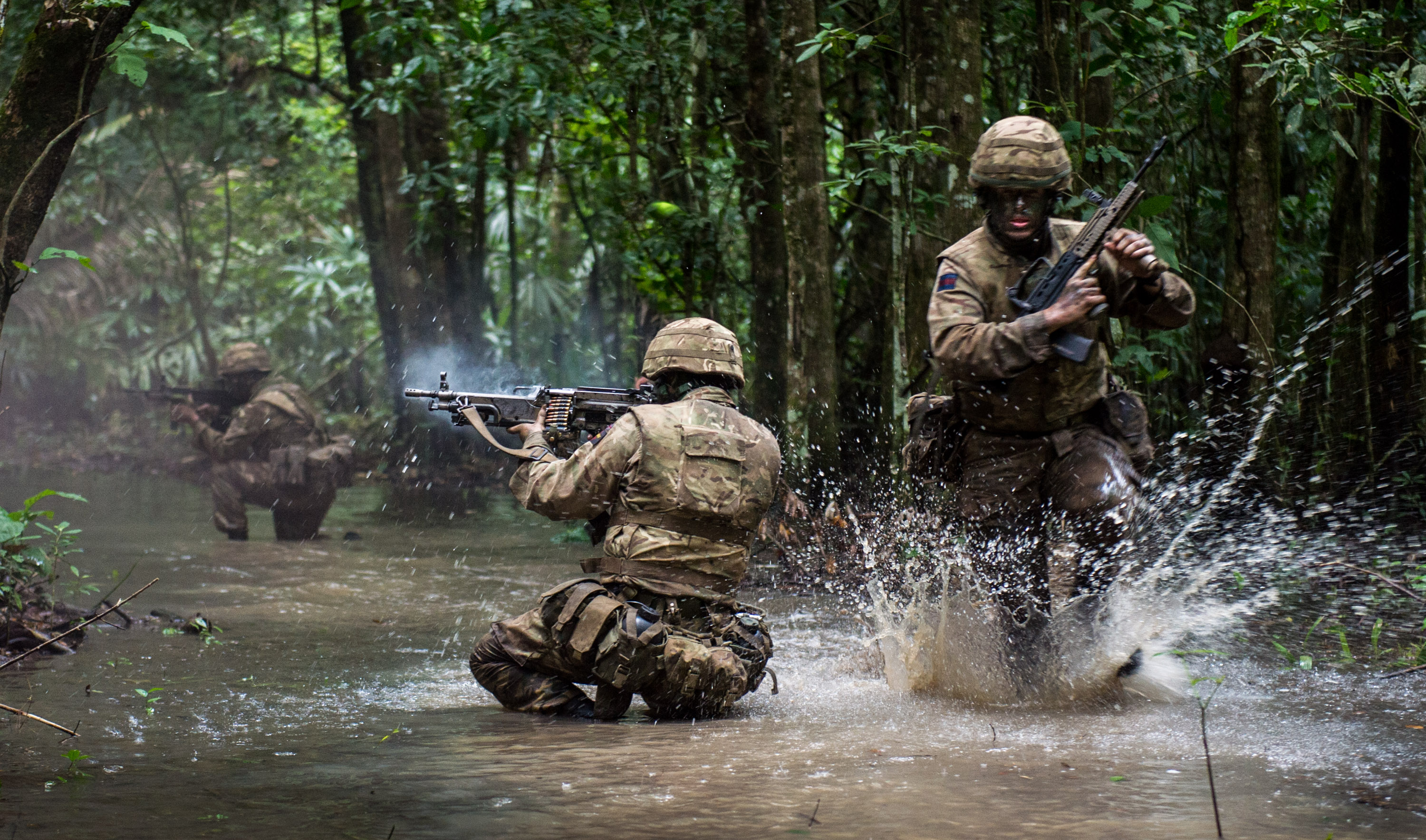
Irish Guards during a training exercise in Belize. (2016)

The Irish Guards were involved in the Balkans Conflicts when they were deployed to Macedonia and Kosovo in 1999 and were the first British unit to enter the Kosovan capital city of Pristina on 12 June. The regiment played a significant role in the initial stages of the Iraq War as part of the 7th Armoured Brigade and they led the British advance into Basra in March 2003. The Irish Guards deployed to Iraq on Operation Telic 10 in 2007. In 2010, the regiment deployed on their first tour of duty to Afghanistan. Number 2 Company deployed to Afghanistan in 2013 as a Brigade Operations Company.

In 2014 the entire regiment deployed to Cyprus to patrol the buffer zone as part of Operation Tosca 20. Following the Manchester Arena bombing, the Irish Guards were deployed in London to guard key locations, including the Ministry of Defence building in Whitehall, as part of Operation Temperer. Later that year Number 1 Company deployed to the Falkland Islands as the Roulement Infantry Company while Number 2 Company deployed to Thailand on an overseas training exercise where they worked alongside the Thai Army.

=== 2019–2020 ===
December 2019 saw the Irish Guards deploy on two operations concurrently. Number 1 Company deployed to South Sudan on Operation Trenton and the rest of the battalion deployed to Iraq on Operation Shader, training Iraqi Security Forces in the mission to defeat Daesh. However, the deployment rapidly changed in January 2020 with the escalation of the 2019–20 Persian Gulf crisis following the American strike on Major General Qasem Soleimani. The Irish Guards' mission changed from training to force protection in order to protect British assets in Iraq from possible retaliation by Iran. Eventual de-escalation saw the Irish Guards resume their original mission.

== Role and organisation ==
In the light infantry role the 1st Battalion comprised five companies; Nos. 1, 2, 3 and 4 Companies, and the Headquarters Company. Following the Integrated Review and after the Queen's Birthday Parade 2022, 1st Battalion took on the security force assistance role for 4 years. With a much-reduced establishment, this role required a substantial readjustment to the battalion. Concurrently, the Irish Guards raised two public duties incremental companies (PDICs). These are Numbers 9 and 12 Companies, taking on Irish Guardsmen fresh out of the Infantry Training Centre before the young soldiers progress to the 1st Battalion. Nos. 9 and 12 Company carry on the customs and traditions of the former 2nd Battalion, Irish Guards. Finally there is Number 15 Company in the Army Reserve, based at Flodden Road, London, which is operationally organised as part of 1st Battalion, London Guards.

== Recruitment ==
The regiment recruits in Northern Ireland and among residents of Irish extraction in Great Britain. Restrictions in Ireland's Defence Act make it illegal to induce, procure or persuade enlistment of any citizen of Ireland into the military of another state.

== Uniform ==
Irish Guards – Full Dress Drummers

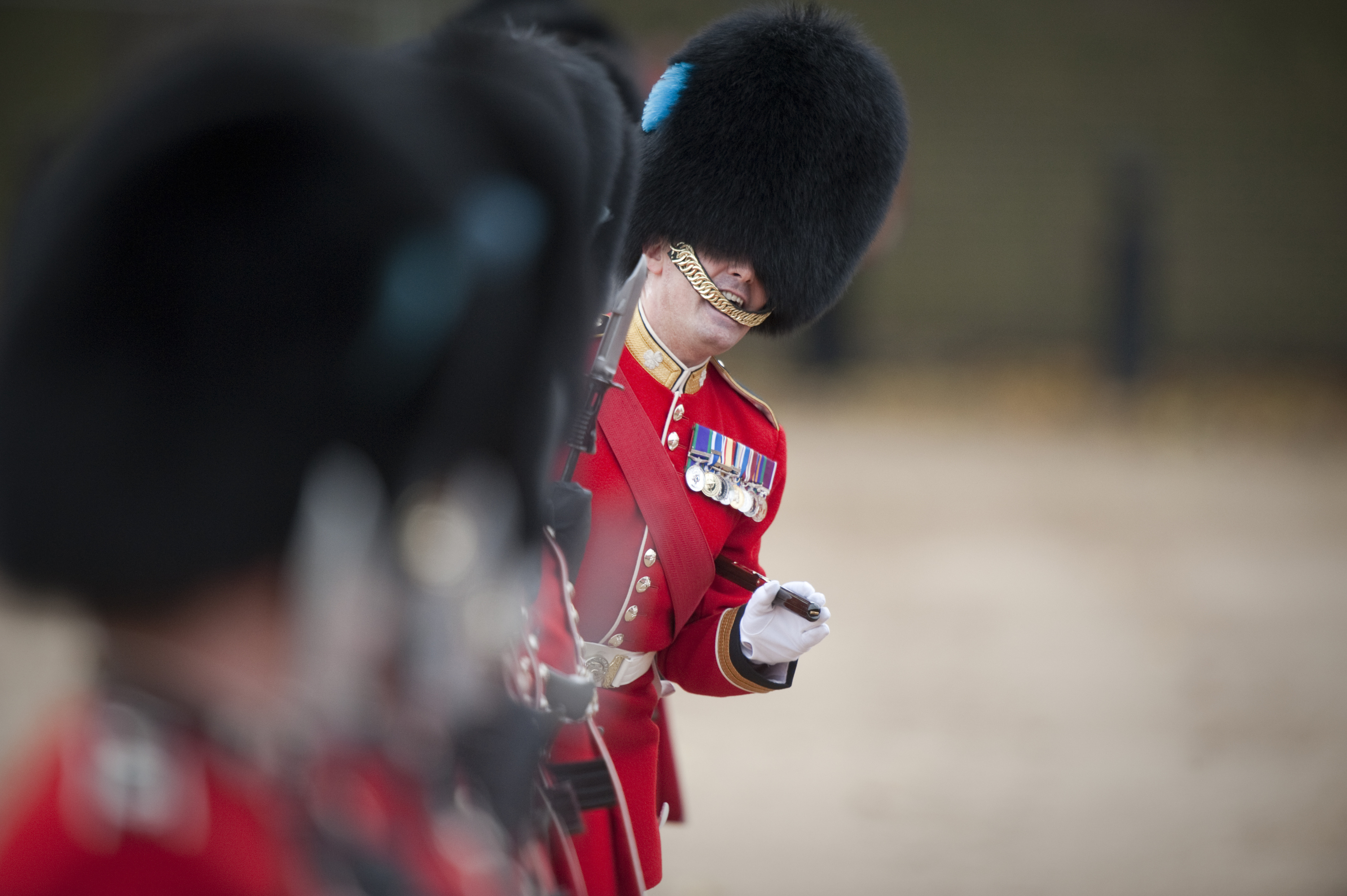
1st Battalion Irish Guards are pictured lining up on parade during a state visit by the President of Indonesia, Susilo Bambang Yudhoyono (2012)

Like the other Foot Guards regiments, the "Home Service Dress" of the Irish Guards is a scarlet tunic and bearskin. Buttons are worn in fours, reflecting the regiment's position as the fourth most senior Guards regiment, and the collar is adorned with embroided shamrock. They also sport a St. Patrick's blue hackle (plume) on the right side of the bearskin. A plume of St Patrick's blue was selected because blue is the colour of the mantle and sash of the Order of St Patrick, a chivalric order, founded by George III of the United Kingdom for the Kingdom of Ireland in February 1783 from which the regiment also draws its cap star and motto. The Irish Guards pipers wear saffron kilts, green hose with saffron flashes and heavy black shoes known as brogues with no spats, a rifle green doublet with buttons in fours and a hat known as a caubeen.The regimental capstar is worn over the piper's right eye and is topped by a blue hackle. A green cloak with four silver buttons is worn over the shoulders and is secured by two green straps that cross over the chest.

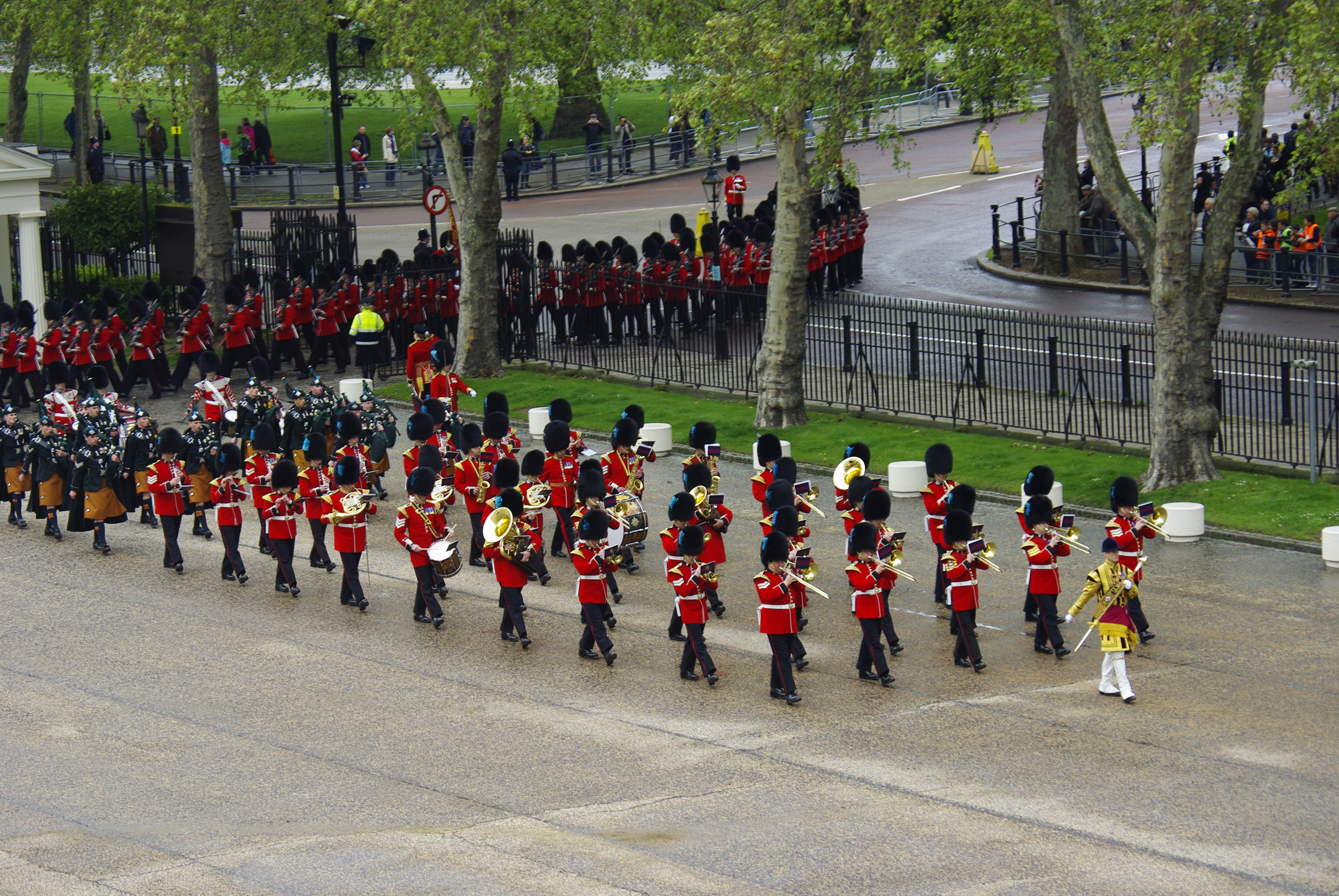
Band of the Irish Guards marching into Wellington Barracks following the Queen's Birthday Parade (2012)

In "Walking-out Dress", the Irish Guards can be identified by the green band on their forage caps. Officers also traditionally carry a blackthorn cane.

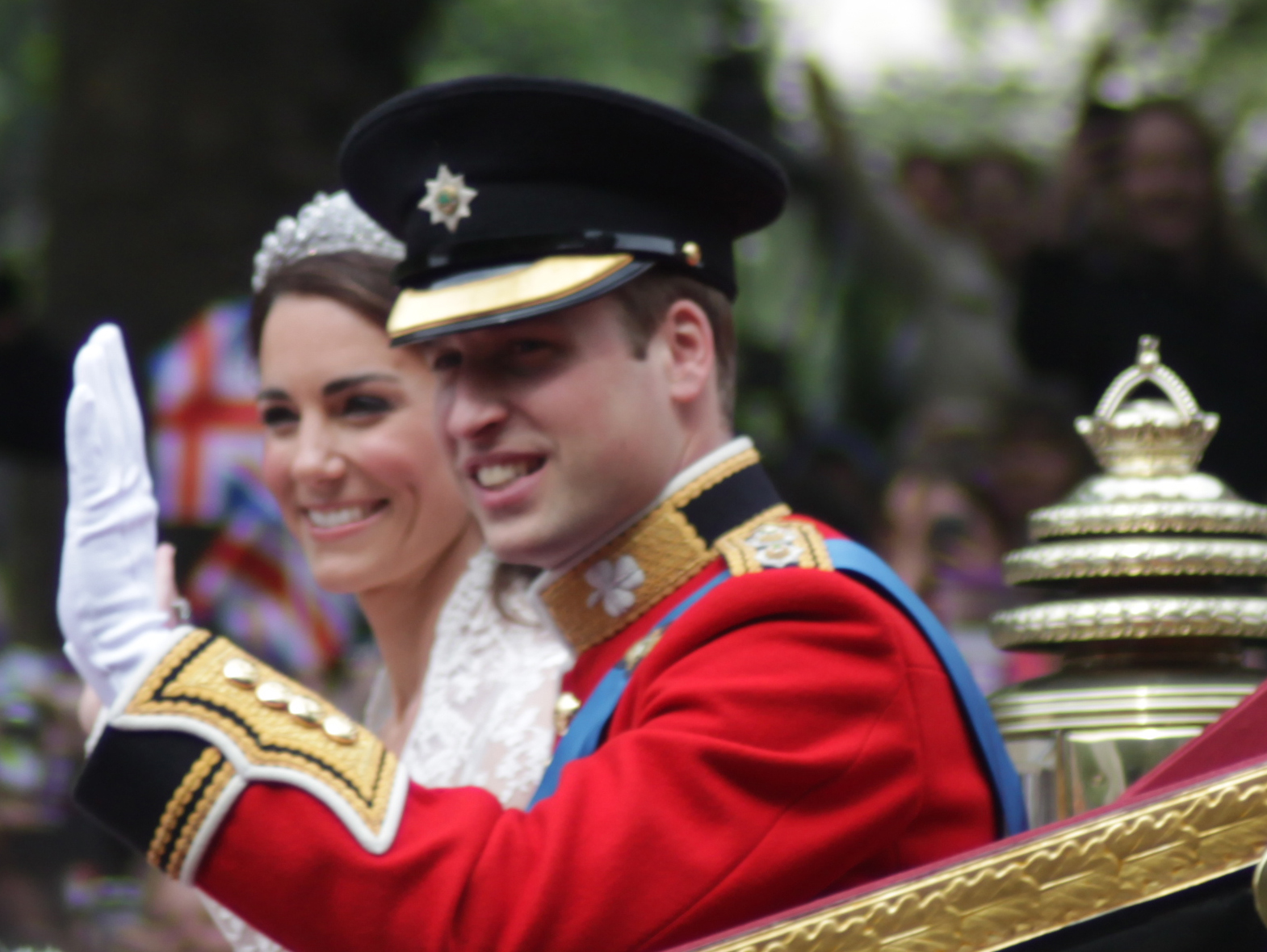
Prince William wearing an Irish Guards Tunic and Forage Cap at his wedding to Catherine Middleton (2011)

Like the other Guards regiments, they wear a khaki beret with the blue/red/blue Household Division backing patch on it. On the beret, ranks from Guardsman to Lance Sergeant wear a brass or staybrite cap badge, Sergeants and Colour Sergeants wear a bi-metal cap badge, Warrant Officers wear a silver plate gilt and enamel cap badge and commissioned officers of the regiment wear an embroidered cap badge.

Prince William, who was then Colonel of the Irish Guards, wore the uniform of the Irish Guards at his wedding to Catherine Middleton.

== Motto ==
The regiment takes its motto, Quis Separabit?, or "Who shall separate us?", from the Order of St Patrick.

== Nickname ==
The Irish Guards are known throughout the British Army as "the Micks" or "Fighting Micks." The term "Mick" is an offensive term for an Irish person; however it is proudly used internally within the regiment.

== Training ==
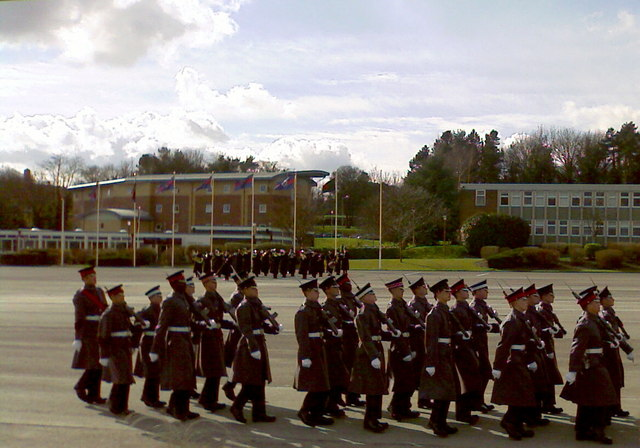
Recruits practicing drill on Catterick parade square (2009)

Recruits to the Guards Division go through a thirty-week training programme at the Infantry Training Centre (ITC). The training is two weeks more than the training for the Regular infantry regiments of the British Army; the extra training, carried out throughout the course, is devoted to drill and ceremonies.

== Mascot ==
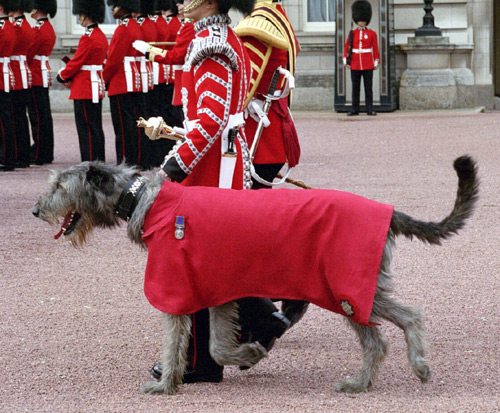
Mascot Irish Wolfhound (2004)

Since 1902, an Irish Wolfhound has been presented as a mascot to the regiment by the Irish Wolfhound Club, who originally hoped the publicity would increase the breed's popularity with the public. The first mascot was called Brian Boru.

In 1961, the wolfhound was admitted to the select club of official Army mascots, entitling him to the services of the Royal Army Veterinary Corps, as well as quartering and food at public expense. Originally, the mascot was in the care of a drummer boy, but is now looked after by one of the regiment's drummers and his family. The Irish Guards are the only Guards regiment permitted to have their mascot lead them on parade. During Trooping the Colour, the mascot marches only from Wellington Barracks as far as Horse Guards Parade. He then falls out of the formation and does not participate in the Trooping itself. Domhnall, the regiment's seventeenth mascot, retired back to Ireland, in 2019.

== Traditions and affiliations ==
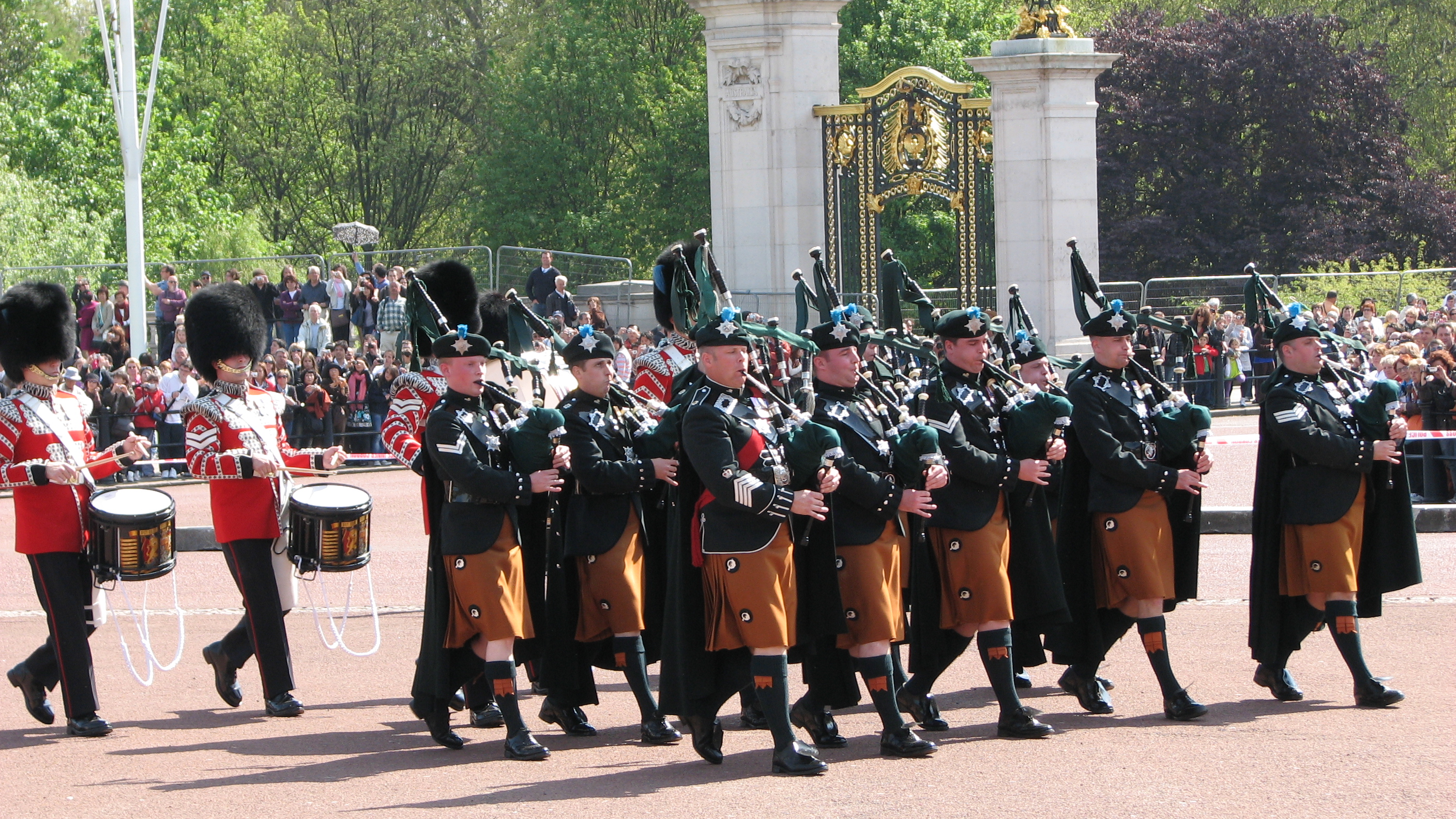
The Drums & Pipes (2017)

St Patrick's Day is the traditional regimental celebration. It is customary for the regiment to begin the day's celebrations with the Guardsmen being woken by their officers and served gunfire. Fresh shamrock is then presented to members of the regiment, whether they are in the UK or abroad on operations.

Except in wartime, the presentation of shamrock is traditionally made by a member of the royal family. This task was first performed in 1901 by Queen Alexandra and later by Queen Elizabeth The Queen Mother. After the latter's death, the presentation was made by Anne, Princess Royal. Starting in 2012, the presentation has been made by Catherine, Princess of Wales.

In 1950 George VI marked the fiftieth anniversary of the formation of the Irish Guards by presenting the shamrocks on St Patrick's Day. This honour was mirrored by King George's surviving wife, Queen Elizabeth The Queen Mother, fifty years later when she presented shamrocks to the regiment on St. Patrick's Day in their centenary year of 2000.

== Battle honours ==
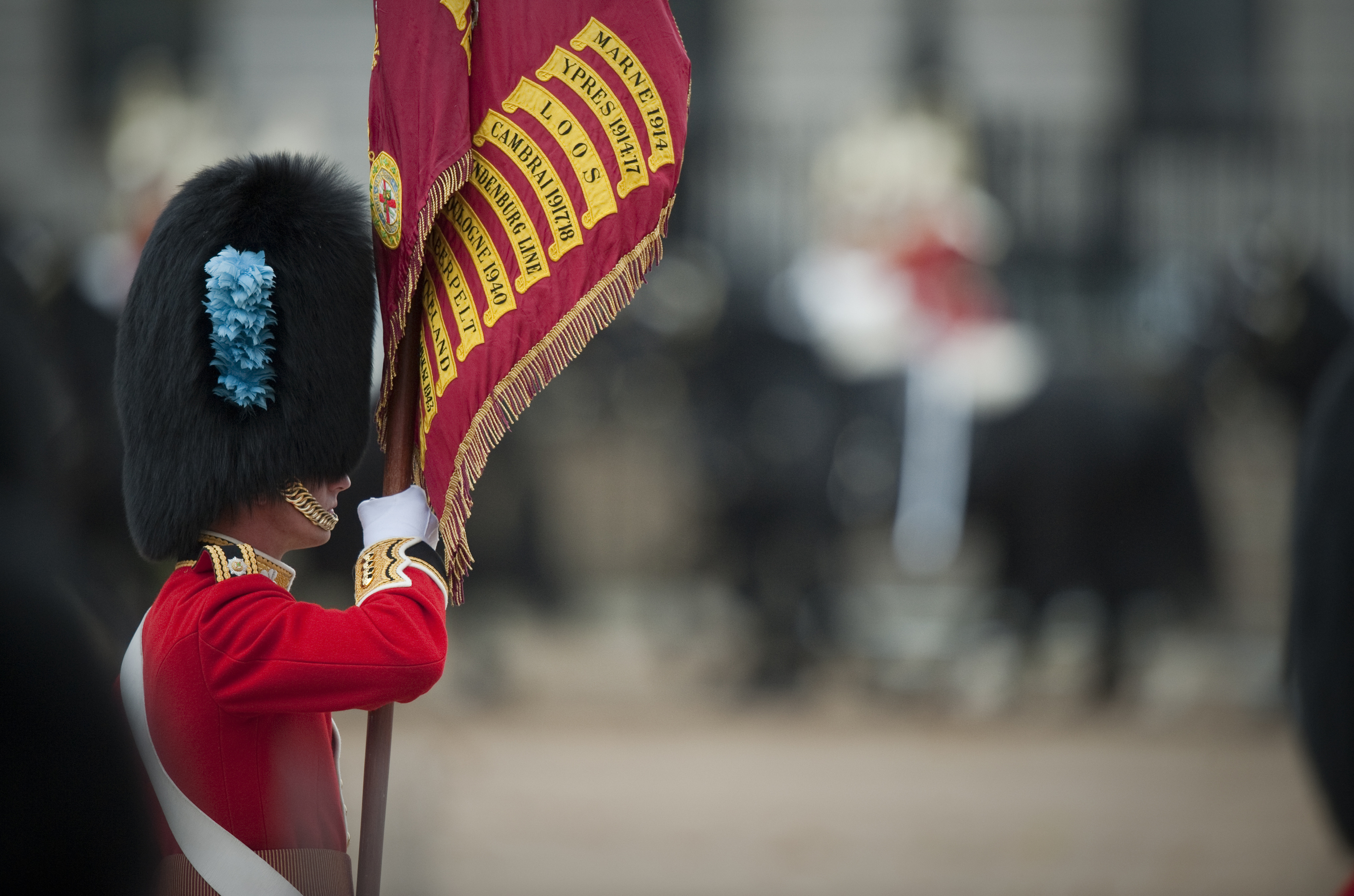
The Queen's Colour of the 1st Battalion Irish Guards, displaying some of the Regiment's battle honours (2012)

The regiment's battle honours are as follows:

- First World War: Mons, Retreat from Mons, Marne 1914, Aisne 1914, Ypres 1914 and 17, Langemarck 1914, Battle of Gheluvelt, Nonne Bosschen, Festubert 1915, Loos, Somme 1916 and 1918, Flers–Courcelette, Morval, Pilckem, Poelcapelle, Passchendaele, Cambrai 1917 and 1918, St. Quentin, Lys, Hazebrouck, Albert 1918, Bapaume 1918, Arras 1918, Scarpe 1918, Drocourt-Quéant, Hindenburg Line, Canal du Nord, Selle, Sambre, France and Flanders 1914–18
- Second World War:
  - North-West Europe: Pothus, Norway 1940, Boulogne 1940, Cagny, Mont Pincon, Neerpelt, Nijmegen, Aam, Rhineland, Hochwald, Rhine, Bentheim, North-West Europe 1940 1944–45,
  - North Africa: Medjez Plain, Djebel bou Aoukaz, North Africa 1943,
  - Italy: Anzio, Aprilia, Carroceto, Italy 1943–44
- Al Basrah 2003, Iraq 2003

== Victoria Cross recipients ==
- Guardsman Edward Colquhoun Charlton, 2nd Battalion, The Irish Guards
- Lance Corporal John Kenneally, 1st Battalion, The Irish Guards
- Acting Lieutenant Colonel James Marshall, Irish Guards (attached to the 16th Battalion, The Lancashire Fusiliers)
- Lance Sergeant John Moyney, 2nd Battalion, The Irish Guards
- Lance Corporal Michael O'Leary, 1st Battalion, The Irish Guards
- Guardsman Thomas Woodcock, 2nd Battalion, The Irish Guards

== Notable members ==
- Field Marshal Harold Alexander, 1st Earl Alexander of Tunis
- Francis Browne
- General Sir Mark Carleton-Smith
- James Chichester-Clark
- Jean, Grand Duke of Luxembourg
- Arthur Charles Evans
- Sir John Gorman
- Lieutenant John Kipling
- Sir Patrick Leigh Fermor
- Nigel Morgan
- Lieutenant Colonel George Henry Morris
- Liam O'Flaherty
- Brigadier Joe Vandeleur
- Lieutenant Colonel Giles Vandeleur

== Colonels-in-Chief ==
King Edward VII assumed the colonelcy-in-chief of the regiment on his accession, and subsequent monarchs have also been colonel-in-chief.

- 1901–1910: King Edward VII
- 1915–1936: King George V
- Jan 1936–Dec 1936: King Edward VIII
- 1936–1952: King George VI
- 1952–2022: Queen Elizabeth II
- 2022–present: King Charles III

== Regimental Colonels ==
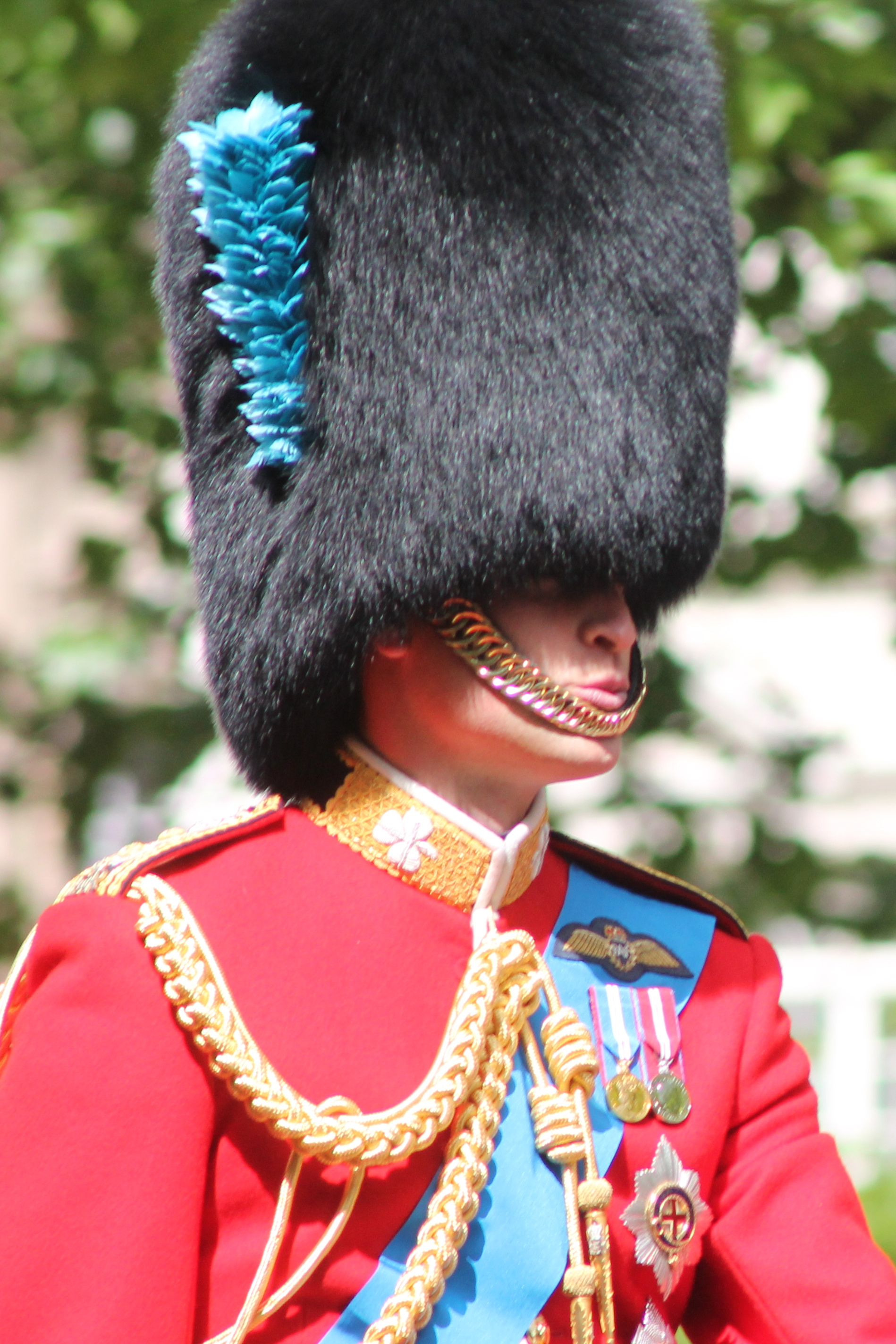
The then Duke of Cambridge at Queen Elizabeth II's Birthday Parade, June 2013

The following is a list of individuals who have served in the role of colonel of the regiment:

- 1900–1914: Field Marshal Frederick Roberts, 1st Earl Roberts
- 1914–1916: Field Marshal Herbert Kitchener, 1st Earl Kitchener
- 1916–1925: Field Marshal John French, 1st Earl of Ypres
- 1925–1946: Field Marshal Rudolph Lambart, 10th Earl of Cavan
- 1946–1969: Field Marshal Harold Alexander, 1st Earl Alexander of Tunis
- 1969–1984: General Sir Basil Eugster
- 1984–2000: General Jean, Grand Duke of Luxembourg
- 2000–2008: Lieutenant James Hamilton, 5th Duke of Abercorn
- 2008–2011: Major General Sir Sebastian Roberts
- 2011–2022: Lieutenant Colonel William, Prince of Wales
- 2022–present: Catherine, Princess of Wales

== Regimental Lieutenant Colonels ==
The Regimental Lieutenant Colonels have included:

- 1900–1905: Col. Vesey John Dawson
- 1905–1909: Col. Richard J. Cooper
- 1909–1913: Col. George Colborne Nugent
- 1913–1914: Col. Charles FitzClarence
- 1914–1917: Col. Douglas J. Proby
- 1917–1918: Col. Lord Ardee
- 1918–1919: Col. Sir John R. Hall, 9th Baronet
- 1919–1924: Col. Robert C. A. McCalmont
- 1924–1928: Col. William H. V. Darell
- 1928–1930: Col. The Hon. Harold R. L. G. Alexander
- 1930–1931: Col. Robert V. Pollok
- 1931–1935: Col. L. M. Gregson
- 1935–1936: Col. A. G. C. Dawnay
- 1936–1938: Col. J. S. N. Fitzgerald
- 1938–1939: Col. R. Bruce S. Reford
- 1939–?: Col. The Hon. T. E. Vesey
- 1959–1961: Col. Henry L. S. Young
- 1961–1964: Col. James W. Berridge
- 1964–1966: Col. Michael J. P. O'Cock
- 1966–1969: Col. Charles W. D. Harvey-Kelly
- 1969–1972: Col. J. Anthony Aylmer
- 1972–1973: Col. John G. F. Head
- 1973–1976: Col. Prince John N. Ghika
- 1976–1979: Col. Giles A. Allan
- 1979–1981: Col. Richard T. P. Hume
- 1981–1985: Col. James H. Baker
- 1985–1988: Col. Sir William W. Mahon, 7th Baronet
- 1988–1991: Brig. Robert J. S. Corbett
- 1991–1995: Brig. David B. W. Webb-Carter
- 1995–1999: Brig. R. Christopher Wolverson
- 1999–2008: Maj.-Gen. Sir Sebastian J. L. Roberts
- 2008–2012: Maj.-Gen. Sir William G. Cubitt
- 2012–2022: Gen. Sir Mark A. P. Carleton-Smith
- 2022–present: Maj.-Gen. Sir Christopher J. Ghika

== Commanding Officers ==
Commanding Officers have included (since 2001):

- 2001–2003: Lt.-Col. James R. H. Stopford
- 2003–2006: Lt.-Col. Charles P. H. Knaggs
- 2006–2008: Lt.-Col. Michael G. C. O'Dwyer
- 2008–2010: Lt.-Col. Benjamin C. Farrell
- 2010–2012: Lt.-Col. Christopher J. Ghika
- 2012–2014: Lt.-Col. Edward T. Boanas
- 2014–2017: Lt.-Col. I. Alexander J. Turner
- 2017–2019: Lt.-Col. Jonathan A. E. Palmer
- 2019–2022: Lt.-Col. Robert P. Money
- 2022–2024: Lt.-Col. James Aldridge
- 2024–present: Lt.-Col. Benjamin J. Irwin-Clark

== Order of precedence ==
Preceded by Scots Guards	Infantry Order of Precedence	Succeeded by Welsh Guards

== Alliances ==
- Australia – 4th Battalion, Royal Australian Regiment
- Montserrat – Royal Montserrat Defence Force
- France – 13^{e} Demi-Brigade de Légion Étrangère (Bond of Friendship)

The Irish Guards and other Guards regiments have a long-standing connection to The Parachute Regiment. Irish Guardsmen who have completed P Company can be seconded to the Guards Parachute Platoon, which is currently attached to the 3rd Battalion, The Parachute Regiment. The Guards Parachute Platoon maintains the tradition established by Number 1 (Guards) Independent Parachute Company that was part of the original Pathfinder Group of 16th Parachute Brigade, which has since been designated as the 16th Air Assault Brigade.
