= Marcus O'Lone =

British land agent (born 1953)

Sir Marcus James O'Lone, KCVO, FRICS (born 1953) is a retired British land agent.

Born in Belfast, O'Lone was the son of a colonel. He was educated at the Royal Agricultural College. In 1977, he became agent to the Marquess of Salisbury, working for him until joining the Royal Household as Deputy Ranger of Windsor Great Park in 1995. Three years later, he became Land Agent to Queen at Sandringham, serving until 2018 when he retired. O'Lone and Sandringham's head keeper David Clark received the Game and Wildlife Conservation Trust's Mills & Reeve Grey Partridge Award in 2018 for their efforts to conserve the grey partridge on the Sandringham Estate.

O'Lone was appointed a Lieutenant of the Royal Victorian Order in 2003 and promoted to Commander ten years later. On retirement, he was promoted to Knight Commander. He is also a fellow of the Royal Institute of Chartered Surveyors and the Association of Agricultural Valuers.
