= Diamond Jubilee Pageant =

2012 equine event at Windsor Castle, UK

- Venue: Windsor Castle
- Type: Equine pageant
- Theme: Diamond Jubilee of Elizabeth II

The Diamond Jubilee Pageant, also branded The World Comes to Windsor, held between 10 and 13 May 2012 was an equine pageant held in the grounds of Windsor Castle, organised as part of the Queen Elizabeth II's Diamond Jubilee celebrations.

== Date and location ==
The pageant was to be the first major event of the Diamond Jubilee celebrations for Queen Elizabeth II taking place in 2012. It was to act as a curtain raiser for a programme of Spring and Summer celebrations in the UK which will culminate in an extended bank holiday weekend in June.

The pageant was a four-day event held in a 3,000-seat arena the grounds of Windsor Castle in Berkshire, England, taking place on the 10th, 11th, 12th and 13 May 2012. The Queen attended the show on the final day. The pageant was to be combined with the annual Royal Windsor Horse Show, with the horse show events occurring during the day, and the pageant shows being held in the evening.

== Programme ==
=== Theme and hosts ===
The theme of the pageant is a combination of the Queen's passion for horses, and her state visits to more than 250 countries, many of which have featured horses. The arena set will feature images of Buckingham Palace in central London. The show will feature military and equestrian displays of riding, as well as dancing and music, over a 90-minute-long programme. The performance is to be hosted by Alan Titchmarsh, with Helen Mirren, Martin Clunes, Sanjeev Bhaskar and Omid Djalili introducing the various acts on stage.

=== Performers ===
The show was initially described as including 500 horses and 800 performers, and later rose to 550 horses and 1,100 performers For the equine pieces, the horses were to be drawn from every continent except Africa, which due to quarantine regulations, would instead be represented by zebras and cattle.

The Mounted Band of the Household Cavalry Regiment and the King's Troop, Royal Horse Artillery will open the show. Other acts announced include:

Lineup is in alphabetical, not running order

- Abigail Washburn, a Nashville singer and banjo player
- Cook Island dancers
- Cossacks from Russia
- Cowboys from Oklahoma
- David Garrett, a US classical violinist
- Dhol drummers and dancers
- Huasos from Chile
- Il Divo, a vocal quartet
- Inuit from Canada
- The Italian Carabinieri Mounted 4th Regiment
- Mexican singers and dancers
- The Nairobi Chamber Chorus
- New South Wales Mounted Police and Aborigines
- Omani Mounted Activity Ride
- The President's Bodyguard of India
- Raghu Dixit, an Indian folk singer
- Rolf Harris
- The Royal Canadian Mounted Police (The Musical Ride)
- South African performers from The Lion King musical
- Susan Boyle
- The Ugandan Watoto Children's Choir

== Organisation and ticketing ==
Organisation for the pageant had begun in mid-2010. Simon Brooks Ward was the pageant's director and producer. Alan Titchmarsh and Angela Rippon are ambassadors for the pageant. The pageant was privately funded, with surplus monies raised being donated to charity. Tickets for the shows went on sale in November 2011. The event was expected to attract 12,000 spectators.

== Broadcasting ==
The pageant was broadcast on ITV1 at 18:30 on Sunday 3 June 2012, as a 2-hour programme with the title All the Queen's Horses.

== See also ==
- A Gallop Through History, similar 2022 pageant
