= Sebastian Roberts =

British Army general (1954–2023)

Major General Sir Sebastian Roberts KCVO OBE
- Born: 7 January 1954
- Died: 9 March 2023 (aged 69)
- Military career
- Allegiance: United Kingdom
- Branch: British Army
- Service years: 1977–2010
- Rank: Major General
- Service number: 502909
- Unit: Irish Guards
- Commands: London District; Household Division; 1st Battalion Irish Guards
- Conflicts: Operation Banner
- Awards: Knight Commander of the Royal Victorian Order; Officer of the Order of the British Empire

Major General Sir Sebastian John Lechmere Roberts, KCVO, OBE (7 January 1954 – 9 March 2023) was a senior British Army officer who served as the Senior Army Representative at the Royal College of Defence Studies.

== Military career ==
Educated at St Philip's School, Ampleforth College and Balliol College, Oxford, Roberts was commissioned into the Irish Guards in 1977. Roberts went on serve as commanding officer of the 1st Battalion of the Irish Guards in London and Northern Ireland. He was appointed Major-General commanding the Household Division and General Officer Commanding London District in 2003. He became the Senior Army Representative at the Royal College of Defence Studies in 2007, and retired in 2010.

Roberts also served as Colonel of the Irish Guards from 2008 to 2011, being succeeded by Prince William on 10 February 2011.

Roberts was the author of Soldiering: The Military Covenant (1998).

== Personal life and death ==
Roberts was married to Elizabeth. He died on 9 March 2023, at the age of 69. He was survived by four children.

Military offices
Preceded by Sir Redmond Watt	GOC London District; 2003–2007	Succeeded by Sir William Cubitt
Honorary titles
Preceded by The Duke of Abercorn	Colonel of the Irish Guards; 2008–2011	Succeeded by HRH The Duke of Cambridge
