= John Spurling (businessman) =

Sir John Spurling KCVO, OBE
- Born: 1939 (age 86–87); London, United Kingdom
- Education: St John's College, Oxford
- Occupation: Businessman
- Known for: Founder of Pet Protect and former CEO of Kenyan company Advertising Associates
- Spouse: Gwyneth Spurling (m. 1989)
- Children: 0
- Awards: Knight Commander of the Royal Victorian Order (KVCO)

Sir John Damian Spurling, KCVO, OBE (born 1939) is a British businessman, who worked in advertising and is best known as founder of Pet Protect, a pet insurance company.

== Early life ==
Born in London in 1939, Spurling was educated in Johannesburg and London.

== Career ==
He worked in advertising for the Eldorado Ice Cream Company, then became advertising manager to Dorlands and Allandyce Palmber before becoming a director of Kenya Advertising Corp. in 1963. Between 1970 and 1982, he was then chairman and chief executive of the Kenyan company Advertising Associates, which was acquired by McCann-Erikson in 1979.

He then moved into pet insurance, taking over a small agency, Pet Protect, in 1984; he grew it substantially and completed a deal with the UK Kennel Club so that the Club would receive a percentage of each policy in return for officially endorsing Pet Protect. According to The Telegraph, he sold Pet Protect to GE Investments in 1997, although other sources state it was GE Capital. Spurling's Who's Who entry states he remained with Pet Protect until 2001. GE moved away from the Kennel Club relationship aspect of Pet Protect's business model, and the Kennel Club invited Spurling to launch a new insurance company. In 2002, he founded PetPartners Ltd, of which he was chairman and chief executive until 2009. Spurling also launched PetPartners Inc. for the US market and has been its chairman since 2004.

== Charitable work ==
Outside of his corporate endeavours, Spurling has been involved with charitable pursuits, such as the Animal Health Trust. He has been chairman of London Marathon since 2008 and Vice-President of the Kennel Club since 2011.

== Recognition ==
He was appointed an Officer of the Order of the British Empire in the 2000 New Year Honours "for charitable services". He was also appointed a Knight Commander of the Royal Victorian Order in the 2012 Diamond Jubilee Honours "for services to charity".
