= William Cubitt (British Army officer) =

British Army general

Major General Sir William Cubitt KCVO CBE DL
- Born: 1959 (age 66–67); Kensington, London
- Military career
- Allegiance: United Kingdom
- Branch: British Army
- Service years: 1977–2011
- Rank: Major General
- Commands: London District; Household Division
- Conflicts: Kosovo War; Operation Banner
- Awards: Knight Commander of the Royal Victorian Order; Commander of the Order of the British Empire

Major General Sir William George Cubitt, KCVO, CBE, DL (born 19 February 1959) is a former senior British Army officer who served as General Officer Commanding London District and Major-General commanding the Household Division from 2007 until his retirement in 2011.

== Early life ==
The second of the three sons of Thomas Randall Cubitt and his wife Rachel Edith Capron, daughter of Lt.-Colonel G. T. H. Capron, Cubitt was educated at Beechwood Park, Hertfordshire, Stowe School, and the University of Edinburgh, where he graduated BSc in Agriculture.

He is a member of a Norfolk landed gentry family, of Honing Hall, which was inherited by his father. The Cubitts are descended from Captain Thomas Cubitt of Honing (1760–1829).

== Career ==
Cubitt was commissioned into the Coldstream Guards in 1977. He transferred to the Irish Guards in 1998. In 1999 he served in the Former Republic of Yugoslavia and was appointed an Officer of the Order of the British Empire for his services during the Kosovo War. In 2004 he served in Northern Ireland and was advanced to Commander of the Order of the British Empire for his services in the final stages of Operation Banner.

Cubitt was promoted to major general and appointed Major-General commanding the Household Division and General Officer Commanding London District in 2007. He relinquished this appointment on 29 June 2011 and was invested as a Knight Commander of the Royal Victorian Order.

Cubitt was appointed High Sheriff of Norfolk for 2016–2017, and in 2018 Sir Richard Jewson, Lord Lieutenant of Norfolk, made him one of his Deputy Lieutenants.

He is a farmer and landowner.

== Family ==
In 1990, Cubitt married Lucy Jane Pym, daughter of a fellow Irish Guards officer, Martin Hugh Pym, and a granddaughter of Alexander Ruthven Pym; they have a daughter, Charlotte Mary Cubitt, and two sons, James William Cubitt and Edward George Cubitt.

== Honours ==
- 2000: Officer of the Order of the British Empire
- 2005: Commander of the Order of the British Empire
- 2008: Regimental Lieutenant Colonel of the Irish Guards (an honorary position), succeeding Major-General Sir Sebastian Roberts
- 2011: Knight Commander of the Royal Victorian Order

Military offices
Preceded by Sir Sebastian Roberts	GOC London District; 2007–2011	Succeeded by George Norton
