= Robert Ross (courtier) =

Scottish surveyor and courtier (born 1950)

Sir Walter Robert "Bertie" Alexander Ross, KCVO, FRICS (born 27 February 1950) is a Scottish surveyor and courtier.

Born in 1950, he is the son of Colonel Walter John Macdonald Ross, who served as Lord Lieutenant of Kirkcudbright from 1977 to 1982; his older brother was Lieutenant-Colonel Sir Malcolm Ross, Comptroller of the Lord Chamberlain's Office from 1991 to 2006 and Lord Lieutenant of Kirkpatrick from 2006 to 2018.

Ross was educated at Eton College and the Royal Agricultural College. After spending a year as a surveyor for Buccleuch Estates, he joined Savills in 1973. He became a partner in 1982 and a director four years later. In 1996, he joined the Council of the Duchy of Cornwall. The following year, he left Savills and was appointed Secretary and Keeper of the Records of the Duchy of Cornwall. He retired in 2013, and returned to Savills as a consultant.

In 2011, The Guardian described the Duchy as "a target-oriented investment portfolio, headed by the prince with a £200,000-a-year chief executive, Bertie Ross, who oversees the equivalent of 91 full-time staff." In 2005, Ross was pressed by MPs on the House of Commons Public Accounts Committee, who argued that the Duchy's accounts should be publicly available; he rebuffed these calls, stating that "The Duchy of Cornwall income is private to the Prince of Wales. Any business or estate that's private should be able to choose its own audit." Other MPs on the committee argued that the £11.9 million the prince was then earning annually through the duchy was "excessive"; after Ross stated that the Prince used this to fund his staff and duties, Gerry Steinberg said that "This looks very much like jiggery-pokery", a statement which made headlines. Ross denied any wrong-doing.

Ross was appointed a Commander of the Royal Victorian Order in the 2006 New Year Honours, and was promoted to Knight Commander in the 2012 New Year Honours.
