= Order of Saint John (chartered 1888) in the United States =

Priory in the United States of America of the Most Venerable Order of the Hospital of Saint John of Jerusalem
- Priory coat of arms
- Formation: 1996
- Type: Charitable organization
- Headquarters: 1850 M Street; Washington, DC 20036
- Location: United States of America
- Members: 1,206
- Prior: Nigel Heath, KStJ
- Key people: Ellen Metzger LeCompte, CStJ (Chancellor); Michele Blair, MStJ (Executive Director)
- Affiliations: Order of St. John
- Website: http://www.saintjohn.org/

The Priory in the United States of America is one of the establishments of the Most Venerable Order of the Hospital of Saint John of Jerusalem. It is one of eleven international priories and the representative of the Order in the United States of America. The main purpose of the Priory is to provide for the financial support of the St John of Jerusalem Eye Hospital Group. It also contributes to other projects of the Order of St John around the world, responds to special appeals for disaster relief, and maintains a volunteer service corps that serves veterans in the United States Department of Veterans Affairs.

== History ==
The predecessor of the Most Venerable Order of the Hospital of Saint John of Jerusalem has long been in the United States of America. In the 1870s, Bishop Charles Todd Quintard of Tennessee had been made a Chaplain of what was then called the Order of Saint John of Jerusalem in England. The number of members of the Order in the United States remained small even after a Royal Charter was granted by Queen Victoria in 1888. Only in the 1950s did some prominent individuals in the area of New York City begin to get involved with the Order's work. Before 1960, the membership included Fanny Hanna Moore, Douglas Fairbanks, Jr, Edward Nason West, and Grayson L. Kirk. As more people became involved in the Order, a need was felt for some organization to help in the coordination of fundraising and service efforts. Because the United States of America was a republic with no formal connection to the United Kingdom or the Commonwealth, an alternative to the traditional Priories and Commanderies was devised. In 1957, the American Society of the Order was formally incorporated in the state of New York with Fairbanks and others acting as the founders. This allowed the American contingent of Order members to more effectively raise funds for the Eye Hospital in Jerusalem and the Order's work around the world.

As the Order's presence in the United States grew, it expanded beyond its traditional base around New York City. Groups of members began to develop around St. Louis, San Francisco, and Washington, D.C., among other areas. The geographic area of the Order in the United States became more extensive, and the membership became more diverse. By the early 1990s, the arrangement whereby the Order was represented in the United States solely by a corporate entity in New York became untenable. On May 11, 1996, the Priory in the USA was formally established at a ceremony National Cathedral in Washington attended by HRH Prince Richard, Duke of Gloucester. When the Priory was established, some members of the Order from existing Priories expressed concern that those appointed in the new Priory would be buying honors since there was no St. John Ambulance in which service could be recognized. Since its establishment, the Priory in the USA has "raised millions of dollars over the years to support the work of St John of Jerusalem Eye Hospital, its hospital in Hebron, satellite eye clinics in Gaza and the West Bank, and mobile outreach, training, teaching and research programs."

== Structure ==
=== National organization ===
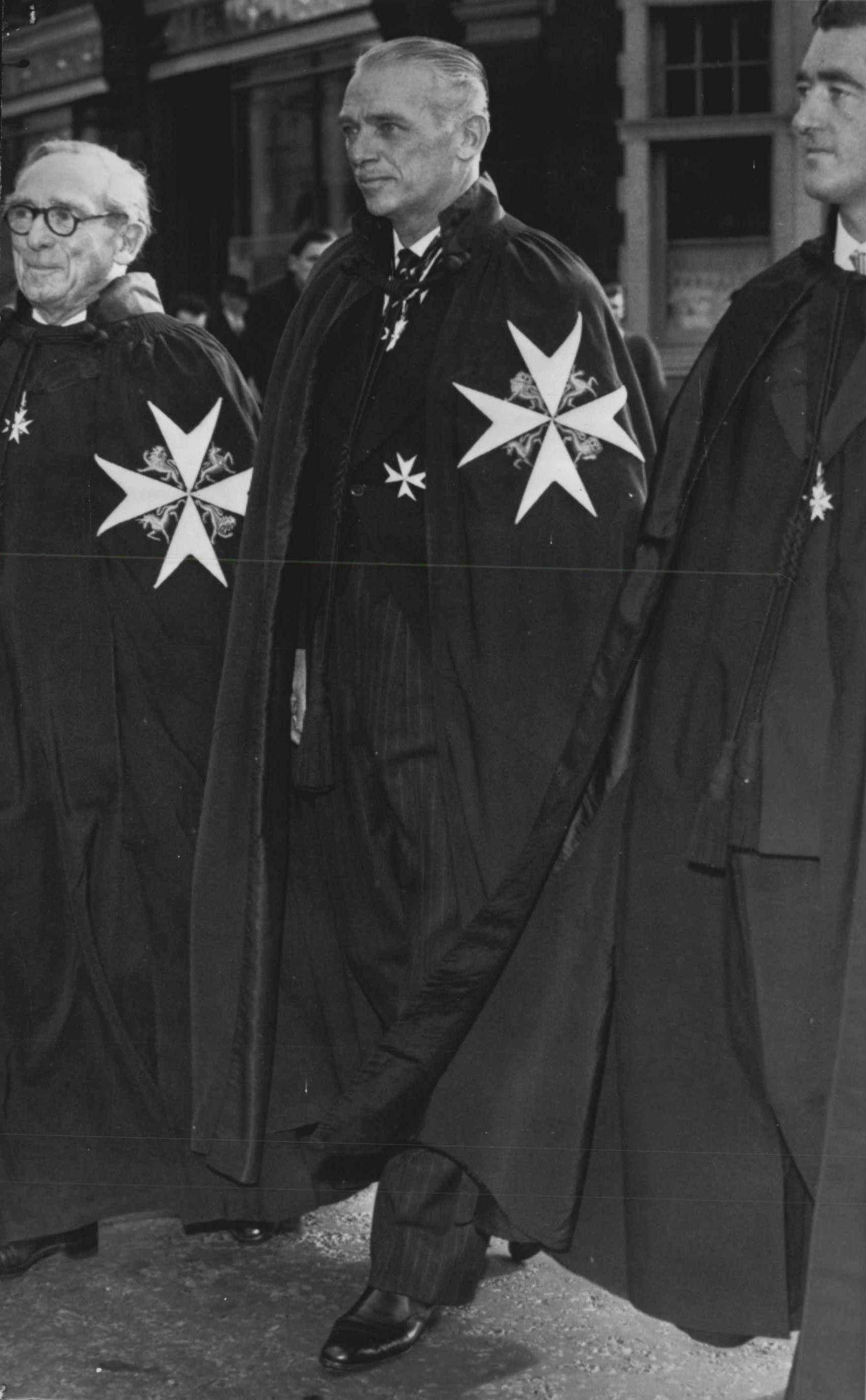
Douglas Fairbanks, Jr. was invested as an associate knight of the Order of St John in 1950. He is shown here attending a service of rededication at the Priory Church at Clerkenwell in 1958.

As one of eleven Priories of the Most Venerable Order of the Hospital of Saint John of Jerusalem, the Priory in the United States of America is led by a Prior and a Chapter. The Priory has had four Priors since it was established in 1996:

- John R. Drexel IV, GCStJ (1996–2008)
- A. Marshall Acuff, GCStJ (2008–2014)
- Palmer C. Hamilton, KStJ (2014–2020)
- Nigel Heath, KStJ (2020–present)

From the foundation of the Priory until 2012, the American Society and the Priory in the USA worked concurrently to fulfill the Order's mission in the country. The American Society was dissolved on June 26, 2012, and its functions were absorbed into the Priory. The Chapter of the Priory comprises 20 members of the Order from across the United States who serve staggered three-year terms. There are also several national officers of the Priory including the chancellor, four vice-chancellors, a sub-prelate, a treasurer, a secretary, a hospitaller, a historiographer, and a genealogist. These are appointed to three-year terms as well. The Priory also employs an executive director, who is not required to be a member of the Order, to "handle day-to-day operations, focusing on membership communications and fundraising within and outside the Order."

=== Regional organization ===
The regional administration of the Priory is divided into thirteen geographic areas. As of 2014, these regions were Atlanta, Charleston, Connecticut, the Gulf Coast, the Mountain States, New York, Palm Beach, Richmond, San Diego, San Francisco, Southwest, St. Louis, and Washington, DC. Each region is headed by a regional chair and a committee that plans and organizes fundraising events. The annual service of investiture and rededication also rotates through these cities each year.

== Service ==
Unlike many other Priories and Associations of the Most Venerable Order of the Hospital of Saint John of Jerusalem, the Priory in the United States of America does not manage an ambulance service for first aid training and first aid cover. The primary mission of the Priory has always been to raise funds for the Order's Eye Hospital in Jerusalem. This was its primary purpose in its days as the American Society. The donations provided by the Priory in the United States comprise a large portion of the Eye Hospital's budget. In 2014—the most recent year for which data are available—the Priory donated $1,515,562 to the hospital's work.

Since 2013, the Priory in the United States has overseen the St. John Volunteer Corps (SJVC). It was formally launched at the Priory's annual meeting in January. Because the Priory has never been involved with the St. John Ambulance, confrères in the United States had never had coordinated hands-on service opportunities in which to be involved. They were not able to support the work of the Order beyond making annual oblations to Eye Hospital. The SJVC's stated goal is to give "provide members and potential members [of the Priory] with the opportunity to engage in a variety of volunteer service activities in Veterans Administration Facilities throughout the United States."

== Cooperation with the Order of St John ==
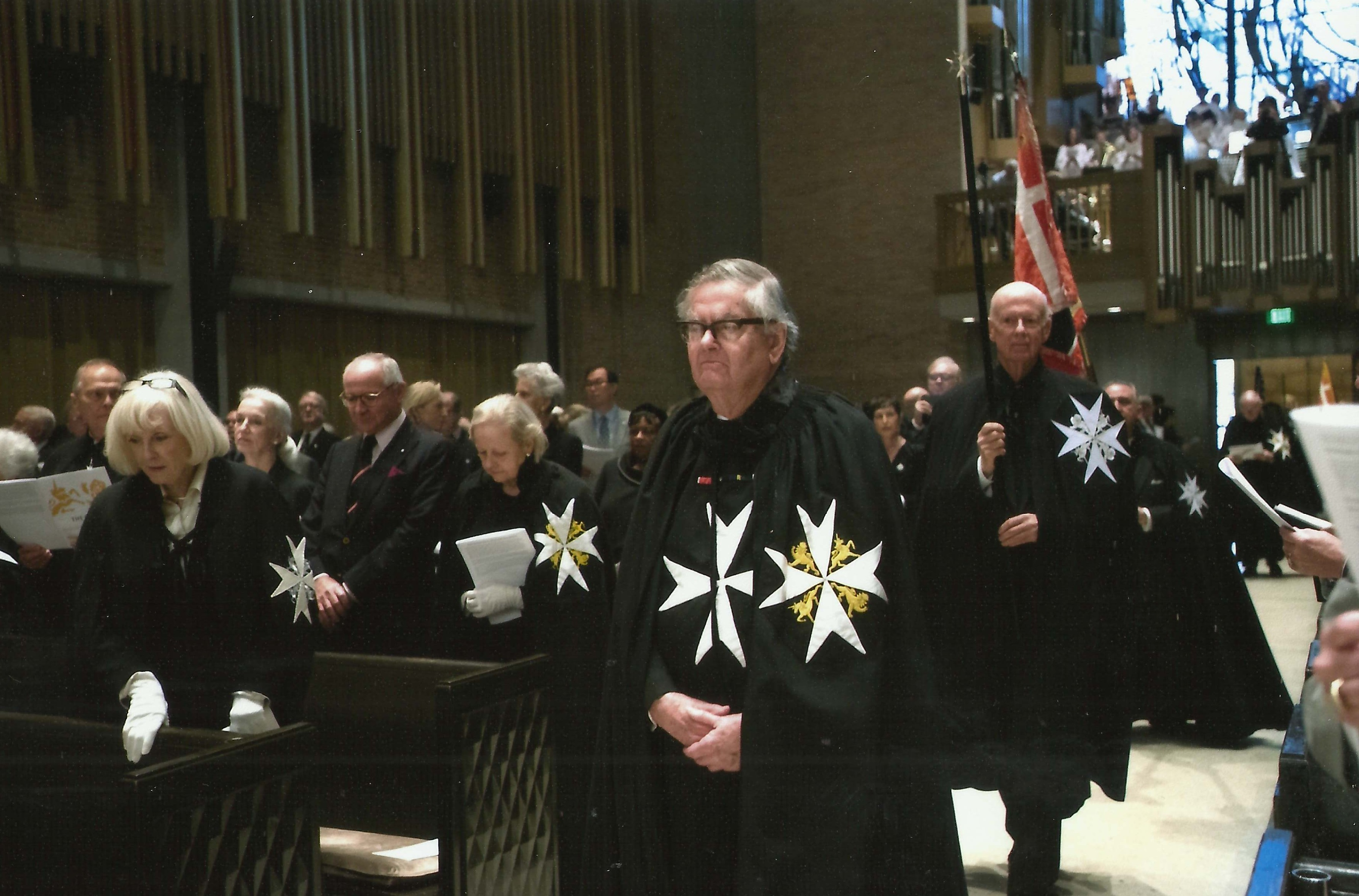
Former Lord Prior of the Most Venerable Order of the Hospital of Saint John of Jerusalem Anthony Mellows frequently attended the Priory in the USA's annual investiture service. He is shown here at the service in October 2015 in Dallas, Texas.

In addition to working with the Saint John Eye Hospital Group and the St. John Volunteer Corps, the Priory in the United States of America is involved in other cooperative work with other establishments of the Order of St. John and other organizations. As one of 11 international Priories of the Order of St John, the Priory in the United States has twice been the host of the annual Grand Council meeting of the International Order of St John. It also has supported various appeals from the international office in London. These have included the Grand Prior's appeal for the Priory of South Africa for its home-based care training programs, St. John programs in Sri Lanka and Canada, and renovation projects for the Order's Priory Church crypt and museum in Clerkenwell, London. On a personal level, members of the Priory in the United States respond to the disasters such as tsunamis in Asia, Hurricane Katrina in the United States, and a cholera epidemic in Zimbabwe by providing medical equipment, supplies and financial support to relief efforts.

== Notable members ==
- Sanford Bishop
- Quinn Bradlee
- Bucky Bush
- Michael Curry
- Horace W. B. Donegan
- Douglas Fairbanks, Jr.
- Daniel G. P. Gutierrez
- Grayson L. Kirk
- Madeleine L'Engle
- P. Allen Smith
- Michael J. Quigley
