= Eric Berry (disambiguation) =

Eric Berry (born 1988) is an American former football player.

Eric Berry may also refer to:

- Eric Berry (actor) (1913–1993), British actor
- Erick Berry (1892–1974), American author and illustrator
- Erik Berry, of the band Trampled by Turtles

== See also ==
- Eric Barry (1927–2015), Canadian Army officer
