= George Alston-Roberts-West =

British Army officer (1937–2023)

Lieutenant-Colonel George Arthur Alston-Roberts-West, CVO, DL (23 November 1937 – 16 July 2023), also known as George West, was a British Army officer and member of the Royal Household of the United Kingdom. He served as Comptroller of the Lord Chamberlain's Office from 1987 to 1990.

== Early life ==
Alston-Roberts-West was born on 23 November 1937, the younger son of Major William Reginald James Alston-Roberts-West and his wife Constance Isolde Grosvenor, daughter of Lt.-Colonel Lord Arthur Hugh Grosvenor, a younger son of Hugh Grosvenor, 1st Duke of Westminster. His father was killed in action in 1940 during the Second World War. He was educated at Eton College, an all-boys public school in Berkshire.

== Career ==
Alston-Roberts-West trained at Royal Military Academy, Sandhurst, and was then commissioned into the Grenadier Guards in December 1957. He saw service in England, Northern Ireland, Germany and Cyprus. He retired from the British Army in 1980.

On 10 February 1981, Alston-Roberts-West was appointed Assistant Comptroller of the Lord Chamberlain's Office. On 16 February 1982, he became an Extra Equerry to Queen Elizabeth II. In December 1987, he was appointed Comptroller of the Lord Chamberlain's Office, in succession to Sir John Johnston. He was succeeded by Malcolm Ross on 1 January 1991.

In November 1988, he was appointed a Deputy Lieutenant of Warwickshire.

== Personal life and death ==
On 20 May 1970, Alston-Roberts-West married Hazel Elizabeth Margaret Cook, daughter of Lt. Colonel Sir Thomas Russell Albert Mason Cook.

Alston-Roberts-West died on 16 July 2023, at the age of 85.

== Honours ==
In the 1988 New Year Honours, Alston-Roberts-West was appointed Commander of the Royal Victorian Order (CVO). In July 2006, he was appointed Serving Brother of the Venerable Order of Saint John (SBStJ).
