= General Dalzell =

General Dalzell may refer to:

- Robert Dalzell (British Army officer, born 1662) (1662–1758), British Army general of foot
- Arthur Dalzell, 13th Earl of Carnwath (1851–1941), British Army brigadier general

== See also ==
- Henry Dalzell-Payne (1929–2018), British Army major general
