= Charles St Clair, 17th Lord Sinclair =

Scottish peer

Major Charles Murray Kennedy St Clair, 17th Lord Sinclair, CVO DL (21 June 1914 – 1 April 2004) was a Scottish peer who spent his entire life in the service of the Crown; as a soldier, an officer of arms, an equerry in the Queen Mother's Household, a Scottish representative peer and as a Lord Lieutenant.

== Early and personal life ==
Charles St Clair was born in 1914, the son of the Archibald St Clair (later the 16th Lord Sinclair), and his wife Violet Kennedy, daughter of Col. John Kennedy. He was educated at Eton and Magdalene College, Cambridge. When his father succeeded to the Lordship in 1922, Charles St Clair became known as The Master of Sinclair, in accordance with the usual practice for Scottish peerages. In 1968 he married Anne Cotterell (daughter of Sir Richard Cotterell, 5th Baronet and Lady Lettice Lygon), with whom he had two daughters and a son Matthew Murray Kennedy St Clair, 18th Lord Sinclair, who succeeded him as Lord Sinclair.

== Military career ==
St Clair was commissioned as a Second Lieutenant on the General List of the Territorial Army in 1936 and transferred to the Coldstream Guards in 1937. He was promoted to Lieutenant in 1938. St Clair served in Palestine until 1939, during which time he was wounded and mentioned in despatches. During World War II he served with the Guards Armoured Division. As a result of his wounds, St Clair retired from the army on 29 May 1947 whilst a captain and was granted the honorary rank of Major.

St Clair was also a member of the Royal Company of Archers (The Queen's Bodyguard for Scotland) for many years. This entailed only ceremonial duties.

== Royal Service ==
Charles St Clair was appointed Portcullis Pursuivant of Arms in Ordinary in 1949, thus becoming a member of the Royal Household. Like the other officers of arms, he took part in state ceremonies, including the coronation of Queen Elizabeth II. In 1952 it was St Clair, as Portcullis Pursuivant, who made the ceremonial demand for entry into the City of London for the third traditional reading of the accession proclamation. St Clair was promoted to York Herald of Arms in Ordinary in 1957, and held this office until his resignation in 1968.

He was made a Member (4th Class) of the Royal Victorian Order in the Coronation Honours List, and promoted to Commander in the 1990 Queen's Birthday Honours. He also held the position of Honorary Genealogist to the Order from 1960 to 1968.

In October 1953 St Clair was appointed an Extra Equerry to the Queen Mother, although he had been a personal friend of hers for some years. During this appointment (which he held until her death) he attended the Queen Mother at various public occasions. He often stayed on the Balmoral estate when she visited Scotland, and went fishing with her, as both were keen anglers.

== Public Offices ==
St Clair succeeded his father as Lord Sinclair in November 1957. In 1959 he was elected as one of the Scottish representative peers in the House of Lords, a position also held by the previous four Lords Sinclair. This appointment terminated in 1963 when the passing of the Peerage Act ended the election of representative peers and allowed all Scottish peers to sit in the House of Lords. Before he resigned the office of York Herald, Lord Sinclair was in the possibly unique position of being able to participate in the ceremonial of the State Opening of Parliament either in his capacity as a member of the House of Lords or as a herald. (It is perhaps for their participation in the State Opening that the officers of arms are best known to the general public.)

In 1969 Lord Sinclair was appointed a Deputy Lieutenant of the Stewartry of Kirkcudbright. Due to the replacement of Scottish counties by regions and districts in the mid-1970s, this became a deputy lieutenancy in the Dumfries and Galloway Region (District of Stewartry). In 1977 Lord Sinclair was made Vice-Lord-Lieutenant for the same district, and became Lord Lieutenant in 1982, a position he held until 1989.

Lord Sinclair died on 1 April 2004.

== Arms ==
Coat of arms of Charles St Clair, 17th Lord Sinclair
Escutcheon Argent, a cross engrailed azure.

== Notes ==
Honorary titles
Preceded by Walter John Macdonald Ross	Lord Lieutenant of Kirkcudbright; 1982–1989	Succeeded by Sir Michael Herries
Heraldic offices
Preceded by Anthony Wagner	Portcullis Pursuivant; 1949–1957	Succeeded by Colin Cole
Preceded by Aubrey Toppin	York Herald; 1957–1968	Succeeded by Conrad Swan
Peerage of Scotland
Preceded by Archibald St Clair	Lord Sinclair; 1957–2004	Succeeded by Matthew St. Clair
