= Ted Egan =

Australian folk singer (1932–2025)

The Honourable Ted Egan AO
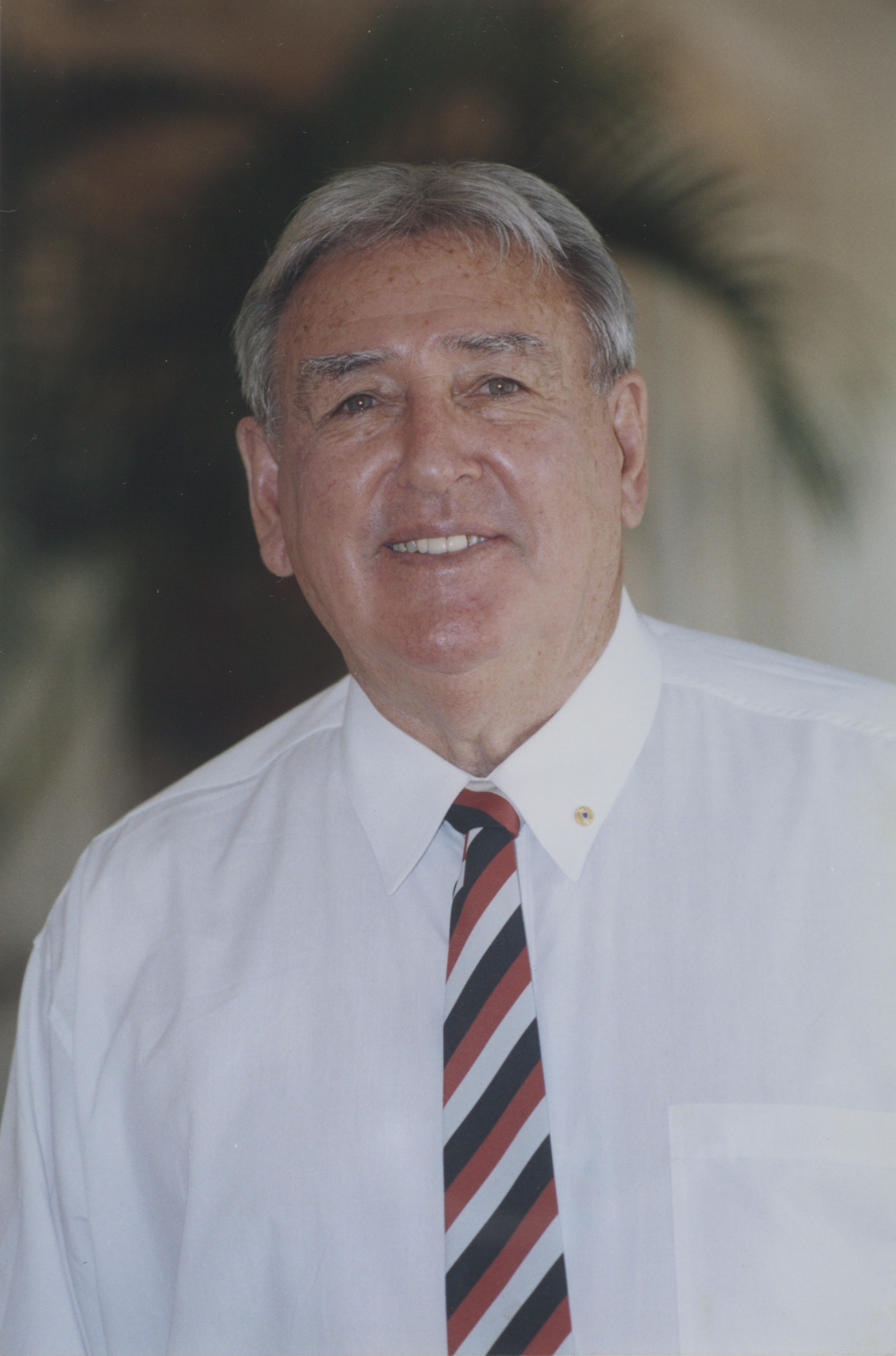
- Egan in 2004

18th Administrator of the Northern Territory
- In office 31 October 2003 – 30 October 2007
- Governor-General: Michael Jeffery
- Preceded by: John Anictomatis
- Succeeded by: Tom Pauling

Personal details
- Born: Edward Joseph Egan; 6 July 1932 Coburg, Victoria, Australia
- Died: 4 December 2025 (aged 93) Alice Springs, Northern Territory, Australia
- Domestic partner: Nerys Evans
- Musical career
- Genre: Folk
- Occupations: Singer; songwriter
- Website: Official website

Edward Joseph Egan AO (6 July 1932 – 4 December 2025) was an Australian folk singer and public servant who served as Administrator of the Northern Territory from 2003 to 2007.

== Early life and education ==
Egan was born in Coburg, Victoria, and was educated at Parade College. He moved to the Northern Territory in 1949 at the age of 16.

In his early career with the Department of Aboriginal Affairs he was engaged in jobs such as stockwork and crocodile hunting while employed as a patrol officer and reserve superintendent. Later he was a teacher at bush schools.

Egan was the sole teacher at the Newcastle Waters Station in 1965 and was stranded at the property for six weeks when the creek flooded. During this time, no supplies were able to be delivered, so Egan had to hunt for animals such as bush turkey for food. He later returned to the station in 2012 for the book launch of Middle of Everywhere about life in the area.

In the late 1960s he worked for the new Office of Aboriginal Affairs and was one of the voices that led to the creation of NAIDOC Week. He later became a member of the first National Council for Aboriginal Reconciliation.

== Music career ==
Egan began recording in 1969 with "Drinkers of the Northern Territory", which enjoyed considerable local popularity. He subsequently released 30 albums, mostly themed around outback life, history and Aboriginal people.

Egan wrote the song "Gurindji Blues" in 1969 with Vincent Lingiari during the Wave Hill walk-off. Egan said he was moved to write the song after hearing Peter Nixon, then Minister for the Interior, say in parliament that if the Gurindji people wanted land, they should save up and buy it like any other Australian. Nixon was also mentioned in the song.

Egan was a regular performer at the National Folk Festival and received a lifetime achievement award there in 2015.

== Administrator of the Northern Territory ==
Egan was appointed Administrator of the Northern Territory by Governor-General Michael Jeffery effective 31 October 2003. He was sworn in on 18 November.

On 14 September 2005, Egan was given a one-year extension to his term of office by Jim Lloyd, the federal Minister for Local Government, Territories and Roads. This was extended for another year until 30 October 2007.

== Television ==
Egan presented and narrated six episodes of the 1989 series This Land Australia, a series devoted to iconic Australian people and places. He also wrote and performed the show's theme song of the same name. He was a co-host of the lifestyle show The Great Outdoors.

== Death ==
Egan died on 4 December 2025 at the age of 93. The Northern Territory's chief minister, Lia Finocchiaro, announced that Egan would receive a state funeral.

== Albums ==
List of albums
Title	Album details
Outback Australia	Released: 1972; Label: RCA (SL 101976); Formats: LP
The Bangtail Muster	Released: 1973; Label: RCA (SL 102350); Formats: LP, cassette
Once a Jolly Swagman	Released: 1974; Label: RCA Australia (VPL1-0049); Formats: LP, cassette
Beyond the Black Stump	Released: 1975; Label: RCA Victor (VPL1-0113); Formats: LP, cassette
The Bush Races	Released: 1976; Label: RCA Victor (VPL1-0139); Formats: LP, cassette
Rodeo Australia	Released: 1980; Label: RCA Australia (VPL1 0286); Formats: LP, cassette
A Town Like Alice	Released: 1980; Label: RCA Australia (VPL1 0313); Formats: LP, cassette
Arnhem Land Lullaby	Released: 1981; Label: RCA Rockaway (DPL-610); Formats: LP, cassette
The Overlanders	Released: 1982; Label: Faces of Australia Series, ABC Records (TELP 1001); Formats: LP, cassette
Our Coach Captain	Released: 1983; Label: EMI; Formats: LP, cassette
The Shearers	Released: 1984; Label: Faces of Australia Series, ABC Records (TELP 1002); Formats: LP, cassette
The Anzacs (with Judy Small, Eric Bogle, Nerys Evans and the Anzac Band & Singers)	Released: 1985; Label: Faces of Australia Series, ABC Records (TELP 1003); Formats: LP, cassette
My Australia: The Very Best of Ted Egan	Released: 1986; Label: J&B Records (JB 248); Formats: LP, cassette; Compilation
The Aboriginals	Released: 1987; Label: Faces of Australia Series, ABC Records (TELP 1004); Formats: LP, cassette
The Convicts	Released: 1989; Label: Faces of Australia Series, ABC Records (TELP 1005); Formats: LP, cassette
This Land Australia	Released: 1989; Label: EMI (EMX 793212); Formats: LP, cassette
Echoes in the Dust (with Andrew Langford)	Released: 1989; Label: The Original Dreamtime Art Gallery; Formats: Cassette
Welcome to the Bush	Released: 1994; Label: Castle Communications; Formats: CD
The Urupunga Frog (Australian Songs for Children)	Released: 1999; Label: Formats: CD
Packhorse Drover (with Bruce Simpson)	Released: 2000; Label: ABC Audio (0642557020); Formats: CD
The Drover's Boy – A Celebration of Australian Women (with Nerys Evans)	Released: 2002; Formats: CD
I.O.U	Released: 2002; Formats: CD
The Land Downunder	Released: 2003; Label: Evergreen Media (EVGR 002); Formats: 2×CD, digital
Such Is Life	Released: 2003; Label: EMI Music Distribution; Formats: CD, digital
Saving the Best	Released: August 2010; Label: ABC; Formats: CD, digital

== Charting singles ==
Title	Year	Peak chart positions	Album
Title	Year	AUS	Album
"Willie The Whingeing Pom"	1973	93	The Bangtail Muster

== Books ==
- 1978 Outback Holiday (also by Mark Egan) ISBN 0-7295-0040-3
- 1979 A Drop of Rough Ted ISBN 0-9595744-0-9
- 1984 The Overlanders Songbook ISBN 0-909104-74-3
- 1987 The Aboriginals Songbook – Faces of Australia Series ASIN B000N7AKU0
- 1989 Shearers Songbook ISBN 0-909104-75-1
- 1991 Would I Lie to You? The Goanna Driver and Other Very True Stories ISBN 0-670-90460-0
- 1993 The Paperboys War Ted Egan An Autobiography ISBN 1-875703-08-X
- 1996 Justice All Their Own ISBN 0522846939
- 1997 Sitdown Up North Ted Egan An Autobiography ISBN 1-875703-23-3
- 1997 The Drover's Boy ISBN 0-85091-840-5
- 2003 The Land Downunder ISBN 0-9545726-0-2
- 2008 Due Inheritance ISBN 0-7295-0040-3
- 2011 Kutju Australia: An Australian Translation of Advance Australia Fair ISBN 9780980861921
- 2014 The ANZACS 100 Years On: in Story and Song ISBN 9780987381156
- 2019 Outback Songman: My Life ISBN 9781760871437

== Videos ==
- This Land Australia series (as presenter, narrator and interviewer)

- Broome and the Pearl Coast
- Cape York Peninsula: The Vanishing Frontier
- Central Australia: The Eighth Wonder
- Discovering a Rainforest
- Gulf Country: The Road from Mt. Surprise
- Hahndorf and the Barossa: Valleys of Hope
- The Islands of Torres Strait
- Mysterious Australia
- Norfolk Island
- Paddleboats of the Murray River
- Railways of Yesteryear
- Snowy Mountains

== Honours ==
Egan was made a Member of the Order of Australia (AM) in the 1993 Australia Day Honours List for services to the Aboriginal people and "an ongoing contribution to the literary heritage of Australia through song and verse".

In 2004, Egan was promoted to an Officer of the Order (AO) in acknowledgement of "the significance of [his] continuing contribution to the community culminating in his being sworn-in as the 18th Administrator of the Northern Territory".

Egan was listed among the Australian Living Treasures by the National Trust of Australia.

Egan was the recipient of the National Folk Festival's Lifetime Achievement Award in April 2015 at the festival's opening ceremony in Canberra. He performed four songs at the event, including one about pioneering women in Australia.

=== ARIA Music Awards ===
The ARIA Music Awards are a set of annual ceremonies presented by Australian Recording Industry Association (ARIA) which recognise excellence, innovation and achievement across all genres of the music of Australia. They commenced in 1987.

Year	Nominee / work	Award	Result	Ref.
1990	This Land Australia	Best Country Album	Nominated	

=== Australian Roll of Renown ===
The Australian Roll of Renown honours Australian and New Zealander musicians who have shaped the music industry by making a significant and lasting contribution to country music. It was inaugurated in 1976 and the inductee is announced at the Country Music Awards of Australia in Tamworth in January.

Year	Nominee / work	Award	Result
1995	Ted Egan	Australian Roll of Renown	inductee

=== Country Music Awards of Australia ===
The Country Music Awards of Australia (CMAA) (also known as the Golden Guitar Awards) is an annual awards night, held in January during the Tamworth Country Music Festival, celebrating recording excellence in the Australian country music industry. They have been held annually since 1973.

Year	Nominee / work	Award	Result
2000	"The Drover's Boy"	Video Clip of the Year	Won
2014	Ted Egan	Lifetime Achievement Award	awarded

=== Tamworth Songwriters Awards ===
The Tamworth Songwriters Awards is an annual songwriting contest for original country songs awarded in January at the Tamworth Country Music Festival. They commenced in 1986.

Year	Nominee / work	Award	Result (wins only)
1991	Ted Egan	Songmaker Award	awarded
2011	"Queensland Opera" by Ted Egan	Comedy/Novelty Song of the Year	Won
2011	"The Laughing Game" by Ted Egan	Children's Song of the Year	Won

Government offices
Preceded by John Anictomatis	Administrator of the Northern Territory; 2003–2007	Succeeded by Tom Pauling
