= Neil Conn =

Australian economist

The Honourable Neil Conn AO

Lord Prior of the Order of Saint John
- In office 24 June 2014 – 31 August 2016
- Monarch: Elizabeth II
- Preceded by: Anthony Mellows
- Succeeded by: Sir Malcolm Ross

14th Administrator of the Northern Territory
- In office 17 February 1997 – 30 October 2000
- Governor-General: Sir William Deane
- Preceded by: Austin Asche
- Succeeded by: John Anictomatis

Personal details
- Born: Neil Raymond Conn; 17 August 1936 (age 90) Sydney, New South Wales
- Spouse: Lesley Jennifer née Flood
- Education: University of Sydney; Duke University
- Profession: Economist
- Awards: Officer of the Order of Australia; Bailiff Grand Cross of the Order of St John

Military service
- Allegiance: Australia
- Branch/service: Australian Army
- Rank: Lieutenant

Neil Raymond Conn, AO (born 17 August 1936), is an Australian economist and former Administrator of the Northern Territory (1997–2000).

Dr Conn was appointed by Queen Elizabeth II as Lord Prior of the Order of Saint John in 2014, being succeeded by Sir Malcolm Ross in 2016.

== Life and career ==
Conn read economics at the University of Sydney, graduating BSc and later MEc. He studied for his doctorate (PhD) at Duke University in the United States, before lecturing in economics at Sydney University from 1961 to 1975. He left the university in 1975 to work for two years as Principal Administrator with the OECD in Paris, followed by four years as Deputy Secretary of the New South Wales Treasury.

Conn was appointed by the newly-independent Northern Territory Government as Chief Executive Officer of the Territory's Treasury and was the Administrator of the Northern Territory from 17 February 1997 to 30 October 2000.

Following his retirement as Administrator, Conn became foundation chairman of Original IT Investments Pty Ltd, an information technology incubator. From 2001 to 2004 he was deputy chairman and lead independent director of the publicly listed company International All Sports Ltd.

Conn lives in Sydney with his wife Lesley (died 2021 according to NT News) , a Member of the Order of Australia and Dame of the Order of Saint John. Dr and Mrs Conn have three children.

== Order of St John ==
Conn was appointed a Deputy Prior of the Order of Saint John in Australia in 1997, before serving as Chairman of St John Ambulance Australia from 2004 to 2007.

At the 2007 St John Ambulance Australia National Priory Conference, he was nominated as Chancellor of the Priory of Saint John in Australia, replacing Professor Villis Marshall.

In 2014, Conn was promoted as the Lord Prior of the Order of Saint John, becoming its most senior non-royal figure. He was succeeded by Sir Malcolm Ross in 2016.

== Honours ==
Officer of the Order of Australia (AO)	26 January 1996
Bailiff Grand Cross of the Order of St John (GCStJ)	2012 (Note: The post-nominals of the Venerable Order of St John were recognised in the Australian Honours Order of Wearing prior to 5 October 1992. From 6 October 1992 the post-nominals are no longer recognised and cannot be used outside of the organisation.)
Knight of the Order of St John	21 March 1997
Centenary Medal	1 January 2001
Australian Defence Medal	2006
Anniversary of National Service Medal	2001
Service Medal of the Order of St John	2009 (Note: The Service Medal of the Order of St John was recognised in the Australian Honours Order of Wearing prior to 5 October 1992. From 6 October 1992 the medal is now no longer recognised for wear.)
Cross pro Merito Melitensi (SMOM)	2014

== See also ==
- The Alliance of the Orders of Saint John of Jerusalem
- Government of Australia

== Notes ==
Government offices
Preceded by Austin Asche	Administrator of the Northern Territory; 1997 – 2000	Succeeded by John Anictomatis
Other offices
Preceded by Anthony Mellows	Lord Prior of the Order of Saint John; 2014 – 2016	Succeeded by Sir Malcolm Ross
