= Tom Pauling (barrister) =

Australian barrister (1946–2023)

The Honourable Thomas Ian Pauling AO KC

8th Administrator of the Northern Territory
- In office 9 November 2007 – 31 October 2011
- Monarch: Elizabeth II
- Governor-General: Michael Jeffery AC CVO MC
- Preceded by: Ted Egan AO
- Succeeded by: Sally Thomas AM

Personal details
- Born: 13 December 1946 Sydney, Australia
- Died: 23 November 2023 (aged 76)
- Spouse: Judith Therese (Tessa) Wilkinson
- Children: Fred Pauling; Zoe Pauling
- Education: Sydney Law School
- Profession: Barrister
- Website: www.nt.gov.au/administrator

Thomas Ian Pauling AO KC (13 December 1946 – 23 November 2023) was an Australian lawyer and an administrator of the Northern Territory.

== Career ==
Born in Sydney, Pauling was educated at Drummoyne Boys' High School, and graduated with a Bachelor of Laws (LLB) from the Sydney Law School (Syd). He was admitted to the Bar in New South Wales in 1969, and worked for the NSW Public Solicitor. In March 1970, he moved to Darwin in the Northern Territory, where he practised as a barrister and lived in Fannie Bay.

Pauling was made a Queen's Counsel (QC) in 1984, and was Solicitor-General of the Northern Territory from 1988 to 2007.

In September 2007, he was appointed Administrator of the Northern Territory, replacing Ted Egan. He was sworn in by the Governor-General of Australia, Michael Jeffery, on 9 November 2007. His term expired on 31 October 2011 when Sally Thomas was sworn in as the first female Administrator of the Northern Territory.

In the 2008 Queen's Birthday Honours, Pauling was appointed an Officer of the Order of Australia (AO) "for service to the Northern Territory through significant contributions to the law, particularly relating to constitutional matters, to the development of legal organisations and the promotion of professional standards, and to the community."

Pauling died on 23 November 2023, at the age of 76.

Government offices
Preceded by Ted Egan	Administrator of the Northern Territory; 2007–2011	Succeeded by Sally Thomas
