= Gordon Guthrie Malcolm Bachelor =

Scottish monarch's representative

Colonel Gordon Guthrie Malcolm Bachelor was Lord Lieutenant of Kirkcudbright from 7 September 1975 to 16 November 1976.

== Notes ==
Honorary titles
Preceded by Randolph Algernon Ronald Stewart, 12th Earl of Galloway	Lord Lieutenant of Kirkcudbright; 7 September 1975 – 16 November 1976	Succeeded by Walter John Macdonald Ross
