= Walter John Macdonald Ross =

British Army officer

Walter John Macdonald Ross , CB OBE MC TD (1914–1982) was a British Army officer who served as Lord Lieutenant of Kirkcudbright from 1977 to 1982.

== Personal life ==
Ross was son of Major Robert Ross (1877–1935), deputy assistant provost marshal for the West Scotland area and owner of the Ledgowan estate at Achnasheen, Ross-shire. He was educated at Loretto School, where he was a Cadet Under-Officer in the Officers' Training Corps.

Ross married Josephine May Cross, and had two sons and a daughter; the elder, Lt-Col Malcolm Ross (1943–2019), was a member of the Royal Household of the Sovereign of the United Kingdom and, from 2006, of the household of Charles, Prince of Wales, and the younger, Robert Ross, was Keeper of the Records of the Duchy of Cornwall until retiring in 2013. The family lived at Netherhall, Balmaghie, Castle Douglas, Kirkcudbrightshire (now in the Dumfries and Galloway) administrative area.

== Military career and honours ==
Ross was commissioned as a second lieutenant in the 80th (Lowland) Brigade, Royal Field Artillery of the Territorial Army in 1935. He reached the rank of Territorial Army staff Colonel, formerly of the 5th King's Own Scottish Borderers; he held the Territorial Decoration, was awarded the Military Cross in 1946 whilst a Major in the Royal Artillery, and was appointed OBE in the 1955 New Year Honours, and CB in the 1958 Birthday Honours.

From 1977 to 1982, Ross served as Lord Lieutenant of Kirkcudbright; he was also a Justice of the peace.

== Notes ==
Honorary titles
Preceded by Gordon Guthrie Malcolm Bachelor	Lord Lieutenant of Kirkcudbright; 1977–1982	Succeeded by Charles St Clair, 17th Lord Sinclair
