= M. A. R. Herries =

Sir M. A. R. Herries

Chairman of The Royal Bank of Scotland

Chairman of the Jardine Matheson Holdings

Personal details
- Born: Michael Alexander Robert Young-Herries; 28 February 1923 Dumfries and Galloway, Scotland
- Died: 6 May 1995 (aged 72) UK
- Spouse: Elizabeth Hilary Russell Smith
- Children: William, Robert, Julia

Sir Michael Alexander Robert Young-Herries OBE MC (28 February 1923 – 6 May 1995) was the chairman and managing director of Jardine Matheson & Co. from 1963 to 1970 and was the Chairman of The Royal Bank of Scotland from 1978 to 1991.

Born in Scotland in the Dumfries and Galloway region, he was educated at Eton where he excelled in Classics and sports then later at Trinity College in Cambridge. While at Cambridge in 1942, his studies were interrupted by his service with the King's Own Scottish Borderers, serving in Europe, later on his regiment was transferred to the Middle East, in Egypt then in Palestine. Attaining the rank of Captain and awarded the Military Cross for gallantry in action, he returned to Cambridge in 1947 to continue his studies in Classics.

In 1949, Herries joined Jardine, Matheson & Co. as a junior accountant and was immediately asked to report to Hong Kong in the Far East. Before moving, he had married Elizabeth Smith and transferred to Hong Kong with her. In just a short time as junior accountant, he was promoted to general manager. A brilliant manager, Herries moved up the corporate ladder fast and in less than ten years reached the rank of associate director. In 1959, he became Director overseeing a large division within the group. In 1962, he became the Deputy Managing Director reporting to then chairman and Managing Director Hugh Barton. Upon Barton's retirement in June 1963, Herries became chairman and managing director of Jardines, acquiring the title of 'Tai-pan'.

As 'Tai-pan' of Jardines, he oversaw the group's rapid rise to become an international conglomerate. Herries did much in transforming Jardines from an old-fashioned trading company into a modern enterprise run by a modern team of managers. He is best remembered for confidently steering the group during the tumultuous 1966–67 revolution that convulsed Hong Kong and was prodded by the Chinese Communist Government. For his actions, he was awarded a Knighthood in 1968.

Herries retired from Jardines in 1970. He had an outstanding business reputation in Hong Kong and the Far East from his years of successfully managing a large diversified conglomerate and doing public service. He was an active member of the non-executive Legislative Council of Hong Kong and a member of several trade groups, universities and associations.

After a brief association with Jardines after his retirement, he joined The Royal Bank of Scotland as vice-chairman in 1974, Deputy Chairman in 1975 and chairman in 1976 and retired in 1992. He was also a director of the London Tin Corporation, Scottish Widows Fund & Life Assurance Society; Lloyds & Scottish; and Scottish Mortgage & Trust plc.

Herries received an Honorary Doctorate from Heriot-Watt University in 1984

== Family ==
Sir Michael and his wife, Elizabeth, had two sons and a daughter. Sir Michael Herries died on 6 May 1995.

Business positions
| Preceded by Hugh Barton | Chairman of the Jardine, Matheson & Co. 1963–1970 | Succeeded by Sir Henry Keswick |
Honorary titles
| Preceded by The Lord Sinclair | Lord Lieutenant of Kirkcudbright; 1989–1995 | Succeeded by Sir Norman Arthur |
