= Malcolm Ross (courtier) =

British royal courtier

Lieutenant-Colonel Sir Malcolm Ross GCVO OBE DL
- Ross in 2018

Lord Prior of St John
- In office 1 September 2016 – 25 June 2019
- Monarch: Elizabeth II
- Preceded by: Neil Conn
- Succeeded by: Mark Compton

Extra Equerry to the Queen
- In office 1988–2019
- Monarch: Elizabeth II

Master of the Household to the Prince of Wales
- In office 2006–2008
- Preceded by: Kevin Knott
- Succeeded by: Richard Pattle

Comptroller of the Lord Chamberlain's Office
- In office 1991–2005
- Preceded by: George Alston-Roberts-West
- Succeeded by: Sir Andrew Ford

Personal details
- Born: 27 October 1943
- Died: 27 October 2019 (aged 76)
- Spouse: Susan Jane Gow (m. 1969)
- Relations: Sir Robert Ross (brother); Sir Michael Gow (f-in-law); Sophie Hunter (niece)
- Children: 1 son, 2 daus
- Parent: Colonel Walter Ross CB (f)
- Education: Eton College
- Alma mater: RMA Sandhurst
- Awards: Knight Grand Cross of the Royal Victorian Order; Bailiff Grand Cross of the Order of St John; Officer of the Order of the British Empire; Mentioned in Dispatches

Military service
- Allegiance: United Kingdom
- Branch/service: British Army
- Rank: Lieutenant-Colonel
- Unit: Scots Guards

Lieutenant-Colonel Sir Walter Hugh Malcolm Ross, GCVO OBE DL (27 October 1943 – 27 October 2019), was a member of the British Royal Household, becoming Master of the Household to then-Prince Charles from 2006 to 2008.

Sir Malcolm Ross served as Lord-Lieutenant for the Stewartry of Kirkcudbright from 2006 until 2018 and also, from 2016, as Lord Prior of the Order of St John.

== Early life and background ==
Born in 1943 at Borgue to Josephine May née Cross (1915–1982) and Colonel Walter John Macdonald Ross, Lord-Lieutenant of Kirkcudbrightshire (1977–1982). A kinsman of Sir Charles Ross, 9th Baronet, his grandfather was Major Robert Ross of Ledgowan (1877–1935).

Ross was educated at Eton and Sandhurst, before being commissioned into the Scots Guards in 1964. Adjutant of the Royal Military Academy Sandhurst (1977–79), he was promoted Lieutenant-Colonel in 1982, before retiring from British Army service in 1987.

== Career ==
Ross joined the Royal Household in 1987 as Assistant Comptroller and Management Auditor of the Lord Chamberlain's Office. Appointed Secretary of the Central Chancery of the Orders of Knighthood in 1989, he relinquished his auditing responsibilities and continued as Assistant Comptroller until 1990.

Promoted Comptroller of the Lord Chamberlain's Office 1991–2005, and Master of the Household to the Prince of Wales from 2006 until 2008, Ross then appointed an Extra Equerry to the Queen.

A member of the Royal Company of Archers since 1981, Ross was admitted as a Freeman of the City of London in 1994.

From 2006, HM Lord Lieutenant of the Stewartry of Kirkcudbright in succession to Sir Norman Arthur, who had appointed him a Deputy Lieutenant in 2003, Sir Malcolm retired from the Lord Lieutenancy on 27 October 2018 upon reaching his 75th birthday.

In 2007, Ross was appointed non-executive chairman of international security and defence Westminster Group plc, whilst continuing to fulfill his Royal Household duties.

=== Honours ===
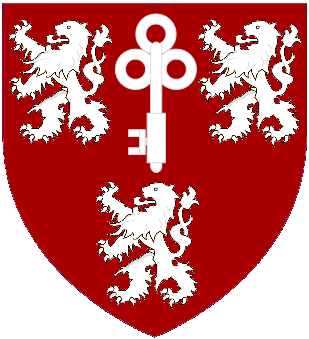
Ross's shield of arms appears on a stall plate at Westminster Abbey.

- : Royal Victorian Order (GCVO)
- : Order of the British Empire (OBE)
- : Order of St John (GCStJ)

Appointed OBE in 1988, then CVO in 1994, and knighted as KCVO in 1999, being promoted GCVO in 2005, on 1 September 2016, Sir Malcolm was further honoured becoming Lord Prior and a Bailiff Grand Cross of the Most Venerable Order of the Hospital of Saint John of Jerusalem.

== Family ==
On 31 January 1969 Ross married Susan Jane Gow (b. 1949), eldest daughter of General Sir Michael Gow and Jane Emily née Scott (1925–2024), elder sister of Brough Scott.

Sir Malcolm and Lady Ross had three children:

- Tabitha Alice Ross (b. 1970), m. 2002 Luke Lillingston
- Flora Jane Josephine Ross (b. 1974), m. 2002 James Harvey
- Hector Walter James Ross (b. 1983), m. 2014 Samantha Jenkinson.

Sir Malcolm died on 27 October 2019, his birthday, at the age of 76.

Lady Ross' niece is Sophie Hunter (b. 1978), wife of actor Benedict Cumberbatch. His younger brother, Sir Robert Ross, was Keeper of the Records of the Duchy of Cornwall from 1997 until 2013, and his sister is Susan, Countess of Annandale and Hartfell.

== See also ==
- Ledgowan, Ross-shire
- Order of St John

Honorary titles
Preceded by Sir Norman Arthur	Lord Lieutenant of Kirkcudbright; 2006–2018	Succeeded by Elizabeth Patricia Gilroy
Preceded by The Hon. Neil Conn	Lord Prior of the Order St John; 2016–2019	Succeeded by Professor; Mark Compton
