= Ledgowan Forest =

Deer forest in Scotland

Coordinates: 57°32′48″N 5°9′3″W

Ledgowan Forest is a deer forest in the Northwest Highlands of Scotland. It stands in Wester Ross to the southwest of Achnasheen. Ledgowan Forest is the location of Carron Bog, the starting point of the River Carron.

Ledgowan Estate (which is almost synonymous with Ledgowan Forest) is owned by Rainheath Ltd, and extends over 12,000 acres (49 km^{2}) in this area. There is a hunting lodge just to the west of Achnasheen. Ledgowan was previously owned by Major Robert Ross, father of Walter John Macdonald Ross and grandfather of the courtier Malcolm Ross.

The main attraction of Ledgowan Forest is stalking (as deer hunting is called in Scotland). Stalking is available on two separate beats on a mix of rolling hills and steep corries. Large stags are plentiful and the area was mentioned several times in the recent Half a Century of Scottish Deer Stalking by G. Kenneth Whitehead.

This region also offers wild trout fishing on the River Bran and lochs including Loch a'Chroisg and Loch Gowan. There is also Salmon fishing on the River Blackwater and gillies may be hired for this purpose. Grouse shooting occur locally in small numbers as well.
