= Norman Arthur =

British commanding officer (1931–2023)

Lieutenant-General Sir Norman Arthur KCB CVO
- Born: 6 March 1931; Kensington, London, England
- Died: 18 December 2023 (aged 92)
- Military career
- Allegiance: United Kingdom
- Branch: British Army
- Service years: 1951–1988
- Rank: Lieutenant-General
- Commands: Royal Scots Dragoon Guards; 7th Armoured Brigade; 3rd Armoured Division; General Officer Commanding Scotland
- Conflicts: Operation Banner
- Awards: Knight Commander of the Order of the Bath; Commander of the Royal Victorian Order

Lieutenant-General Sir John Norman Stewart Arthur, KCB, CVO (6 March 1931 – 18 December 2023) was the General Officer Commanding in Scotland.

== Military career ==
Educated at Eton College and the Royal Military Academy, Sandhurst, Arthur was commissioned into the Royal Scots Greys in 1951. At the 1960 Summer Olympics in Rome he was part of the British equestrian team for the three-day event; he withdrew after the cross-country phase.

Arthur was appointed commanding officer of the Royal Scots Dragoon Guards in 1972 and mentioned in despatches for service in Northern Ireland in 1974 during The Troubles. He became commander of 7th Armoured Brigade in 1976.

Arthur went on to be general officer commanding 3rd Armoured Division in 1980 and Director of Personal Services (Army) in 1983. He was given the colonelcy of the Royal Scots Dragoon Guards in 1984, a position he held until 1998. He was appointed General Officer Commanding Scotland and Governor of Edinburgh Castle in 1985; he retired in 1988.

In 1996 he became Lord Lieutenant of the Stewartry of Kirkcudbright, Dumfries and Galloway Region, and held this post until succeeded by Malcolm Ross in March 2006.

== Personal life and death ==
In 1960 he married Theresa Mary Hopkinson; they went on to have two sons (one of whom died) and a daughter. He married again in 2012 to Jillian Andrews.

Arthur died on 18 December 2023, at the age of 92.

Military offices
Preceded by Henry Dalzell-Payne	General Officer Commanding the 3rd Armoured Division; 1980–1982	Succeeded by Antony Walker
Preceded by Sir Alexander Boswell	GOC Scotland; 1985–1988	Succeeded by Sir John MacMillan
Honorary titles
Preceded by Sir Michael Herries	Lord Lieutenant of Kirkcudbright; 1996–2006	Succeeded by Sir Malcolm Ross
