= Mark Compton =

Australian business administrator and Lord Prior of the Order of St John

Mark Compton AM GCStJ FRSN

Lord Prior of the Order of Saint John
- Incumbent
- Assumed office 24 June 2019
- Monarchs: Elizabeth II; Charles III
- Preceded by: Sir Malcolm Ross

Personal details
- Born: Mark Raymond Compton; 25 June 1961 (age 65) Sydney, New South Wales
- Spouse: Elizabeth Ellis
- Education: University of Sydney
- Awards: AM (2010); GCStJ (2017)

Mark Raymond Compton AM GCStJ FRSN (born 25 June 1961), is an Australian social care business administrator, who has served as Lord Prior of the Order of Saint John since 2019.

An adjunct professor in the Macquarie Graduate School of Management (MGSM) since 2012, Compton was appointed in 2019 by Queen Elizabeth II as Lord Prior of the Most Venerable Order of Saint John of Jerusalem in succession to Sir Malcolm Ross.

== Life and career ==
After graduating BSc at the University of New South Wales, Compton entered the Australian Graduate School of Management where he pursued further studies in business management, taking the degree of MBA from UNSW Business School.

Compton then worked in healthcare and life sciences organisations including ASX-listed companies. In 2009 he joined St Luke's Care a not-for-profit health and aged care organisation as CEO, becoming Non-Executive Chairman in 2017. Since 2015 Compton serves as Chairman and Non-Executive Director of Sonic Healthcare Limited.

A NED of Macquarie University Hospital from 2010 until 2018, Compton served as Chairman of Next Science from 2018 until 2023.

He is a volunteer firefighter serving as a Senior Deputy Captain with the NSW Rural Fire Service in the Southern Highlands (New South Wales).

Professor Compton lives at Bowral, New South Wales, with his wife Dr Elizabeth Ellis, a physiotherapist and Officer of the Order of Saint John. They have two sons, Michael and Daniel.

== Order of St John ==
Compton joined St John Ambulance in 1974, and served as a Cadet. Appointed Chancellor of the Order of Saint John in Australia in 2013, Compton was also Chairman of St John Ambulance Australia until 2019.

Promoted Lord Prior in 2019, Compton succeeded Sir Malcolm Ross as the Order of Saint John's most senior non-royal figure.

== Honours and awards ==
- Member of the Order of Australia (AM)
- Bailiff Grand Cross of the Order of St John of Jerusalem (GCStJ)
- National Emergency Medal
- Centenary Medal
- Service Medal, Order of St John of Jerusalem (with 3 Bars)
- Queen Elizabeth II Platinum Jubilee Medal
- King Charles III Coronation Medal
- Cross pro Merito Melitensi
  - Fellow of the Australian Institute of Company Directors (FAICD)
  - Fellow of the Australasian College of Health Services Management (FCHSM)
  - Fellow of the Australian Institute of Management (FAIM)
  - Fellow of the Royal Society of New South Wales (FRSN).

== See also ==
- The Alliance of the Orders of Saint John of Jerusalem
- William Compton, 5th Marquess of Northampton, KG, KGStJ

Honorary titles
Preceded by Sir Malcolm Ross	Lord Prior of the Order of Saint John; 2019 –	Succeeded by in office
