= John Anictomatis =

Greek Australian

The Honourable John Anictomatis AO
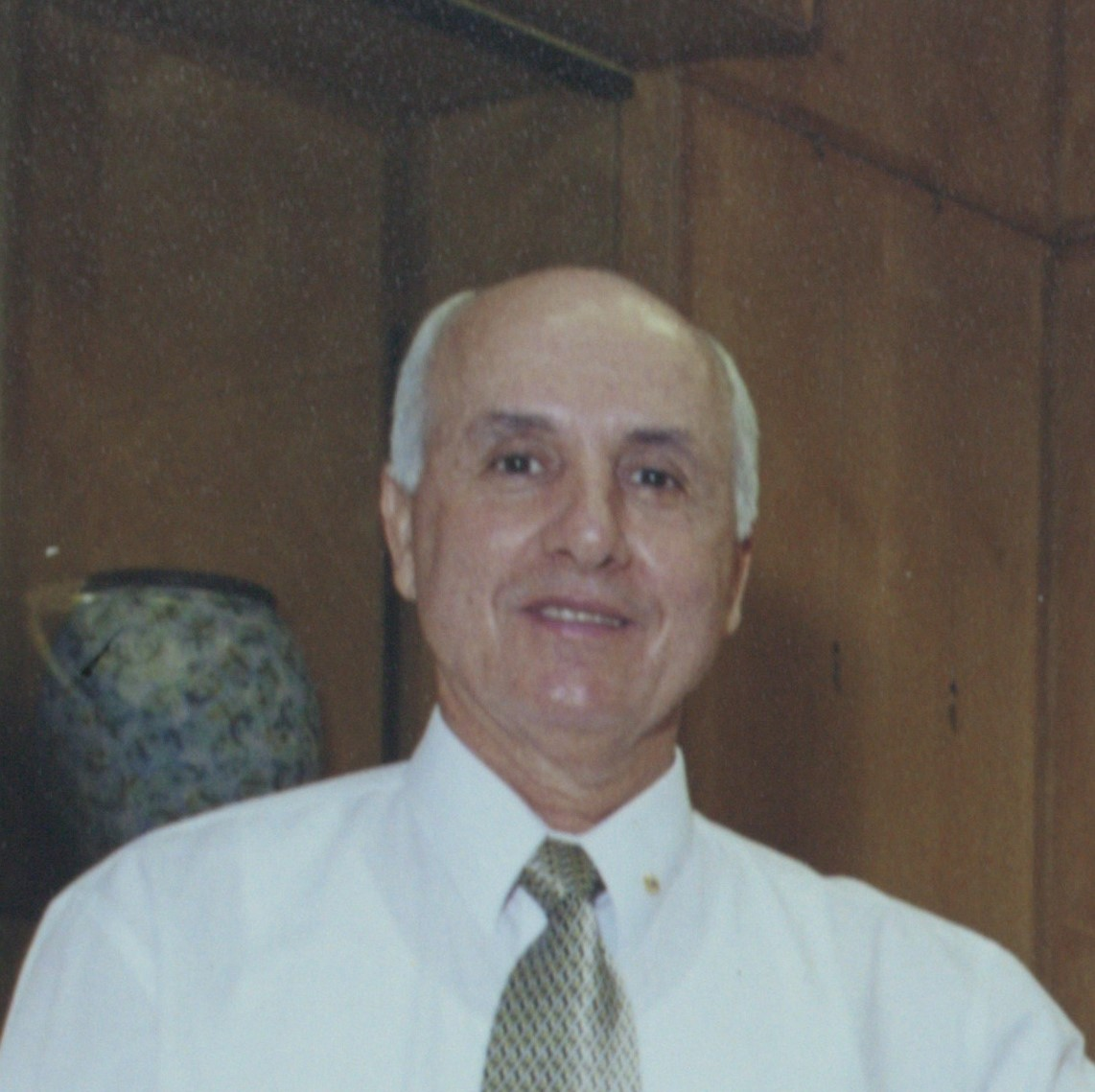

Administrator of the Northern Territory
- In office 28 November 2000 – 30 October 2003
- Preceded by: Neil Conn
- Succeeded by: Ted Egan

Personal details
- Born: 28 December 1945 (age 80) Piraeus, Greece
- Spouse: Jeanette Anictomatis

Military service
- Allegiance: Australia
- Branch/service: Australian Army
- Years of service: 1968–1970
- Rank: Craftsman
- Unit: 9th Battalion, Royal Australian Regiment
- Battles/wars: Vietnam War

John Christopher Anictomatis AO (born 28 December 1945) is a Greek Australian who served as the Administrator of the Northern Territory from 28 November 2000 to 30 October 2003. Anictomatis was sworn in by Sir William Deane, the Governor-General of Australia. The ceremony was held in Darwin.

He was a businessman and active in community service. His wife Jeanette is British Honorary Consul in Darwin.

Government offices
Preceded by Neil Conn	Administrator of the Northern Territory; 2000–2003	Succeeded by Ted Egan
