= John Johnston (courtier) =

British Army officer (1922–2006)

Lieutenant Colonel Sir John Johnston GCVO, MC

Comptroller of the Lord Chamberlain's Office
- In office 1981–1987
- Monarch: Elizabeth II
- Preceded by: Sir Eric Penn
- Succeeded by: George Alston-Roberts-West

Personal details
- Born: 24 April 1922 Burma, British India
- Died: 10 September 2006 (aged 84)
- Civilian awards: Knight Grand Cross of the Royal Victorian Order
- Nickname: Johnny

Military service
- Allegiance: United Kingdom
- Branch/service: British Army
- Rank: Lieutenant Colonel
- Unit: Grenadier Guards
- Commands: 1st Battalion, Grenadier Guards
- Battles/wars: Second World War
- Military awards: Military Cross

Lieutenant Colonel Sir John Frederick Dame Johnston, GCVO, MC (24 August 1922 – 10 September 2006) was a British Army officer and courtier. He joined the Royal Household in 1964, serving as Assistant Comptroller and then Comptroller of the Lord Chamberlain's Office. Sometimes known as "Stopwatch Johnny", he was one of the Queen's most popular courtiers. His duties included co-ordinating the weddings of Charles, Prince of Wales and Lady Diana Spencer at St Paul's Cathedral in 1981 and of Prince Andrew and Sarah Ferguson at Westminster Abbey in 1986, and the funeral of the Duchess of Windsor at St George's Chapel, Windsor, also in 1986.

== Early life and education ==
Johnston was born in Burma, where his father was a banker in Mandalay. Brought up as a Roman Catholic, he was educated at Ampleforth College, where he became friends with Basil Hume.

== Military career ==
In 1941, Johnston joined the 4th Battalion, Grenadier Guards, then being converted from infantry into an armoured formation with Churchill tanks. He commanded a squadron and then a troop. His troop was part of a diversion force posted to mislead the Germans into expecting an invasion of the Pas de Calais, so he landed in Normandy six weeks after D-Day. His battalion advanced through Belgium and the Netherlands, entering German territory near Minden. He sustained head injuries from a Panzerfaust attack on 21 April 1945, and he was hospitalised in Brussels. After convalescing and some leave, he rejoined his unit after VE Day in Schleswig-Holstein. He was awarded the Military Cross for his actions on the advance to the Elbe, and remained in the army after demobilisation. He wrote of his war-time experiences in his Memoirs of a Tank Troop Leader.

In 1949, Johnston married the Honourable Elizabeth Hardinge, the younger daughter of Alexander Hardinge, 2nd Baron Hardinge of Penshurst, who was Private Secretary to the Sovereign from 1936 to 1943. Johnston first met his future wife at Welbeck College, where she was visiting her older sister who was married to another officer. She was later a magistrate in Windsor. Together, they had a son and a daughter. She died in 1995.

Johnston was brigade major of the Household Division from October 1959 to August 1962, and he led the royal procession at Trooping the Colour in 1962, although he quickly had to be taught to ride a horse first. He commanded the 1st Battalion, Grenadier Guards in Germany, and retired from the British Army as a lieutenant colonel in July 1964. On 7 September 1958, he appeared on the television show What's My Line?.

== Courtier ==
On leaving the army, Johnston joined the Lord Chamberlain's Office as Assistant Comptroller. He was appointed an Extra Equerry to the Queen in 1965. Until 1968, the Lord Chamberlain's duties included the licensing (and censoring) of plays and theatres under the Theatres Act 1843. He described the historic role of the Lord Chamberlain's Office in this area in his 1990 book, The Lord Chamberlain's Blue Pencil. Amongst his other duties, he helped to organise the celebrations of The Queen's Silver Jubilee in 1977.

Johnston was promoted to Comptroller in 1981, replacing Lieutenant Colonel Sir Eric Penn shortly before the 1981 royal wedding of Charles, Prince of Wales and Lady Diana Spencer. As Comptroller, he took charge of protocol, state visits, investitures, garden parties, the State Opening of Parliament, royal weddings and royal funerals, administration of the royal palaces and the Royal Collection, the Central Chancery of Knighthood, the Lords-in-Waiting, the Gentlemen at Arms, the Yeomen of the Guard, the Royal Company of Archers, the Queen's Bargemaster, the Royal Watermen, and supervised swan upping. He also controlled royal styles and titles, matters of precedence, granting of Royal Warrants, and licensing the use of the royal arms. On one occasion, when dressed in the uniform of the Grenadier Guards, he stood prominently beside The Queen on Horse Guards Parade, holding her handbag.

Amongst his other interests, Johnston was president of Hearing Dogs for the Deaf.

For many years, Johnston occupied a grace and favour cottage in Home Park, Windsor. He bought a cottage in west Wales in the 1970s, which he used as a holiday home. He was appointed a Member of the Royal Victorian Order in 1971, advanced to Commander of the Royal Victorian Order in 1977, and made a Knight Commander of the Royal Victorian Order in the 1981 Birthday Honours. He was appointed a Knight Grand Cross of the Royal Victorian Order in 1987, the year in which he retired. He was succeeded as Comptroller by Lieutenant Colonel George Alston-Roberts-West, and moved to a house in Windsor Great Park.
