= Lord Lieutenant of Kirkcudbright =

Ceremonial officer in Kirkcudbright, Scotland

This is a list of people who have served as Lord-Lieutenant of Kirkcudbright, part of the Dumfries and Galloway council area of south-west Scotland. Prior to 1975 the lieutenancy corresponded to the historic county of Kirkcudbrightshire. Since 1975 the lieutenancy area has been the slightly smaller Stewartry district, corresponding to the local government district of Stewartry established in 1975 and abolished in 1996. From 1975 until 1996 the title was the "Lord-Lieutenant for Dumfries and Galloway Region (District of Stewartry)". In 1996 the title was changed to "Lord-Lieutenant for the Stewartry of Kirkcudbright".

- George Stewart, 8th Earl of Galloway 5 November 1794 – 1803
- John Stewart, 7th Earl of Galloway 28 June 1803 – 13 November 1806
- Thomas Douglas, 5th Earl of Selkirk 24 March 1807 – 8 April 1820
- George Stewart, 8th Earl of Galloway 10 June 1820 – 1828
- Randolph Stewart, 9th Earl of Galloway 9 July 1828 – 1845
- Dunbar James Douglas, 6th Earl of Selkirk 29 May 1845 – 11 April 1885
- Marmaduke Constable-Maxwell, 11th Lord Herries of Terregles 26 May 1885 – 6 October 1908
- Lt Col Robert Francis Dudgeon 9 November 1908 – 4 October 1932
- Randolph Algernon Ronald Stewart, 12th Earl of Galloway 17 November 1932 – 1975
- Col Gordon Guthrie Malcolm Bachelor 7 September 1975 – 16 November 1976
- Walter John Macdonald Ross 1 February 1977 – 29 July 1982
- Charles St Clair, 17th Lord Sinclair 24 November 1982 – 1989
- Sir Michael Herries 26 July 1989 – 6 May 1995
- Sir Norman Arthur 16 February 1996 – 2006
- Sir Malcolm Ross 2 March 2006 – 27 October 2018
- Elizabeth Patricia Gilroy 5 November 2018 – 2021
- Matthew Murray Kennedy St Clair, 18th Lord Sinclair 29 July 2021 –
