= Henry Dalzell-Payne =

General in the British Army

Major-General Henry Dalzell-Payne CBE
- Born: Henry Salusbury Legh Dalzell Payne; 9 August 1929
- Died: 23 January 2018 (aged 88)
- Military career
- Allegiance: United Kingdom
- Branch: British Army
- Service years: 1949–1981
- Rank: Major-General
- Commands: 6th Armoured Brigade; 3rd Armoured Division
- Conflicts: Operation Banner
- Awards: Commander of the Order of the British Empire

Major-General Henry "Harry" Salusbury Legh Dalzell Payne CBE (9 August 1929 – 23 January 2018) was a British Army officer who commanded 3rd Armoured Division.

== Military career ==
Dalzell Payne attended Royal Military Academy Sandhurst, where he was awarded the King's Medal as a result of achieving the highest scores in military, practical and academic studies. was commissioned into the 7th Queen's Own Hussars in 1949 as an armoured corps officer. He served as a regiment Adjutant in Hong Kong in 1954 before joining the military staff of the Sultan of Oman's Armed Forces, for which he was awarded an MBE. Further appointments included Brigade Major of 20th Armoured Infantry Brigade, and as an instructor at Princess Royal Barracks, Deepcut.

In the early 1970s he transferred to the Ministry of Defence to join the department with responsibility for Northern Ireland, playing a role in the department's response to incidents during The Troubles, including Bloody Sunday in 1972. He later gave evidence to the Saville Inquiry to state that the Army had no intention of killing the marchers.

He was appointed Commander of 6th Armoured Brigade and awarded a CBE in 1973, before moving to Bielefeld, Germany to become Chief of Staff at Ist (British) Corps in 1976. He was promoted to major-general in 1978, commanding the 3rd Armoured Division.

== Resignation ==
In 1979, it was announced that he would become Assistant Chief of the General Staff. However, during his move back to the United Kingdom, he was investigated by the Military police for suspicion that he had avoided tax on port that he had intended to bring back to Britain. While no charges were ultimately filed, the Army Board asked him to resign his commission due both to the adverse publicity and also to the revelation that he had significant debts.

== Later life ==
After his resignation, Dalzell Payne moved to the United States, spending 15 years working in New York and Boston. In 1984, he accepted a directorship with the National Securities and Research Corporation, a mutual fund. He would retain his place on the board when the company was absorbed by Phoenix Home Life Mutual Insurance Company in 1993.

== Family ==
He was married to Serena Helen Gourlay, with whom he had two daughters.

Military offices
Preceded by Michael Walsh	General Officer Commanding the 3rd Armoured Division; 1978–1980	Succeeded by Norman Arthur
