= Lord Chamberlain's Office =

Department of the Royal Household

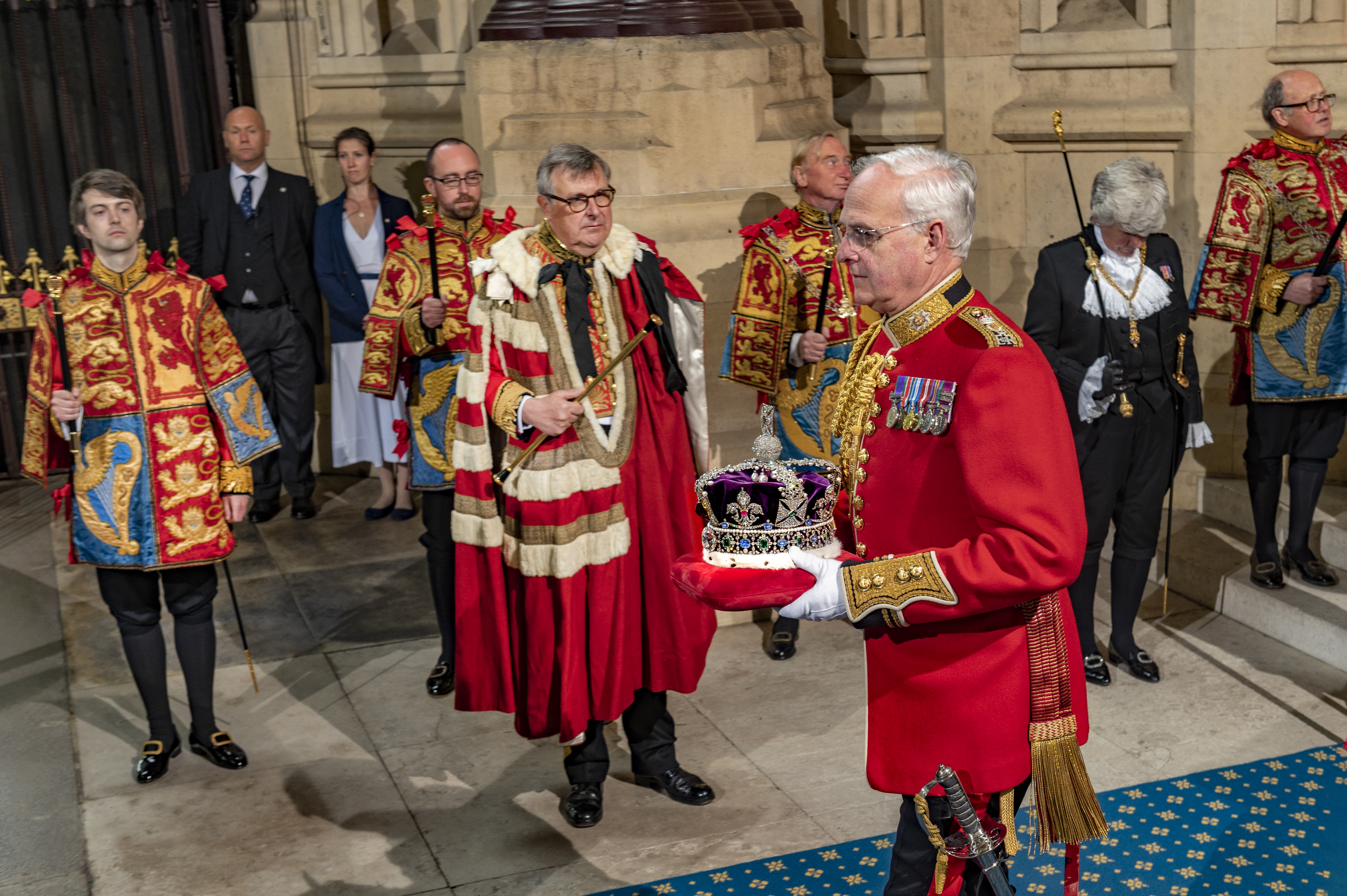
Lt-Col. Michael Vernon, Comptroller of the Lord Chamberlain's Office, whose ceremonial responsibilities included conveying the Imperial State Crown to and from the Palace of Westminster for the State Opening of Parliament

The Lord Chamberlain's Office is a department within the British Royal Household. It is concerned with matters such as protocol, state visits, investitures, garden parties, royal weddings and funerals. For example, in April 2005 it organised the wedding of Charles, Prince of Wales and Camilla Parker Bowles. It is also responsible for authorising use of the Royal Arms and other royal symbols.

As the Lord Chamberlain is a part-time position, the day-to-day work of the Office is conducted by the Comptroller of the Lord Chamberlain's Office.

== List of comptrollers ==
- Sir Spencer Ponsonby-Fane GCB ISO (1857–1901)
- Major General Sir Arthur Ellis GCVO CSI (1901–1907)
- Brigadier General Sir Douglas Dawson GCVO KCB CMG (1907–1920)
- Colonel The Hon. Sir George Crichton GCVO (1920–1936)
- Lieutenant-Colonel Lord Nugent GCVO MC (1936–1960)
- Brigadier Sir Norman Gwatkin GCVO KCMG DSO (1960–1964)
- Lieutenant Colonel Sir Eric Penn GCVO OBE MC (1964–1981)
- Lieutenant Colonel Sir John Johnston GCVO MC (1981–1987)
- Lieutenant Colonel George Alston-Roberts-West CVO (1987–1990)
- Lieutenant Colonel Sir Malcolm Ross GCVO OBE (1991–2005)
- Lieutenant Colonel Sir Andrew Ford GCVO (2006–2018)
- Lieutenant Colonel Sir Michael Vernon KCVO (2019–2025)
- Colonel Edwyn Launders MBE (2025–)

== Theatre censorship ==
The Lord Chamberlain's Office had a more significant role (under the Theatres Act 1843) in British society prior to 1968, as it was the official censor for virtually all theatre performed in Britain. Commercial theatre owners were generally satisfied by the safety this arrangement gave them; so long as they presented only licensed plays they were effectively immune from prosecution for any offence a play might cause. There were campaigns by playwrights, however, in opposition to the Lord Chamberlain's censorship, such as those involving J. M. Barrie in 1909 and 1911. Some plays were not licensed in the 1930s, during the period of appeasement, because they were critical of the regime in Nazi Germany and it was feared that allowing certain plays to be performed might alienate what was still thought of as a friendly government. This included Terence Rattigan's Follow My Leader, which was submitted to the Lord Chamberlain's office in 1938 but was not granted a license due to its farcical depiction of the German government "not being in the best interests of the country". It was not granted a license until 1940 following the end of appeasement. Rowland Baring, 2nd Earl of Cromer, then Lord Chamberlain, consulted the Foreign Office regularly and sometimes the German Embassy. In the latter case, the submissions were intended to be read by a "friendly German".

By the 1960s, there were many playwrights and producers who wished to produce controversial works such as Lady Chatterley's Lover. Theatre companies such as the Royal Court Theatre came into open conflict with the Lord Chamberlain's Office. Sometimes they would resort to such measures as declaring themselves private clubs for the performance of certain plays. Edward Bond's Saved and John Osborne's A Patriot for Me played a large role in the build up to the Theatres Act 1968. The Lord Chamberlain's Office technically had jurisdiction over private performances, but had generally avoided getting involved with bona-fide private clubs until Saved. While they had cause for prosecution, there was a fear that this would call into question theatre censorship as a whole. This is precisely what happened after the Royal Court Theatre was prosecuted. Director William Gaskill was discharged and the company were fined but the publicity surrounding the case called into question the necessity of the Lord Chamberlain's role in theatre. The 1966 Joint Select Committee was set up to discuss possible changes to the Theatres Act following the dissatisfaction with how theatre censorship was being handled. It included eight representatives of the House of Lords, eight MPs, and witnesses of varying theatrical backgrounds, including Peter Hall. The committee met between 1966 and 1967 over the course of sixteen meetings and it eventually resulted in the abolition of the role of official censor in the Theatres Act 1968.

== Bibliography ==
- Johnston, John (1990). The Lord Chamberlain's Blue Pencil. Hodder & Stoughton. ISBN 0-340-52529-0.
- Nicholson, Steve (2015). The Censorship of British Drama 1900-1968, Volume One 1900-1932. University of Exeter Press. ISBN 9780859896382.
