= Order of Saint John (chartered 1888) =

British royal order of chivalry

Most Venerable Order of the Hospital of St John of Jerusalem
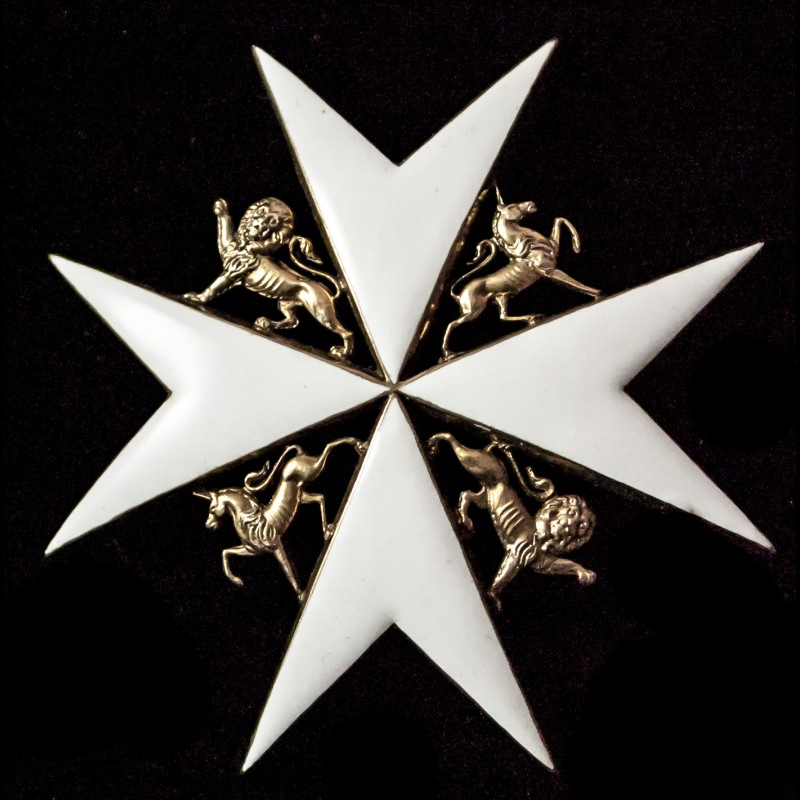
- Breast star of a Knight of Grace of the Order of St John
- Type: Order of chivalry
- Established: 1888
- Motto: Pro Fide Pro Utilitate Hominum
- Eligibility: Service to the order
- Status: Extant
- Sovereign Head: Charles III
- Grand Prior: The Duke of Gloucester
- Lord Prior: Mark Compton
- Grades: Bailiff/Dame Grand Cross (GCStJ); Knight/Dame of Justice or Knight/Dame of Grace (KStJ/DStJ); Commander/Chaplain (CStJ/ChStJ); Officer (OStJ); Member (MStJ)

Precedence
- Next (higher): Dependent on State
- Next (lower): Dependent on State
- Ribbon of the order

The Most Venerable Order of the Hospital of Saint John of Jerusalem (French: l'Ordre très vénérable de l'Hôpital de Saint-Jean de Jérusalem), (Note: For use in Canada, in accordance with the country's policy of official bilingualism.) commonly known as the Order of St John, and also known as St John International, is an order of chivalry constituted in 1888 by royal charter from Queen Victoria and dedicated to St John the Baptist.

The order traces its origins back to the Knights Hospitaller in the Middle Ages, the oldest surviving chivalric order which is generally considered to be founded in Jerusalem in 1099, which was later known as the Order of Malta. A faction of them emerged in France in the 1820s and moved to Britain in the early 1830s, where, after operating under a succession of grand priors and different names, it became associated with the founding in 1882 of the St John Ophthalmic Hospital near the old city of Jerusalem and the St John Ambulance Brigade in 1887.

The order is found throughout the Commonwealth of Nations, Hong Kong, the Republic of Ireland, and the United States of America, with the worldwide mission "to prevent and relieve sickness and injury, and to act to enhance the health and well-being of people anywhere in the world." The order's approximately 25,000 members, known as confrères, are mostly of the Protestant faith, though those of other Christian denominations, as well as adherents of other religions are accepted into the order. Except via appointment to certain government or ecclesiastical offices in some realms, membership is by invitation only and individuals may not petition for admission.

The Order of St John is perhaps best known for the health organisations it founded and continues to run, including St John Ambulance and St John Eye Hospital Group. As with the order, the memberships and work of these organisations are not constricted by denomination or religion. The order is a constituent member of the Alliance of the Orders of Saint John of Jerusalem. Its headquarters are in London and it is a registered charity under English law.

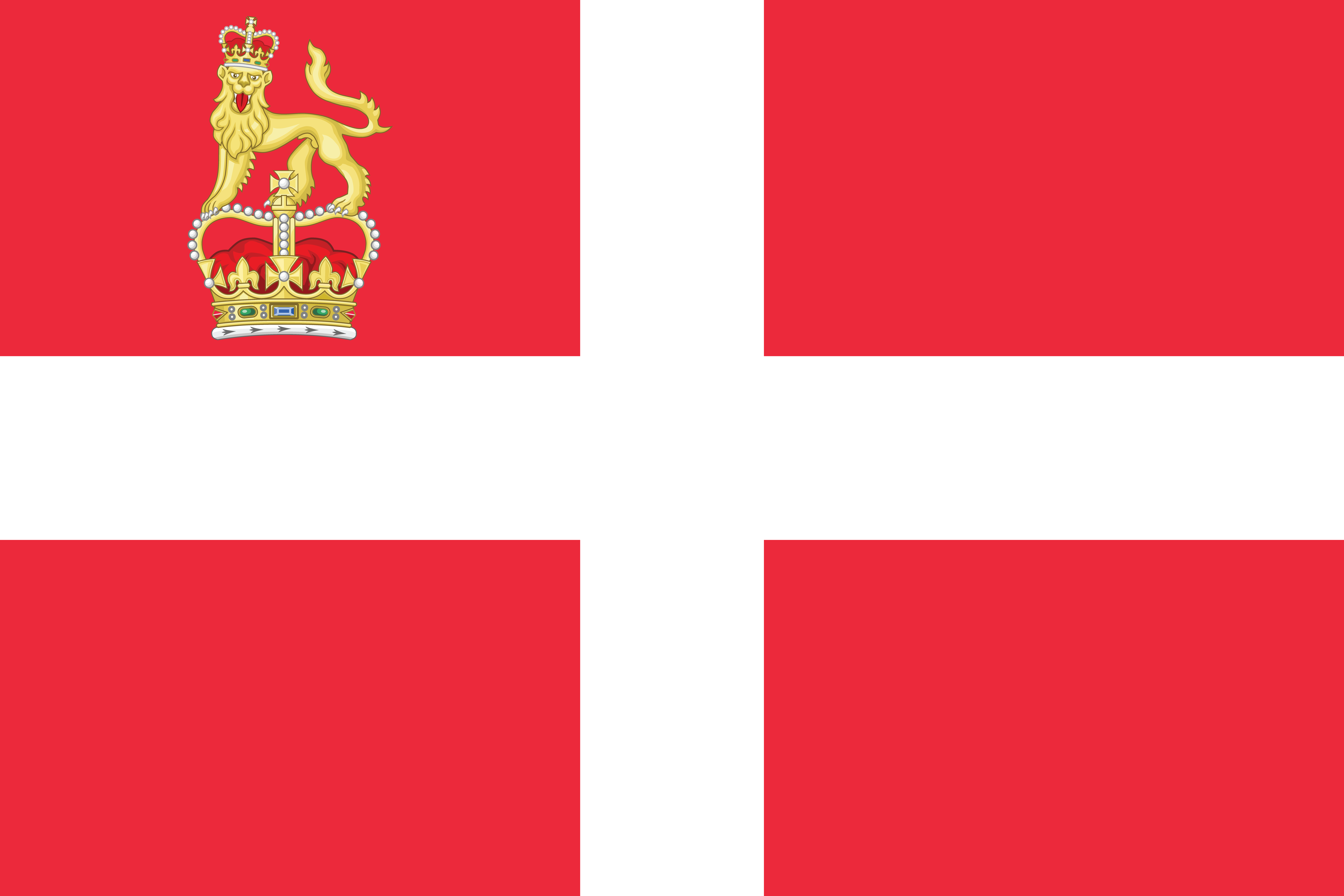
Flag of the Order of St John

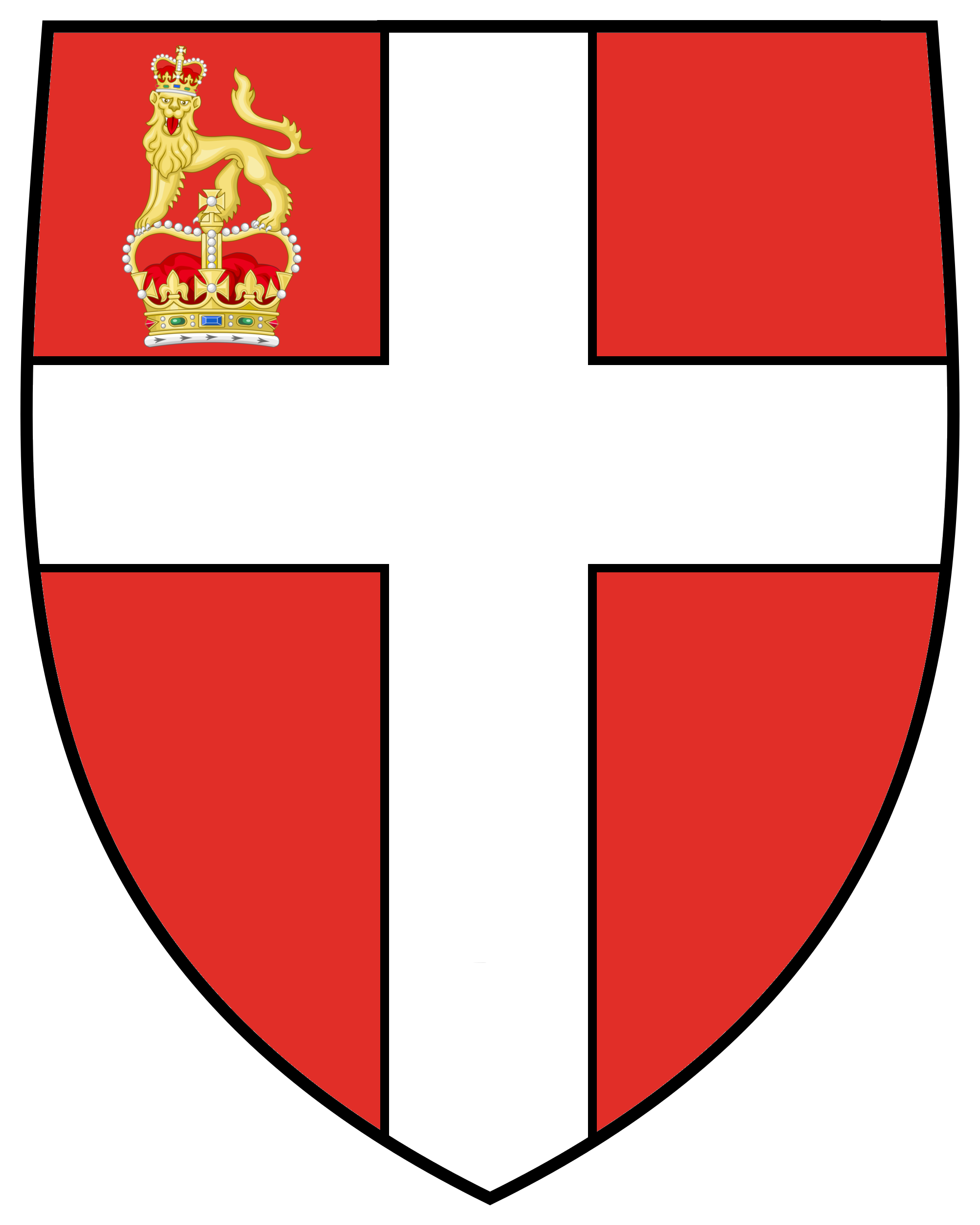
Arms of the Order of St John

== History ==
=== Emergence ===
In the 1820s, those Knights of Malta residing in France granted knighthoods to certain people of various Christian denominations who provided support to the Order in England.

In 1823, the Council of the French Langues—a French state-backed and hosted faction of the Order of Malta (Sovereign Military Hospitaller Order of St John of Jerusalem of Rhodes and of Malta)—sought to raise through private subscription sufficient money to restore a territorial base for the Order of Malta and aid the Greek War of Independence. This was to be achieved by issuing bonds in London to form a mercenary army of demobilised British soldiers using readily available, cheap war surplus. A deal transferring various islands to the Order of Malta, including Rhodes when captured, was struck with the Greek rebels, but, ultimately, the attempt to raise money failed when details leaked to the press, the French monarchy withdrew its backing of the Council, and the bankers refused the loan. The Council was re-organised and the Marquis de Sainte-Croix du Molay (previously number two of the Council and a former Order of Malta administrator in Spain) became its head. In June 1826, a second attempt was made to raise money to restore a Mediterranean homeland for the Order when Philippe de Castellane, a French Knight of Malta, was appointed by the Council to negotiate with supportive persons in Britain. Scotsman Donald Currie was in 1827 given the authority to raise £240,000. Anyone who subscribed to the project and all commissioned officers of the mercenary army were offered the opportunity of being appointed knights of the Order. Few donations were attracted, though, and the Greek War of Independence was won without the help of the knights of the Council of the French Langues. Castellane and Currie were then allowed by the French Council to form the Council of the English Langue, which was inaugurated on 12 January 1831, under the executive control of Alejandro, conde de Mortara, a Spanish aristocrat. It was headquartered at what Mortara called the "Auberge of St John", St John's Gate, Clerkenwell. This was the Old Jerusalem Tavern, a public house occupying what had once been a gatehouse to the ancient Clerkenwell Priory, the medieval Grand Priory of the Knights Hospitaller, otherwise known as the Knights of Saint John. The creation of the langue has been regarded either as a revival of the Knights Hospitaller or the establishment of a new order.

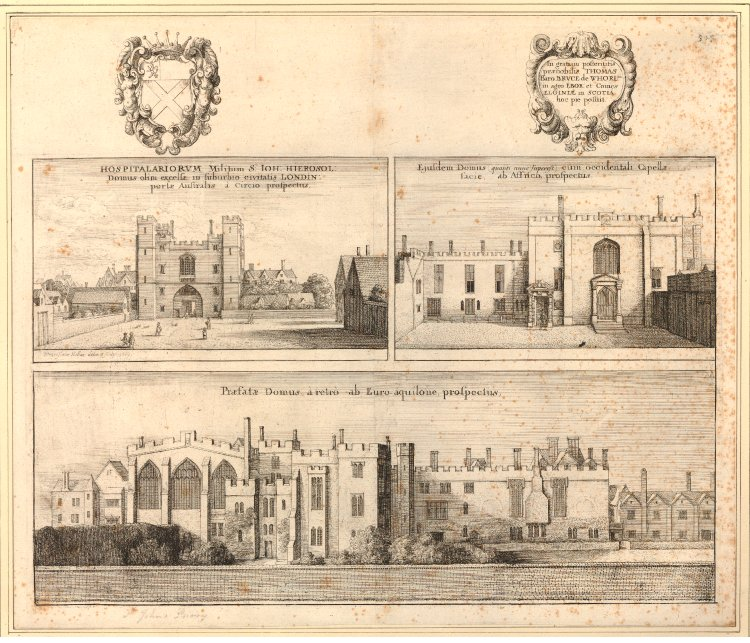
Priory of St John at Clerkenwell, London in 1661, by Wenceslaus Hollar

The Reverend Sir Robert Peat, the absentee perpetual curate of St Lawrence, Brentford, in Middlesex, and one of the many former chaplains to Prince George (Prince Regent and later King George IV), had been recruited by the Council as a member of the society in 1830. On 29 January 1831, in the presence of Philip de Castellane and the Agent-General of the French Langues, Peat was elected prior ad interim. Then, on the grounds that he had been selling knighthoods, Peat and other English members of the organisation expelled Mortara, with the backing of the Council of the French Langues, leading to the existence of two competing English chivalric groups between early 1832 and Mortara's disappearance in 1837. On 24 February 1834, three years after becoming prior ad interim, in order to publicly reaffirm his claim to the office of Prior and in the hope of reviving a charter of Queen Mary I dealing with the original English branch of the Order of Malta, Peat took the oath de fideli administratione in the Court of the King's Bench, before the Lord Chief Justice. Peat was thus credited as being the first Grand Prior of the association, but in January 1919 "W.B.H." wrote to the journal Notes & Queries: "His name is not in the knights' lists, and he was never 'Prior in the Sovereign Order of St. John of Jerusalem': he became an ordinary member of that Order on Nov. 11, 1830."

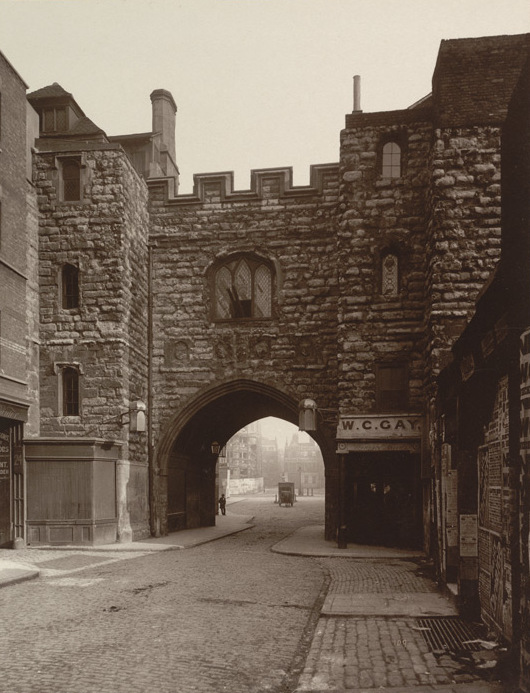
St John's Gate, London, in 1880

Sir Robert Peat died in April 1837 and Sir Henry Dymoke was appointed Grand Prior and re-established contact with the knights in France and Germany, into which the group had by that time expanded. However, until the late 1830s, only the English arm of the organisation had considered itself to be a grand priory and langue of the Order of St John, having never been recognised as such by the established order. Dymoke sought to rectify this by seeking acknowledgement from the headquarters of the Roman Catholic Sovereign Military Order of Malta, but its then Lieutenant of the Grand Master, Filippo di Colloredo-Mels, refused the request. In response to this rebuff, the English body declared itself to be the Sovereign Order of St John in England, under the title The Sovereign and Illustrious Order of Saint John of Jerusalem, Anglia, thereby emphasising the order's independence and claim to direct and continuous succession from the Order of St John that was established in the 11th century. This new entity grew its membership over the ensuing three decades and, in 1861, William Montagu, 7th Duke of Manchester, agreed to become its grand prior. Additionally, an associated national hospitaller organisation was formed with a corps of ambulances.

=== Order of St John of Jerusalem in Great Britain ===
In 1871, the Duke of Manchester instituted a new constitution, which again changed the order's name, offering the more modest Order of Saint John of Jerusalem in England, abandoning the pretension to the title of "Sovereign Order". Five years later, Princess Alexandra was appointed a Lady of Justice, and this was followed by her husband, Albert Edward, Prince of Wales (later King Edward VII) becoming a Knight. Two years later, Sir Edmund Lechmere bought St John's Gate as the order's headquarters; the property was initially leased from Lechmere, before the order acquired the freehold in 1887. In 1877, the order established various St John Ambulance associations in major railway centres and mining districts, so that railway men and colliers could learn how to treat victims of accidents with first aid; in 1882, the Grand Priory founded a hospice and ophthalmic dispensary in Jerusalem (known today as the St John of Jerusalem Eye Hospital Group); and, by 1887, had established the St John Ambulance Brigade, which undertook practical and life-saving work.

The name given in 1888, when the order was first constituted as the present order of chivalry by Queen Victoria's royal charter, was Grand Priory of the Order of the Hospital of Saint John of Jerusalem in England. This was changed by the royal charter of 1926 to the Grand Priory in the British Realm of the Venerable Order of the Hospital of Saint John of Jerusalem and further in 1936 to the Grand Priory in the British Realm of the Most Venerable Order of the Hospital of Saint John of Jerusalem. In 1961, it played a role, together with the Protestant Continental branches of the original Order of Saint John (the "Johanniter Orders" in Germany, the Netherlands, Sweden, and elsewhere), in the establishment of the Alliance of the Orders of Saint John of Jerusalem and thereafter finally received (through an agreement in 1963) collateral recognition by the Order of Malta. Its most recent royal charter was granted in 1955, with a supplemental charter issued in 1974, recognising the worldwide scope of the organisation by setting its present name. In 1999, the order received special consultative status from the United Nations Economic and Social Council.

== Structure ==
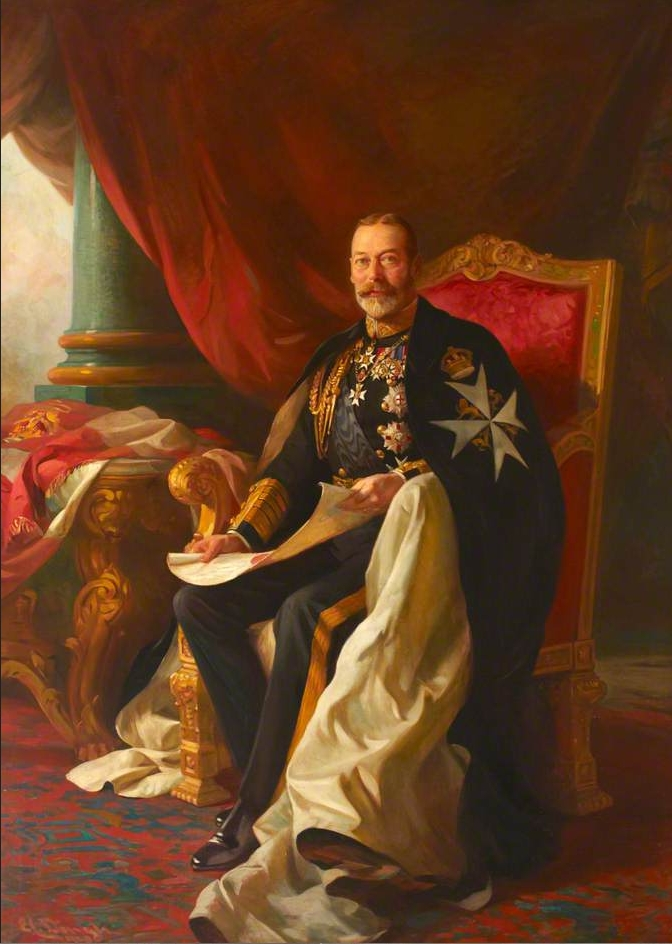
King George V, Emperor of India, Sovereign Head of the Order from 1910 until his death in 1936

=== Officers ===
Charles III is at the apex of the Order of St John as its Sovereign Head, followed by the Grand Prior—since 1975, Prince Richard, Duke of Gloucester. He, along with the four or five other Great Officers—the Lord Prior of St John, who acts as the lieutenant of and deputy to the Grand Prior; the Prelate, who is an Anglican bishop; the Deputy Lord Prior (or more than one depending on the Grand Prior's needs), who acts accordingly as a lieutenant and deputy to the Lord Prior; and the Sub-Prelate, who has interests in the commanderies and associations of the organisation—as well as the Priors and Chancellors of each of the order's eight priories and the Hospitaller make up the Grand Council. On recommendation of that body, the Grand Prior appoints all the Grand Officers, besides himself, and may also appoint members of either Grade I or Grade II as other officers, known as the Principal Officers, such as the Secretary-General and Honorary Officers, such as the Genealogist, (currently Peter O'Donoghue, York Herald) and Director of Ceremonies, who all hold office for a period not exceeding three years; the latter position currently being held by Alan Cook, a former Essex Police chief inspector on behalf of Major James Kelly. The Grand Prior may also appoint a Secretary of the Order, who holds office at the pleasure of the Grand Prior or until resignation. A subset of the Grand Council is the Honours and Awards Committee, which considers all recommendations for appointment or promotion into the grade of Bailiff or Dame Grand Cross, appointment or promotion into any grade of a person not resident within any priory's territory, and advises the Grand Council in respect of the award of its Lifesaving Medal and Service Medal.

=== Membership ===
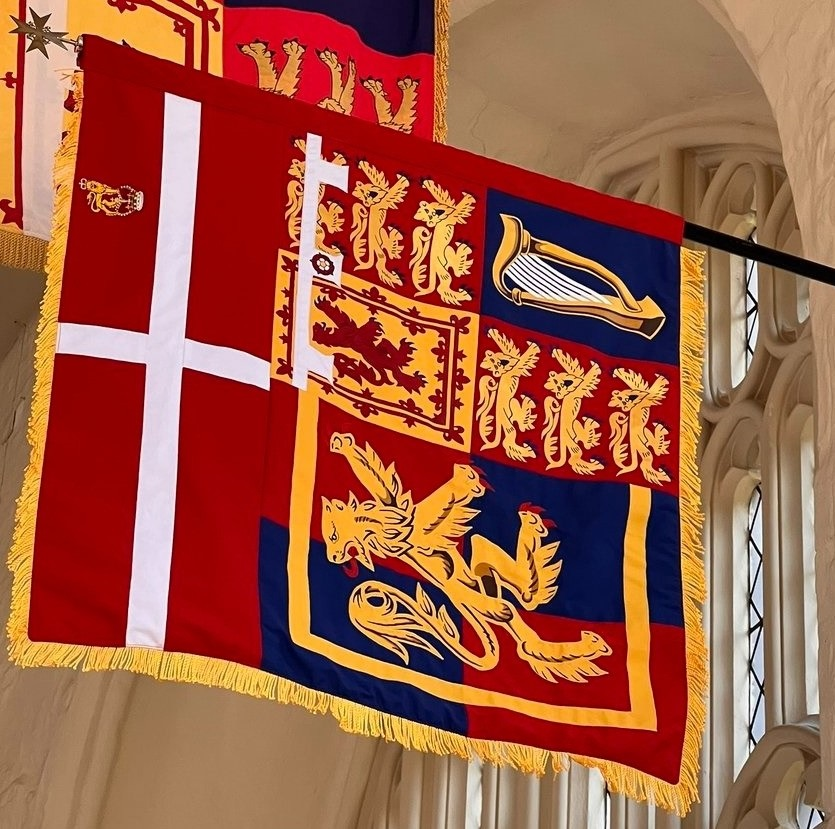
Banner of Sophie, Duchess of Edinburgh, at the Priory Church of the Order of St John

Until 2007, Members (MStJ) were known in the United Kingdom as Serving Brothers and Serving Sisters.

Admission to the Order is strictly by invitation only. Existing members and County Priory Groups put forward names of individuals who have shown a commitment to voluntary or humanitarian service. A vetting and approval process is carried out by a regional Priory. A final list of new members is submitted to King Charles III for his formal approval by the royal sign-manual. After this, the Privy Council places a notice of the appointments in The Gazette, and the new Members receive their insignia at an investiture ceremony.

The Sovereign Head confirms all appointments to the order as he, in his absolute discretion, shall think fit, although the constitution of the Order imposes some limitations: the maximum number of members is set at 35,000, and new members must be over the age of eighteen. Recommendations are made by the Grand Council and those selected have generally acted in such a manner as to strengthen the spirit of mankind—as reflected in the order's first motto, Pro Fide—and to encourage and promote humanitarian and charitable work aiding those in sickness, suffering, and/or danger—as reflected in the order's other motto, Pro Utilitate Hominum.

To be inducted, new members must recite the organisation's declaration:

I do solemnly declare that I will be faithful and obedient to The Order of St John and its Sovereign Head as far as it is consistent with my duty to my [sovereign/president] and to my country; that I will do everything in my power to uphold its dignity and support its charitable works; and that I will endeavour always to uphold the aims of this Christian order and to conduct myself as a person of honour.

Those who are Christians additionally recite the following:

I solemnly declare that I personally profess the Christian faith and accordingly that I believe in God the Father, God the Son and God the Holy Spirit.

Notwithstanding the order's promotion of Christian values of charity and its official stance that the order has a "Christian character", its Grand Council has since 1999 affirmed that "profession of the Christian Faith should not be a condition of membership of the Order." The issue of the order's Christian character and the issue of "inclusive membership" was dealt with in the Grand Council's Pro Fide Report in 2005, in which it was said that the order's life is shaped by Christian faith and values, but that "[r]ather than the emphasis being primarily upon 'spiritual beliefs or doctrine' it is on works of mercy rendered through St John". Therefore, while the Great Officers are required to profess the Christian faith, the same is "not an essential condition of membership" and "[t]he onus is on the man or woman who is invited to the privilege of membership to decide whether he or she can with a good conscience promise to be faithful to the stated aims and purposes of this Christian lay order of chivalry." On the subject of inclusive membership, the report stated "Christian hospitality is a criterion which can be applied to the Order's relationships to persons of other religious faiths", and "the Order needs to be characterized by a hospitable disposition towards other faith traditions while holding fast to its own origins and foundational identity in Christian faith."

=== List of grand priors ===
Since the Order's Royal Charter of 1888, the Grand Prior has been appointed by the Sovereign Head and has always been a member of the British royal family.

- The Reverend Sir Robert Peat (1831–1837)
- Sir Henry Dymoke (1838–1847)
- Lieutenant Colonel Sir Charles Montolieu Lamb (1847–1860)
- Rear Admiral Sir Alexander Arbuthnott (1860–1861)
- William Montagu, 7th Duke of Manchester (1861–1888)
- Albert Edward, Prince of Wales (1888–1901)
- George, Prince of Wales (1901–1910)
- Prince Arthur, Duke of Connaught and Strathearn (1910–1939)
- Prince Henry, Duke of Gloucester (1939–1974)
- Prince Richard, Duke of Gloucester (1975–present)

=== List of priors ===
From 1888 until 1943, this office was styled "Sub Prior" and from 1943 until 1950 it was named "Prior."

=== Sub-priors ===
- Prince Albert Victor, Duke of Clarence and Avondale (1888–1892)
- Prince George, Duke of Cornwall and York (1893–1901)
- John Hope, 1st Marquess of Linlithgow (1906–1907)
- Vacant (1908–1910)
- Henry Holland, 1st Viscount Knutsford (1910–1914)
- Robert Windsor-Clive, 1st Earl of Plymouth (1915–1923)
- Aldred Lumley, 10th Earl of Scarbrough (1923–1943)

=== Priors ===
- Ivor Windsor-Clive, 2nd Earl of Plymouth (1943)
- George Villiers, 6th Earl of Clarendon (1943–1946)
- John Loder, 2nd Baron Wakehurst (1947–1950)

=== Lord priors ===
- John Loder, 2nd Baron Wakehurst (1950–1969)
- Harold Caccia, Baron Caccia (1969–1981)
- Sir Maurice Dorman (1982–1985)
- Alan Cathcart, 6th Earl Cathcart (1986–1987)
- Ralph Grey, Baron Grey of Naunton (1988–1990)
- Samuel Vestey, 3rd Baron Vestey (1991–2001)
- Colonel Eric Barry (2002–2008)
- Anthony Mellows (2008–2014)
- Neil Conn (2014–2015)
- Sir Malcolm Ross (2016–2019)
- Mark Compton (2019–present), present at the 2023 Coronation.

=== Grades ===
After the officers of the Order follow members, who are divided into six hierarchical grades, all having accordant post-nominal letters. Grade I is limited to only the members of the Grand Council plus no more than 21 others, though royalty and heads of state of any country may be appointed as a Bailiff or Dame Grand Cross without counting towards the complement. All Priors, should they not already be in the grade or higher, are appointed Knight or Dame upon their assignment. Knights and Dames of Justice, along with all Bailiffs and Dames Grand Cross, formerly were entitled to nominate two personal Esquires, just as each Knight or Dame of Grace could nominate one personal Esquire, subject to the Grand Council's scrutiny.

Grades of the Order of St John
Grade	Grade I	Grade II	Grade III	Grade IV	Grade V
Title (English)	Bailiff/Dame Grand Cross	Knights/Dames of Justice or Grace	Commander/Chaplain	Officer	Member
Title (French)	Bailli/Dame grand-croix	Chevalier/Dame de justice ou de grâce	Commandeur	Officier	Membre
Post-nominal letters	GCStJ	KStJ/DStJ	CStJ/ChStJ	OStJ	MStJ

Canadian Governor General Roland Michener's arms, depicting his St John insignia appended right

Knights and Dames receive the accolade from the Grand Prior when they are touched on the shoulder with a sword and are given their robes and insignia. However, jurisdiction dependent, post-nominal letters of the order are not used outside the organisation itself, and a Knight and Dame may not use the prefix Sir or Dame, though they may request from their local heraldic authority a personal coat of arms, should they not already be entitled to use one, and have it adorned with emblems of the Order of St John. Bailiffs and Dames Grand Cross additionally have the right to be granted heraldic supporters for life. Further, membership only grants precedence within the Order, which is graded as follows:

1. The Sovereign Head
2. The Grand Prior
3. The Lord Prior of St John
4. The Prior of a Priory or the Knight or Dame Commander of a Commandery when within the territory of the establishment
5. The Prelate of the Order
6. The Deputy Lord Prior or the Deputy Lord Priors and if more than one by seniority in their grade
7. The Sub-Prior of the Order
8. Former Great Officers
9. Bailiffs and Dames Grand Cross
10. The Prior of a Priory or the Knight or Dame Commander of a Commandery outside the territory of the establishment
11. Members of the Grand Council not included above by seniority in their grade
12. The Principal Officers by seniority of their office
13. The Sub-Prelates and the Honorary Sub-Prelates
14. The Hospitaller of the Order
15. Knights and Dames
16. Chaplains
17. Commanders
18. Officers
19. Members (formerly Serving Brothers and Serving Sisters)
20. Priory Esquires (Priory Esquires are not members of the Order)

Precedence within each grade is dictated by date of appointment, save for those in Grade I who are either a head of state or royal, in which case they all precede other members in their grade as follows:

1. Members of the Sovereign's family
2. Heads of state from the Commonwealth of Nations
3. Foreign heads of state
4. Members of other Commonwealth royal families
5. Members of foreign royal families

Awards are presented within the order: the Priory Vote of Thanks, the St John's Provincial/Territorial Commendation (in Canada), the Life Saving Award (Without Risk) in Silver, and the Service Medal of the Most Venerable Order of the Hospital of St John of Jerusalem.

=== Priories and commanderies ===
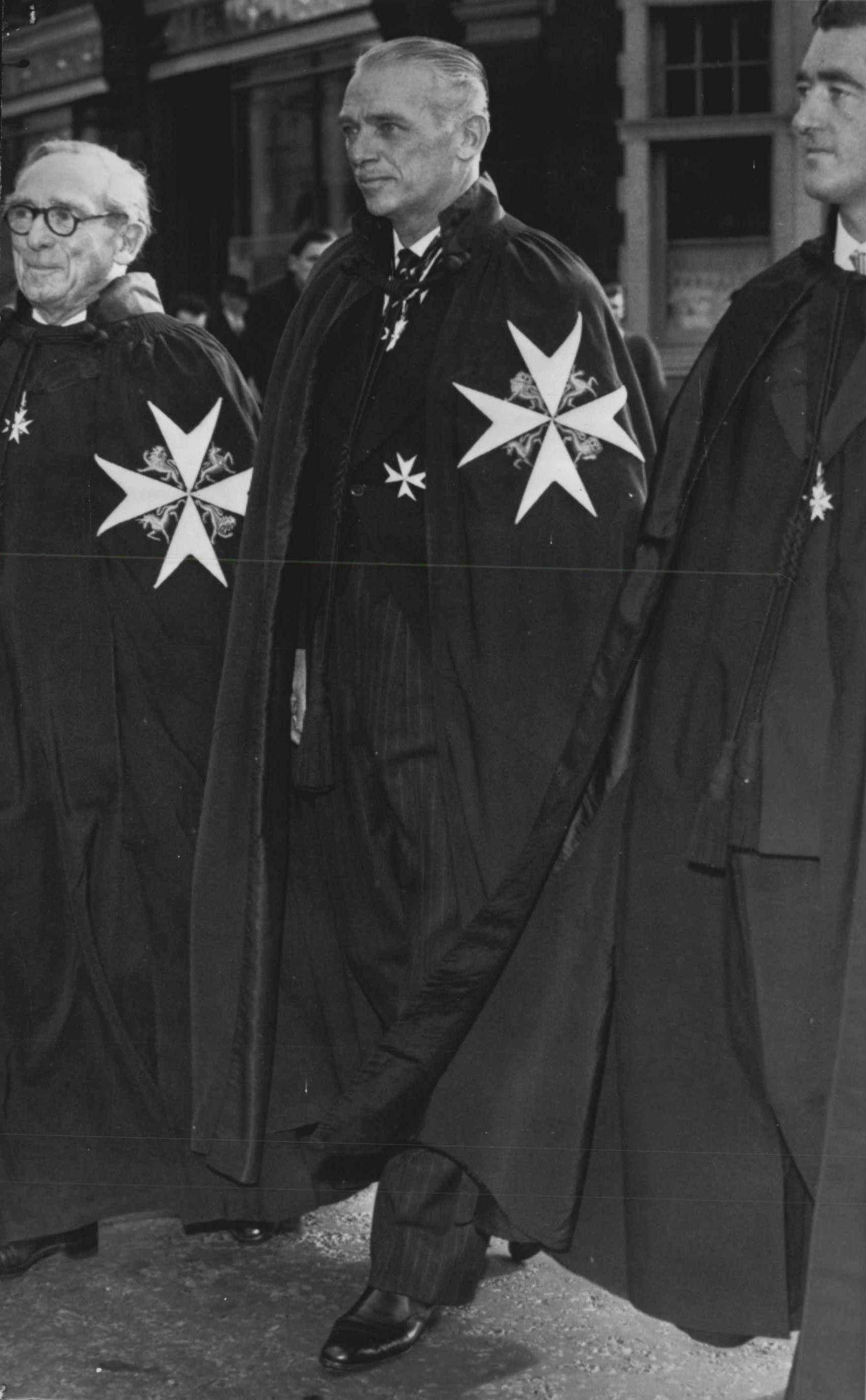
Douglas Fairbanks Jr., robed as a Knight of Justice of St John (1958)

Following constitutional changes made in 1999, the Priory of England and The Islands was established (including the Commandery of Ards in Northern Ireland) alongside the existing Priories of Wales, Scotland, Canada, Australia (including the Commandery of Western Australia), New Zealand, South Africa, and the United States. In 2013, the Priory of Kenya and in 2014 the Priory of Singapore were formed. Each is governed by a prior and a priory chapter. Commanderies, governed by a Knight or Dame Commander and a commandery chapter, may exist within or wholly or partly without the territory of a priory, known as Dependent or Independent Commanderies, respectively. Any country without a priory or commandery of its own is assumed into the "home priory" of England and The Islands, many of these being smaller Commonwealth of Nations states in which the order has only a minor presence. (Note: Those countries with Associations of the Order of St John are: Antigua and Barbuda, Barbados, Bermuda, Cyprus, Dominica, Fiji, Ghana, Gibraltar, Grenada, Guyana, India, Jamaica, Malawi, Malaysia, Malta, Mauritius, Montserrat, Namibia, Nigeria, Pakistan, Papua New Guinea, Saint Lucia, Solomon Islands, Sri Lanka, Swaziland, Tanzania, Trinidad and Tobago, Uganda, Zambia, and Zimbabwe.)

The Order of St John is said to have arrived in Canada in 1648, as the second Governor of New France, Charles de Montmagny, was a member of the original order, but it was not until 1883 that the first branch of the modern organisation was established in the Dominion, at Quebec City, growing to 12 branches by 1892. The Order of St John today constitutes part of the Canadian national honours system and the priory, established in 1946 out of the Commandery of Canada, is the largest outside of the United Kingdom, with some 6,000 members. The governor general, serves as the prior and chief officer in Canada, while lieutenant governors act as the vice-priors, overseeing the administration of the order in their respective province. These individuals thus automatically become Knights or Dames of Justice upon their assuming viceregal office.

An American Society of the Order of St John was established in 1957 as a foundation to assist the order with charitable work, after 1961 focusing its efforts specifically on the St John Ophthalmic Hospital in Jerusalem and some other organisations aiding the sick. This branch was successful enough that Queen Elizabeth II in 1996 officially created the Priory of the United States of America, the seventh priory at the time, with John R. Drexel as the first prior. By late 2000, the US Priory had approximately 1,100 members. As citizens of a country that did not have the sovereignty of the Order of St John vested in its head of state, American inductees who first joined the new priory were specifically asked to only "pay due obedience" to the governing authorities of the order "in all things consistent with your duty to your own country," thus eliminating any question of loyalty to a foreign head of state superseding American postulants' duties as US citizens.

=== Associations ===
- Americas: Antigua; Barbados; Bermuda; Dominica; Grenada; Guyana; Jamaica; Saint Lucia; Trinidad and Tobago
- Africas: Eswatini (formerly Swaziland); Ghana; Mauritius; Malawi; Nigeria; Tanzania; Uganda; Zambia; Zimbabwe
- Asia Pacific: Fiji; India; Papua New Guinea; Solomon Islands; Sri Lanka
- Europe and Middle East: Cyprus; Gibraltar; Malta

== Vestments and insignia ==
Upon admission into the Order of St John, confrères are presented with appropriate insignia, each level and office being depicted by different emblems and robes for wear at important occasions for the order. Common for all members of the Order is the badge, consisting of an eight-pointed Maltese Cross (embellished in the four principal angles alternately with two lions passant guardant and two unicorns passant). That for the Sovereign Head is gold with arms of white enamel and the embellishments rendered in gold, all surmounted by a jewelled St Edward's Crown, while those for the Officers of the order are the same save for the Grand Prior's having the crown made only of gold; the Lord Prior's having in place of the St Edward's Crown the coronet in gold of Albert, Prince of Wales (later Edward VII); and the Prelate's having instead a representation of a mitre in gold. Thereafter, the badges are prescribed as follows:

Insignia of the Order of St John
Grade	Bailiffs/Dames Grand Cross	Knights/Dames of Justice	Knights/Dames of Grace	Commanders	Officers	Members
Insignia						
Diameter	82.5 millimetres (3.25 in); 57.2 millimetres (2.25 in) suspended	57.2 millimetres (2.25 in)			44.4 millimetres (1.75 in)	
Material	Enamel					Silver
Backing and embellishments	Gold		Silver			Silver

All Bailiffs and Dames Grand Cross may wear their badges at the left hip on a 101.6 millimetres (4.00 in) (for men) or 82.5 millimetres (3.25 in) (for women) wide, black watered silk ribbon over the right shoulder and from a 16.5 millimetres (0.65 in) wide black band at the collar. Male Knights Justice or Grace and Commanders wear their badges on a 16.5mm wide ribbon at the neck, while Officers and Members have theirs on a 38 millimetres (1.5 in) straight ribbon suspended from a medal bar on the left breast. Females in all grades have the option of wearing their insignia on a ribbon bow pinned at the left shoulder. Bailiffs and Dames Grand Cross, Knights and Dames of Justice or Grace, and chaplains may all also wear a breast star, which appears the same as their badges, only at a diameter of 88.9 millimetres (3.50 in) and without embellishments for those in Grade I and 76 millimetres (3.0 in) for those in Grade II. Further, those in these groups are also given a button for wear on the lapel of non-formal civilian clothing, for events such as business meetings of the order. In general, the insignia of the Order of St John may be worn at all occasions where other decorations are worn, not only those connected with the ceremonies of the order.

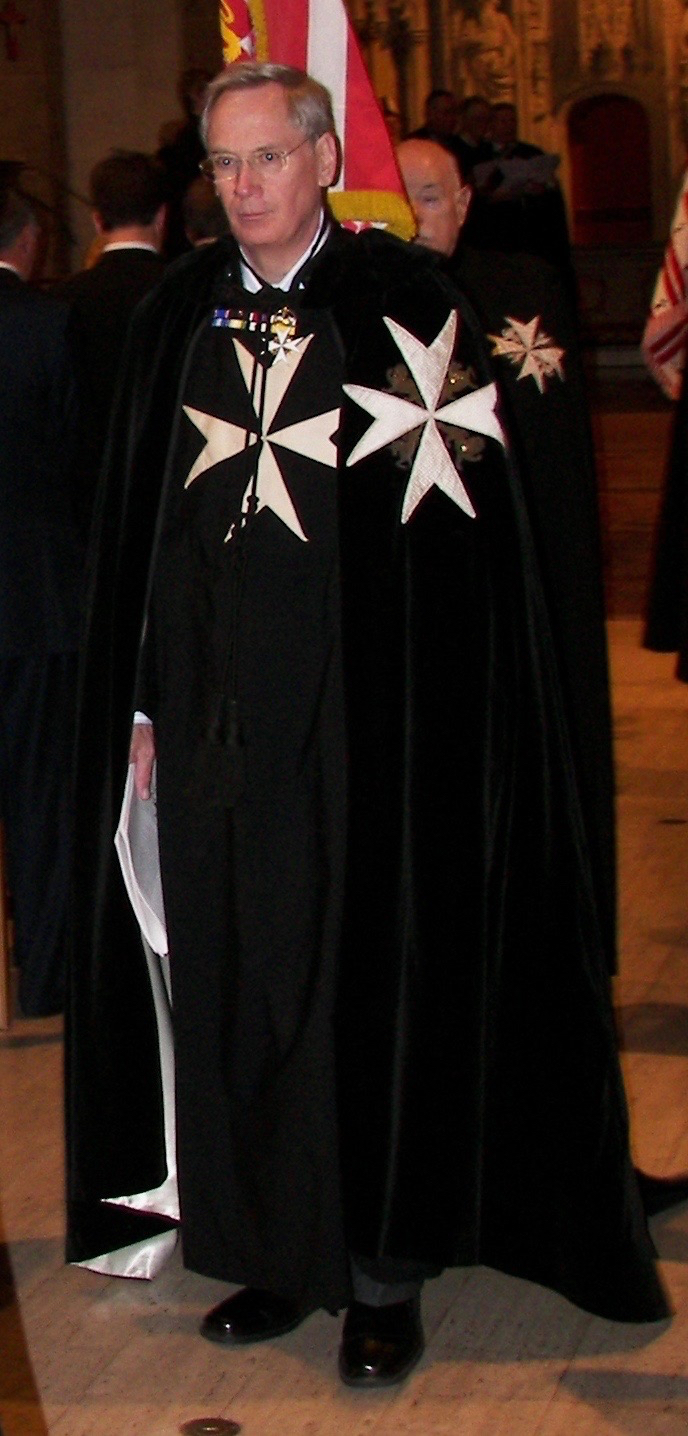
The Duke of Gloucester robed as Grand Prior of the Order of St John at an investiture in America, 2006

All members of the Order are also required to wear specific robes for formal occasions of the society, including a mantle, sopra vest, and hat. The mantles of the Sovereign Head and Grand Prior are all of black silk velvet and lined with white silk, the Sovereign Head's mantle is differentiated by an additional train. Bailiffs and Dames Grand Cross and, before 1926, Knights of Justice formerly wore black silk robes with a lining of the same material and colour; these members now wear the same mantle as Commanders and Officers, which are made of black merino wool faced with black silk. The only other unique mantles are those of the Medical Officer of the St John Ophthalmic Hospital, which bears a special pattern, and of chaplains, which is a black silk robe with full sleeves. Each cloak also bears on its left side a rendition of the order's star in white silk: the Sovereign Head, Grand Prior, and those in the first two grades of the order all have a 300 millimetres (12 in) diameter emblem; the Sovereign's and Grand Prior's are of white silk with gold adornments, the former's also surmounted by a St Edward's Crown, while those for Bailiffs and Dames Grand Cross, Knights and Dames of Justice, and Knights and Dames of Grace are rendered in white linen, the first two groups having embellishments in gold silk, the latter in white silk. Similarly, the star for Commanders and Officers is of white linen with white silk ornamentation, though they are only 228.6 millimetres (9.00 in) and 152.4 millimetres (6.00 in) in diameter, respectively. The secretaries of the order, the priors and the commanders also wear the badge superimposed upon two goose quill pens embroidered saltire-wise in white silk.

The sopra (or supra) vest is a long drape of thin, black cloth that buttons close down the neck and to one side, falling to the ankles and cut so as to entirely cover the body. It is similar to a cassock, though it is actually derived from the supra vesta—a black surcoat worn in the mid-13th century by the Knights of St John. Confrères in Grade I have a plain, white, 300mm diameter Maltese Cross on their sopra vests, while members of Grades II and III, plus chaplains, have a plain garment, though the wearer's Order of St John insignia is displayed outside the vest, 152mm below the collar. Clerical inductees of the order may, when officiating, wear over their cassock and surplice a mozzetta of black with red lining, edging, and buttons, a 76mm wide star worn on the left breast and the accordant badge suspended at the neck. When full mantles and sopra vests are worn a black velvet Tudor-style hat is included.

== Order of wear ==
Admission to or promotion within the Order of St John does "not confer any rank, style, title, dignity, appellation or social precedence whatsoever". Its place in the order of wear varies from country to country. Unlike those of other hierarchical orders, all grades of the Order of St John rank between the order's predecessor and successor. Some examples follow:

Country	Preceding	Following
Australia (Order of Wearing)	Medal of the Order of Australia (OAM)	Distinguished Conduct Medal (DCM) (if awarded prior to 6 October 1992) (Note: The "Australian Honours Order of Wearing" stipulates: "All Imperial British awards made to Australian citizens after 5 October 1992 are foreign awards and should be worn accordingly." Generally, foreign awards are worn after Australian awards and postnominals of foreign awards are not recognised.); Conspicuous Service Medal (CSM) (Note: The Most Venerable Order of Saint John is listed in the Australian Honours Order of Wearing to indicate where any awards within the Order of St John should be worn (including those awarded after 1992); however, the Service Medal of the Order of St John should be worn as a Long Service Medal after all other Imperial Long Service awards. Post-nominals within the Order of St John are not recognised as notified in the Governor-General's media release of 14 August 1982.)
Canada (Order of wear)	Member of the Royal Victorian Order (MVO)	Grand Officer of the National Order of Quebec (GOQ)
New Zealand (Order of wear)	Royal Red Cross (Class II) (ARRC)	Distinguished Conduct Medal (DCM)
United Kingdom	Royal Red Cross (Class II) (ARRC)	Distinguished Conduct Medal (DCM)

== Current Bailiffs and Dames Grand Cross ==
- Sovereign Head: King Charles III
- Grand Prior: Prince Richard, Duke of Gloucester KG GCVO GCStJ, appointed Grand Prior and Bailiff Grand Cross in 1975

Bailiffs and Dames Grand Cross

Name	Post-nominals	Year appointed
Queen Noor of Jordan	GCStJ	1989
Sir Norman Lloyd-Edwards	KCVO, GCStJ, RD, JP	1996
Professor Villis Marshall	AC, GCStJ	1999
Lady Elizabeth Godsal	MBE, GCStJ, DL	2000
Neville Byron Darrow	GCStJ	2005
Bishop Jack Nicholls	GCStJ	2007
Anthony Hugh Chignell	MBE, GCStJ, FRCS	2008
The Princess Royal	KG, KT, GCVO, GCStJ, QSO, CMM, ADC	2009
Brigadier John Hemsley	OBE, GCStJ	2009
Lieutenant-Colonel John Mah	GCStJ, CD, KC	2009
Major Ian Crowther	MBE, GCStJ	2010
John Rozet Drexel IV	GCStJ	2010
Richard Bruce	MOM, GCStJ	2011
The Hon. Dr Neil Conn	AO, GCStJ	2012
Stuart Shilson	CBE, LVO, GCStJ, DL	2013
Judith Ann Hoban	GCStJ	2013
Patrick Burgess	MBE, GCStJ, DL	2014
Major-General Professor John Pearn	AO, GCStJ, RFD	2014
Marshall Acuff Jr.	GCStJ, CFA	2014
Dr Low Bin Tick	OBE, GCStJ, JP	2014
Bishop Tim Stevens	CBE, GCStJ	2016
Fiona, the Hon. Lady Barttelot	MBE, GCStJ, DL	2017
Professor Mark Compton	AM, GCStJ	2017
Major Marsden Madoka	OBE, GCStJ	2020
Dr Gillian Boughton-Willmore	GCStJ, FRSA	2020
Dr Steven Evans	GCStJ, FRCP	2021
Robert Hector White	GCStJ	2022
The Duchess of Edinburgh	GCVO, GCStJ, CD	2022
Ann Elizabeth Cable	MBE, GCStJ, DL	2023
Thomas Matthew Budd	GCStJ	2023
Cameron Oxley	GCStJ	2024
Sir David Hempleman-Adams	KCVO, OBE, GCStJ, DL	2025
Stuart Waetzel	GCStJ	2025
Archbishop Sir David Moxon	KNZM, GCStJ	2025
Dr Michel C Doré	GCStJ	2025
Sir Andrew John Cash	OBE, GCStJ	2026
John Whitehead	CNZM, GCStJ	2026

== See also ==
- Service Medal of the Order of St John
- Donat of the Order of Saint John
- Sovereign Military Order of Malta
- List of the priors of Saint John of Jerusalem in England
- List of bailiffs and dames grand cross of the Order of St John
- Order of Saint John (Bailiwick of Brandenburg)
- Museum of the Order of St John

== Bibliography ==
- Elizabeth II (2004), "Supplemental Royal Charter, 1974", in Elizabeth II (ed.), Royal Charters and Statutes of the Most Venerable Order of the Hospital of St. John of Jerusalem, 5, Westminster: Queen's Printer, p. 6, archived from the original on 5 March 2017
- Hoegen Dijkhof, Hans J. (2006). The Legitimacy of Orders of St. John: A Historical and Legal Analysis and Case Study of a Para-Religious Phenomenon. Leiden: University of Leiden. ISBN 90-6550-954-2.
- King, E. J. (Earl of Scarbrough) (1924). The Grand Priory of the Order of the Hospital of St. John of Jerusalem in England. Literary Licensing, LLC. ISBN 978-1-4940-5105-1.
- McCreery, Christopher (2008). The Maple Leaf and the White Cross: A History of St. John Ambulance and the Most Venerable Order of the Hospital of St. John of Jerusalem in Canada. Toronto: Dundurn Press. ISBN 978-1-55002-740-2.
- Temple, Philip, ed. (2008). "St John's Gate and St John's Lane". South and East Clerkenwell. Survey of London. Vol. 46. New Haven, London: English Heritage. pp. 142–63. ISBN 978-0-300-13727-9.
- Riley-Smith, Jonathan (1994). "The Order of St John in England, 1827–1858". In Barber, Malcolm (ed.). The Military Orders: Fighting for the Faith and Caring for the Sick. Aldershot: Variorum. pp. 121–38. ISBN 0-86078-438-X.
- Riley-Smith, Jonathan (2013). The Crusades, Christianity, and Islam. Columbia University Press. ISBN 978-0-231-51794-2.
- Sire, H. J. A. (1996). The Knights of Malta. Yale University Press. ISBN 978-0-300-06885-6.
- Stephens, Edward Bell (1837). The Basque Provinces: Their Political State, Scenery, and Inhabitants; With Adventures Among the Carlists and Christinos. Whittaker & Co.
