= Anthony Mellows =

English solicitor & British Army officer (1936-2016)

Professor Anthony Mellows OBE, TD
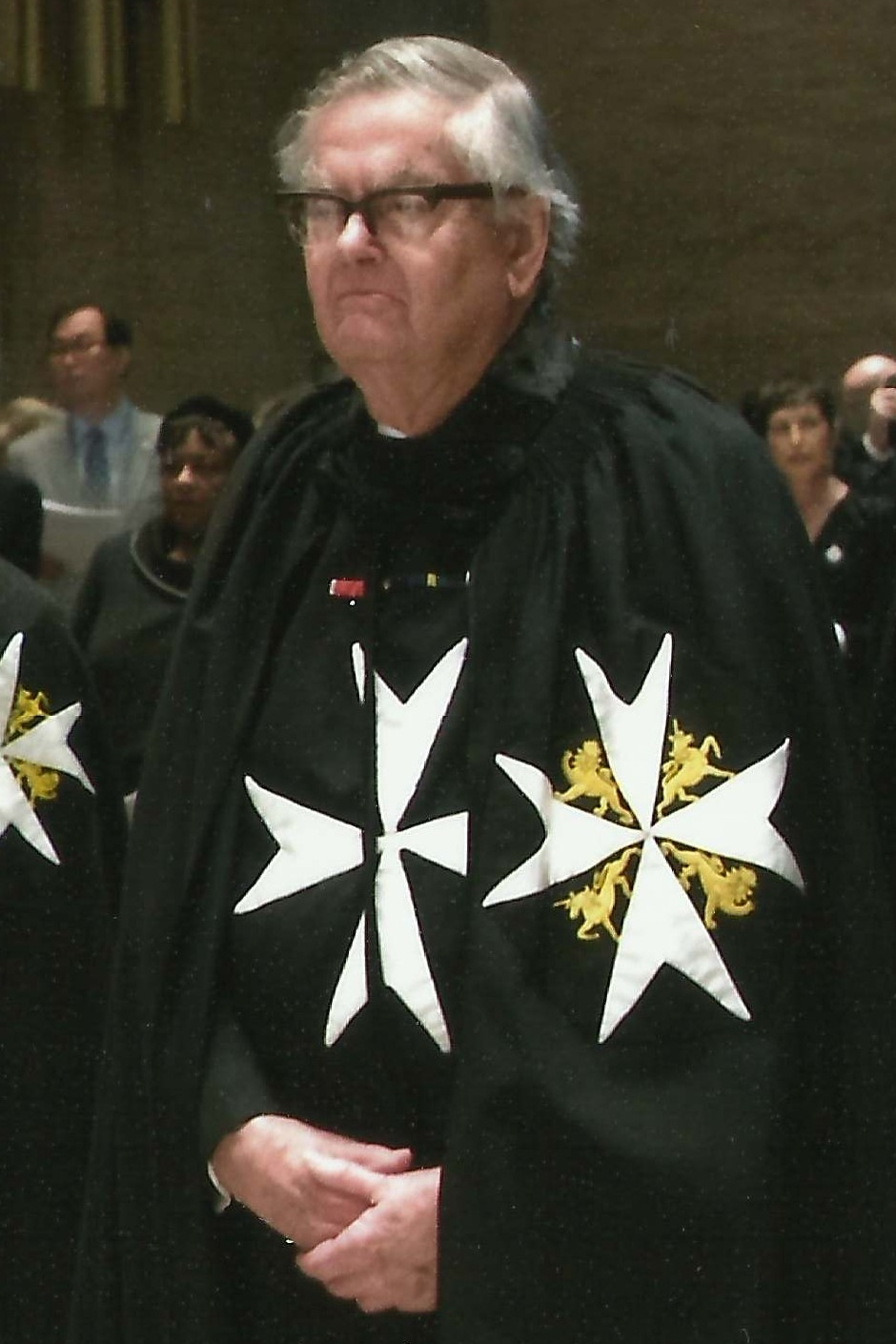

Lord Prior of Order of St John
- In office 24 June 2008 – 24 June 2014
- Monarch: Elizabeth II
- Preceded by: Colonel Eric Barry
- Succeeded by: Neil Conn

Personal details
- Born: Anthony Roger Mellows; 29 July 1936
- Died: 10 January 2016 (aged 79)
- Profession: Solicitor, academic

Anthony Roger Mellows, OBE, TD (29 July 1936 – 10 January 2016) was an English solicitor, academic and part-time British Army officer. Until June 2014 (having succeeded Lieutenant-Colonel Eric Barry, in 2008), he served as Lord Prior of the Order of Saint John, the order's most senior non-royal office.

== Career ==
=== Military career ===
Mellows began his military career in the British Army by joining the other ranks, rising to the rank of sergeant. On 27 January 1959, he was commissioned in the TA Intelligence Corps, as a second lieutenant (probationary). On 1 January 1964, he was promoted captain and seconded to the staff. On 1 April 1967, he transferred to the newly created Territorial and Army Volunteer Reserve as a captain in the Intelligence Corps. On 18 November 1970, he was placed on the Regular Army Reserve of Officers list.

=== Academic career ===
Mellows was Professor of Law in the University of London and served as Head of the Department of Law at King's College London and Dean of the Faculty of Laws of the University of London.

== Order of St John ==
In May 1981, Mellows was appointed an Officer of the Most Venerable Order of Saint John. In April 1985, he was promoted to the grade of Commander, and in 1988 he was raised to Knight of Justice.

In July 1991, he was advanced as Bailiff Grand Cross of the Order of Saint John, its highest grade. He also was decorated with the St John Service Medal.

=== Other honours ===
In 1969, he received the Territorial Decoration (TD) awarded for long service as a Territorial Army officer.

In the 2003 New Year Honours, he was appointed Officer of the Order of the British Empire (OBE) "for services to the Church of England".

Honour ribbons

- : Order of the British Empire (OBE)
- : Bailiff Grand Cross of the Order of St John
- : Territorial Decoration (TD)
- : Service Medal of the Order of St John

Preceded by Colonel Eric Barry	Lord Prior of the Order of Saint John; 2008 to 2014	Succeeded by Neil Conn
