= Eric Barry =

Canadian army militia officer (1927–2015)

Lieutenant Colonel Eric Barry CD

Lord Prior of the Order of St John
- In office 24 June 2002 – 24 June 2008
- Monarch: Elizabeth II
- Preceded by: The Lord Vestey
- Succeeded by: Professor Anthony Mellows

Personal details
- Born: Eric Lawrence Barrow; 1927 Ontario, Canada
- Died: 24 August 2015 (aged 87–88) Ontario, Canada
- Spouse: Christine née Michaud
- Profession: Canadian Armed Forces

Military service
- Branch/service: Canadian Army
- Rank: Lieutenant Colonel
- Commands: The Royal Canadian Hussars (Montreal)

Lieutenant Colonel Eric Lawrence Barry CD (1927–2015) was a Canadian Army militia officer, who served as Lord Prior of the Venerable Order of St John from 2002 until 2008.

Honour Ribbon of the Order of St John:

- : Venerable Order of St John Order of Saint John (chartered 1888)
- : Canadian Forces' Decoration (CD)

== See also ==
- The Royal Canadian Hussars (Montreal)
- Order of Saint John

Preceded by The Lord Vestey	Lord Prior of St John; 2002 to 2008	Succeeded by Professor Anthony Mellows
