= List of British generals and brigadiers =

This is a list of people who have held general officer rank or the rank of brigadier (together now recognized as starred officers) in the British Army, Royal Marines, British Indian Army or other British military force since the Acts of Union 1707.

From the 1740s, brigadier-general was not a rank but a temporary appointment given to colonels or lieutenant-colonels. From 1921 to 1928 there was no brigadier appointment, the appointment replaced with the title colonel-commandant. This was replaced with the appointment of "brigadier". From 1 November 1947 brigadier became a substantive rank in the British Army. It remainded an appointment in the Royal Marines until 1997.

A "Brigadier" is not classed as a "general" in the British Army, despite being a NATO OF-6 equivalent rank. Prior to the mid to late-1990s, British ranks used a hyphen.

Hence, in the lists below:

- 1* = Brigadier-general/Brigadier
- 2* = Major-general (prior to 1990s)/Major general (mid-1990s onwards)
- 3* = Lieutenant-general (prior to 1990s)/Lieutenant general (mid-1990s onwards)
- 4* = General
- 5* = Field marshal

(dates after the name are birth and death)

== A ==
- Major-General Henry Richard Abadie (1841–1915), General Officer Commanding (GOC).
- Major-General Herbert Edward Stacy Abbott (1814–1915), Indian Army
- General Sir James Abbott (1807–1896), Indian Army
- Brigadier Burton Edward Abbott (1906–1968), Local brigadier March-August 1943, acting brigadier 1 April- 21 May 1944 13th Frontier Force, Indian Army
- Brigadier Leonard Henry Abbott (1875–1949), Deputy Assistant (DA) & Quartermaster General (QMG)
- Brigadier-General (Note: honorary rank) Anthony Abdy (1856–1924), DA & QMG
- Brigadier Sir Alexander Abel Smith (1904–1980)
- General James Abercrombie (1706–1781), Commander-in-Chief, North America
- Lieutenant-General Sir John Abercromby (1772–1817), Commander-in Chief, Bombay Army and Madras Army
- Lieutenant-General Sir Ralph Abercromby (1734–1801), Commander-in-Chief, Ireland
- General Sir Robert Abercromby (1740–1827), Commander-in-Chief, India
- Lieutenant-General William Scarlett, 3rd Baron Abinger (1826–1892)
- Major-General Kevin David Abraham (1960— ), Director General of Army Reform, late Royal Regiment of Artillery
- Major-General Matt Abraham (1919–2001), Director of Combat Development
- Major-General Sir William Abraham (1897–1980), Controller General of Military Economy, India
- Major-General Sir John Acland (1928–2006), GOC South West District
- Brigadier Peter Acland (1902–1993)
- Lieutenant-General Sir Wroth Palmer Acland (1770–1816)
- Major-General Sir Allan Adair (1897–1988), GOC Guards Armoured Division and Guards Division
- General Sir Charles Adair (1822–1897), Deputy Adjutant-General Royal Marines
- General Sir William Adair (1850–1931), Deputy Adjutant General Royal Marines
- General Sir Frederick Adam (1781–1853)
- Brigadier-General Frederick John Stuart Adam (1837–1920), Indian Staff Corps
- Lieutenant-General Alexander Adams (c. 1772–1834)
- Lieutenant-General Cadwallader Adams CB (1826–1893)
- Major-General Henry William Adams CB (1805–1854) 18th (Royal Irish) & 49th Infantry
- Major-General Sir John Worthington Adams (1764–1837), Indian Army
- Major-General Sir Robert Adams CB VC (1856–1928), Indian Army
- Brigadier-General Thomas Adams (c. 1730–1764), Commander-in-Chief, India, posthumously promoted
- Major-General George Henry Addison (1876–1964), Colonel Commandant, Corps of Royal Engineers
- Brigadier Leonard Addison (1902–1975), Indian Army
- Brigadier William Michael Rutherford Addison (1935–2000)
- Brigadier Alleyne John Addy (1917–1994), Royal Pioneer Corps
- General James Whorwood Adeane (1740–1802)
- Brigadier-General Rodolph Adlercron (1873–1966), GOC Infantry Brigade and Calais Base
- Major-General Sir John Adye (1857–1930)
- Brigadier John Frederick Adye (Note: Acting brigadier 6 February 1944 to 9 March 1944) (1900–1977), Royal Artillery, 4th Indian Infantry Division
- General Sir John Miller Adye (1819–1900), Surveyor-General of the Ordnance
- General Sir James Affleck, 3rd Baronet (1759–1833), GOC Irish Western Military District
- Local Brigadier Monowar Khan Afridi (1900–1968), Director of Malariology Indian Medical Service
- Lieutenant-General Sir Andrew Agnew, 5th Baronet (1689–1771)
- Brigadier-General James Agnew (1719–1777)
- Major-General Donal Maurice Ahern (1911–1966), deputy director of Medical Services, Eastern Command
- Brigadier David Francis Aikenhead (1895–1955), Royal Artillery
- Brigadier-General Henry Sandys Ainsley (1869–1948), GOC 18th Brigade, 6th Division
- General George Ainslie (died 1804), Colonel of the 13th (1st Somersetshire) Regiment of Foot
- Major-General Sir Ralph Ainsworth (1875–1952), Director of Medical Services, Joint War Organization
- Brigadier William Aird-Smith (1893–1942), Indian Army
- General Richard Airey, 1st Baron Airey (1803–1881), Adjutant-General to the Forces
- Brigadier Rowland Montagu Airey (1884— ), Army Service Corps
- Lieutenant-General Sir Terence Airey (1900–1983), Commander British Forces in Hong Kong
- Major-General Sir Christopher Airy (1934–2005), GOC London District
- General Sir John Aitchison (1779–1875), Colonel of the Scots Fusilier Guards
- Brigadier Alastair Aitken, CO 77th Brigade
- Brigadier-General Arthur Aitken (1861–1924), Temporary Major-General
- Brigadier Robert Aitken (1955—)
- Brigadier William Henry Hutton Aitken (1898–1978), Royal Engineers
- Major-General John Aldam Aizlewood (1895–1990), GOC 42nd Armoured Division
- General Sir John Akehurst (1930–2007), Deputy Supreme Allied Commander Europe
- Major-General William Philip Jopp Akerman (1888–1972), Director of Staff Duties (Artillery), Army Headquarters India
- Field Marshal Alan Brooke, 1st Viscount Alanbrooke (1883–1963), Chief of the Imperial General Staff (1941–1946)
- Major-General Clifton Edward Rawdon Grant Alban (1889–1964), Aide-de-camp (ADC) to the King
- General George Keppel, 3rd Earl of Albemarle (1724–1772), Colonel of the 3rd (The King's Own) Regiment of Dragoons
- General George Keppel, 6th Earl of Albemarle (1799–1891)
- Lieutenant-General Willem van Keppel, 2nd Earl of Albemarle (1702–1754)
- Lieutenant-General Sir Edwin Alderson (1859–1927), GOC Canadian Corps
- Brigadier Toby Low, 1st Baron Aldington (1914–2000), King's Royal Rifle Corps
- Brigadier James Robert Travers Aldous (1898–1985), Royal Engineers
- Brigadier-General Charles Henry Alexander (1856–1946), Commander, Royal Artillery
- Major-General David Alexander (1926–2017), Royal Marines
- Major-General Ernest Alexander VC (1870–1934), General Office Commanding, Royal Artillery
- Field Marshal Harold Alexander, 1st Earl Alexander of Tunis (1891–1969), Supreme Allied Commander Allied Force Headquarters
- Major-General Henry Lethbridge Alexander CB CMG DSO (1878–1944), DA & QMG
- Major-General Henry Templer Alexander (1927–2014), Chief of the Defence Staff (Ghana)
- General Sir James Edward Alexander (1803–1885)
- Major-General John Oswald Claud Alexander (1936— ), Commander, Communications, British Army of the Rhine
- Major-General Paul Donald Alexander (1934–2018), Colonel Commandant Royal Corps of Signals
- Major-General David Alexander-Sinclair (1927–2014), GOC 1st Division
- Major-General Frederick John Alfieri (1826–1907), Director of Supplies & Transport, Army Headquarters India
- General Sir Archibald Alison, 2nd Baronet (1826–1907), GOC Aldershot Command
- Brigadier-General Percy Stuart Allan (1875— ), GOC 155th Brigade, 52nd (Lowland) Division, TF
- Brigadier-General Walter Allason (1875–1960), GOC 52nd Infantry Brigade, 17th (Northern) Division
- Brigadier-General Alfred James Whitacre Allen (1857–1939), GOC 74th Brigade, 25th Division
- Brigadier Algernon Anderson Johnston Allen (1893–1970), Sherwood Foresters
- Brigadier Basil George Allen (1893–1970)
- Brigadier Frederick Joshua Allen (1897–1954), Royal Corps of Signals
- Brigadier Douglas Kenneth Allen BEM (1921–2007), Director, Ordnance Services, I Corps (United Kingdom)
- Brigadier John Frederick Whitacre Allen MC (1890–1976), The Buffs
- Major-General John Geoffrey Robyn Allen (1923–2010), Royal Armoured Corps
- Brigadier John Robert Allen (1893–1971), Royal Army Service Corps
- Brigadier Norman Charles Allen, Corps of Military Police
- Major-General Robert Hall Allen (1886–1981), GOC 5th, 8th Anti-Aircraft Division
- Brigadier Ronald Lewis Allen (1916–1986), Royal Army Ordnance Corps
- Major-General William Maurice Allen, Director of Transport and Movements
- Field Marshal Edmund Allenby, 1st Viscount Allenby (1861–1936), GOC Egyptian Expeditionary Force
- Brigadier-General Sir Arthur John Allen-Williams (1869–1949), Royal Engineers
- Lieutenant-General Sir Charles Allfrey (1895–1964), GOC V Corps during the Italian campaign
- Brigadier-General William Henry Loraine Allgood (1868–1957), GOC 45th Brigade, 15th (Scottish) Division
- Brigadier George Frederick Allison KBE MC (1888–1946), Royal Army Medical Corps
- Brigadier William Wigram Allison (1895–1984), CO 307th Infantry Brigade (NW Europe)
- Brigadier Edward Allman-Smith (1886–1969), deputy director of Medical Services in British Palestine and Trans-Jordan
- Brigadier George Frederick Hill Alms (1895–1973), Royal Engineers
- Brigadier Francis Allan Littlejohns Alstead (1935–2024), CO, 51st (Scottish) Brigade
- Llewellyn Alston CBE DSO MC (1890–1968), Royal Welch Fusiliers
- Major-General Sir Charles Alten GCB (1764–1840), Led Wellington's 3rd Division during the Hundred Days
- Major-General Robert Guy Eardley Yerburgh, 2nd Baron Alvingham (1926–2020), Director of Army Quartering
- Brigadier Robert Denis Ambrose OBE MC (1896–1974), Inspector-General of Frontier Corps
- Field Marshal Jeffrey Amherst, 1st Baron Amherst (1717–1797), Commander-in-Chief of the Forces
- Lieutenant-General William Amherst (1732–1781), Adjutant-General to the Forces
- Major General Darrell Amison (1968— ), Director, Development, Concepts and Doctrine Centre
- Major-General Leon Williamson Amps (1892–1989), Director of Works, War Office
- Brigadier Serena Anand (1975– )
- Major-General Sir Thomas Anburey (1759–1849), Bengal Engineers
- General Peregrine Bertie, 3rd Duke of Ancaster and Kesteven (1714–1778)
- General Alexander Anderson (1807–1877), Royal Marine Light Infantry
- Major-General Alexander Vass Anderson (1895–1963), Director of Civil Affairs at the War Office
- Major-General Alistair Andrew Gibson Anderson, Signal Officer-in-Chief
- Brigadier Andrew Anderson (1890–1999), CO 11th Indian Infantry Brigade (North African campaign); POW in Colditz
- Brigadier Austin Thomas Anderson (1868–1949), CRA; commanded the 48th (South Midland) Division's artillery in 1920–24
- Lieutenant General Sir Charles Alexander Anderson (1857–1940), GOC Corps
- General David Anderson (1821–1909), governor of the Royal Military College, Sandhurst
- Lieutenant-General Sir Desmond Anderson (1885–1967), Commanded III and then II Corps
- Brigadier Sir Duncan Anderson KBE TD* CEng FICE MIStructE (1901–1980), chairman of the materials committee of the Allied economics board
- Brigadier Sir Gilmour Anderson (1914–1977), CO of the 16th Infantry Brigade
- Lieutenant-General Sir Hastings Anderson (1872–1930), Quartermaster-General to the Forces
- General Sir John Anderson (1908–1988), Deputy Chief of Imperial General Staff and Military Secretary
- Major-General Sir John Evelyn Anderson (1916–2007), Royal Corps of Signals Officer-in-Chief
- General Sir Kenneth Anderson (1891–1959), Commander of the British First Army
- Brigadier Dame Mary Anderson (1916–2006), Director of the Women's Royal Army Corps
- Major-General Nelson Graham Anderson (1875–1945), DA & QMG
- Lieutenant-General Sir Richard Anderson (1907–1979), General Officer Commanding-in-Chief Northern Ireland Command
- Brigadier Robert Charles Beckett Anderson DSO (1895–1982), Argyll and Sutherland Highlanders
- Brigadier-General Stuart Milligan Anderson DSO (1879–1954), CRA
- Brigadier William Anderson (1886–1949), Royal Army Medical Corps
- Brigadier Reginald Wood Andrews MC (1897–1978), Royal Regiment of Artillery
- Field Marshal Henry Paget, 1st Marquess of Anglesey (1768–1854), Master-General of the Ordnance
- Brigadier Tom Hardy Angus (1889–1984), Director of Air, Army Headquarters India
- Brigadier Seymour Willoughby Anketell-Jones OBE MC (1898–1972), deputy director of Ordnance Services India
- Brigadier-General Barnett Dyer Lempriere Gray Anley CMG DSO (1873–1954), GOC 125th (Lancashire Fusiliers) Brigade, TA
- Brigadier-General Frederick Gore Anley CB CMG (1864–1936), GOC No 8 Demobilisation Area
- Brigadier-General William Bower Anley DSO (1871–1928), Commander, Heavy Artillery (CHA) commanding the heavy artillery of VII Corps, three days before the Armistice
- Brigadier Francis Dighton Annesley (1888–1983), Royal Army Medical Corps
- Major-General Nicholas George Picton Ansell (1937–2024), Director, Royal Armoured Corps
- Major-General Sir Edward Anson (1826–1925), Lieutenant Governor of Penang
- Major-General Hon. George Anson (1797–1857), Commander-in-Chief, India
- General Sir George Anson GCB (1769–1849)
- General Sir William Anson, 1st Baronet (1772–1847)
- Brigadier Sir John Anstey (1907–2000), Deputy head of SOE's India Mission
- Brigadier John Henry Anstice (1897–1970)
- Lieutenant-General Philip Anstruther (c. 1680–1760), Colonel of the 26th (Cameronian) Regiment of Foot
- Brigadier Sir Richard Anstruther-Gough-Calthorpe, 2nd Baronet (1908–1985), deputy director of Military Operations (A), War Office
- Brigadier-General Edward Benjamin Appelbe (1855–1935), Royal Army Ordnance Corps
- Major-General David Stanley Appleby (1918–1989), Director General Army Legal Corps
- Lieutenant-General Dick Applegate (1955— ), Quartermaster-General to the Forces
- Brigadier Gilbert Leonard Appleton (1894–1970), Director of Technical Training, War Office
- Major-General Frederick Ernest Appleyard (1829–1911)
- Major-General Kenelm Charles Appleyard (1894–1967), Royal Engineers
- Brigadier-General Alexander George Arbuthnot DSO (1873–1961)
- Lieutenant-General Sir Charles Arbuthnot GCB (1824–1899), Commander-in-Charge, Madras Army
- General Charles George James Arbuthnot (1801–1870), Colonel of the 72nd Regiment, Duke of Albany's Own Highlanders
- Brigadier-General Sir Dalrymple Arbuthnot (1867–1941), CRA
- Major-General George Alexander Arbuthnot (1830–1899), Madras Cavalry
- Major-General George Bingham Arbuthnot (1803–1867), Madras Light Cavalry
- Major-General Henry Thomas Arbuthnot (1834–1919), Royal Artillery
- General Sir Hugh Arbuthnot (1780–1868), Colonel of the 79th Regiment of Foot (Cameron Highlanders)
- Lieutenant-General Sir Robert Arbuthnot (1773–1853), General Officer Commanding, Ceylon
- Lieutenant-General Sir Thomas Arbuthnot KCB (1776–1849), GOC Northern District
- General William Arbuthnot, ( —1876), Royal Artillery
- Major-General William Arbuthnot (1838–1893), 14th King's Hussars
- Major-General Keith Arbuthnott, 15th Viscount of Arbuthnott (1900–1980), GOC, 51st (Highland) Division
- Major-General St. John Desmond Arcedeckne-Butler (1896–1959), Royal Corps of Signals
- Brigadier Arthur Somerville Archdale (1882–1948), Royal Artillery
- Brigadier-General Hugh Archdale (1854–1921), GOC 46th (North Midland) Division
- General Mervyn Archdall (1763–1839), Lieutenant-governor of the Isle of Wight
- General Sir John Archer (1924–1999), Commander-in-Chief, British Armed Forces
- Brigadier Henry Archer (1883–1970), CRA, 53rd Infantry Division
- Brigadier Brian Mortimer Archibald (1906–1993), Royal Engineers
- Brigadier Gordon King Archibald (1885–1942)
- Major-General Sidney Charles Manley Archibald (1890–1973)
- Major-General Sir John Charles Ardagh (1840–1907), Director of Military Intelligence
- Philip Alexander Arden (1892–1966) Royal Army Service Corps
- Brigadier Eustace Alford Arderne (1899–1994), Commanding Officer 25th Indian Infantry Brigade
- Brigadier Anthony James Arengo Arengo-Jones
- Field Marshal John Campbell, 2nd Duke of Argyll (1680–1743), Master-General of the Ordnance
- General John Campbell, 4th Duke of Argyll (c.1693—1770), Colonel of the 2nd (Royal North British) Regiment of Dragoons
- Field Marshal John Campbell, 5th Duke of Argyll (1723–1806), Commander-in-Chief, Scotland
- Brigadier Jane Mary Arigho, Director of Army Nursing Services
- Brigadier Michael Anthony Aris, Director of Army Reserves and Cadets
- Major-General Robert Arkwright (1903–1971), GOC 7th Armoured Division
- General Sir Clement Armitage, GOC 1st Infantry Division (1881–1973)
- Brigadier-General Edward Hume Armitage (1859–1949), CRA
- Brigadier Edward Leathley Armitage (1891–1957), CRA, 38th Infantry Division
- Major-General Geoffrey Armitage (1917–1996), GOC North East District
- Brigadier-General Charles Johnstone Armstrong (1872–1933), Chief Engineer, VII Corps
- Brigadier Charles Armstrong (1897–1985), East Surrey Regiment
- Brigadier Edward Francis Egerton Armstrong (1890–1995), Deputy Military Secretary
- Brigadier John Cardew Armstrong (1887–1953), Royal Army Service Corps
- Major-General John Armstrong (1674–1742), Surveyor-General of the Ordnance
- Lieutenant-General Sir Richard Armstrong (c.1782—1854), Commander-in-Chief, Madras Army
- Brigadier Robin Armstrong (died 2021), Royal Highland Fusiliers
- Brigadier Sereld John Cardew Armstrong (1894–1959), Royal Engineers
- Brigadier Walter Johnston Armstrong (1907–1982), Indian Army
- Brigadier Sir George Ayscough Armytage, 7th Baronet., GOC 117th Infantry Brigade
- Brigadier Harry William Hugh Armytage (1890–1967), CRA, 9th Infantry Division
- Major-General Allan Cholmondeley Arnold (1893–1962), Military Attaché to Turkey
- Brigadier-General Benedict Arnold (1741–1801), Continental Army
- Brigadier Giles Geoffrey Arnold, Deputy Commander, British Land Forces, Hong Kong
- Major-General Stanley Arnott (1888–1972), Royal Army Medical Corps
- Lieutenant-General Charles Butler, 1st Earl of Arran (1671–1758), Master-General of the Ordnance in Ireland
- Lieutenant General Sir George Arthur, 1st Baronet (1784–1854), Governor of Bombay
- Lieutenant General Sir Norman Arthur (1931–2023), GOC Scottish Command
- Brigadier Sir Robert Duncan Harris Arundell (1904–1989)
- General Sir Charles Asgill, 2nd Baronet (1762–1823), Colonel of the 11th (the North Devonshire) Regiment of Foot
- Brigadier Edward Raymond Ash (1897–1957), ADC to the Queen
- Brigadier-General Lionel Forbes Ashburner (1874–1923), GOC 142nd Brigade
- Major-General Sir Cromer Ashburnham (1831–1917), Governor of Suakin
- General Charles Ashe à Court-Repington (1785–1861), Colonel of the 41st (Welch) Regiment of Foot
- General William Ashe-à Court (c. 1708–1781), Colonel of the 11th Regiment of Foot
- Brigadier Brenton Haliburton Ashmore (1900–1987), The Royal Scots
- Major-General Edward Ashmore (1872–1953), GOC RFC Brigade and CRA
- Major General Nicholas Ashmore (1961—), GOC Scotland
- Major-General Sir Charles Ashworth (c. 1784–1832), Peninsular War
- Brigadier Harold Kenneth Ashworth (1903–1978), Royal Army Medical Corps
- Brigadier-General Henry Francis Askwith (1866–1938), Royal Artillery
- Major-General Alfred Rimbault Aslett (1901–1980), Acting GOC 36th Infantry Division (Burma)
- Brigadier Cecil Faber Aspinall-Oglander (1878–1959), Brigadier-General, General Staff of VIII Corps
- Brigadier-General The Honourable Arthur Melland Asquith (1883–1939), GOC 189th Brigade
- General Sir John Asser (1867–1949), Governor of Bermuda
- Brigadier-General Verney Asser (1873–1944), Royal Artillery
- Major-General Sir George Aston (1861–1938), GOC Natal
- Major-General Sir Llewellyn William Atcherley (1871–1954), DA & QMG
- Brigadier Maurice Alan Atherton CBE, JP, DL, DCL (1926–2019), Commander of Shorncliffe Garrison
- Major-General Alexander Cambridge, 1st Earl of Athlone (1874–1957), Head of British Mission Belgian, Grand Quartier Général
- Brigadier-General John Stewart-Murray, 8th Duke of Atholl (1871–1942), Scottish Horse Mounted Brigade
- Brigadier Robert Ringrose Gelston Atkins (1891–1969), Royal Army Medical Corps
- Brigadier Anthony Barrie Atkinson (1940— ), Army Catering Corps
- Brigadier-General Ben Atkinson, DA & QMG
- Brigadier David John Atkinson, Royal Artillery
- Lieutenant-General Sir Edwin Henry De Vere Atkinson (1867–1947), Chief Engineer
- Brigadier-General Francis Garnett Atkinson (1857–1941), CO, Bangalore Cavalry
- Major-General Sir Leonard Atkinson (1910–1990), Director of Electrical and Mechanical Engineering
- Brigadier Charles John Attfield (1898–1981), Commanding Officer 27th Indian Infantry Brigade
- Brigadier Herbert Arthur Reginald Aubrey (1883–1954), Commanding Officer 212th Independent Brigade
- Field Marshal Sir Claude Auchinleck (1884–1981), Commander-in-Chief, India
- Lieutenant-General Sir Samuel Auchmuty (1758–1822), Commander-in-Chief, Ireland
- James Touchet, 5th Baron Audley (c.1398–1459)
- Brigadier Edward Gordon Audland (1896–1976), Royal Artillery
- Major-General Arthur Bramston Austin (1893–1967), Colonel Commandant, Royal Army Dental Corps
- Brigadier Richard Andrew Austin (1892–1968), Royal Army Medical Corps
- Brigadier Ronald Douglas Austin, Royal Pioneer Corps
- Brigadier Geoffrey William Auten (1896–1978), Welch Regiment
- Brigadier Alec Pendock Aveline (1897–1982), The Royal Berkshire Regiment
- Lieutenant-General Sir Fenton Aylmer, 13th Baronet (1862–1935), Adjutant-General (India)
- Major-General Harry Aylmer (1813–1904), Royal Artillery
- Matthew Whitworth-Aylmer, 5th Baron Aylmer (1775–1850), Governor General of British North America

== B ==
- Lieutenant-General Sir William Babtie (1859–1920), Royal Army Medical Corps
- Major-General Anthony Bacon (1796–1864)
- General Sir Alexander Robert Badcock (1844–1907), quartermaster-general, Indian Army
- Major-General John Michael Watson Badcock (1922–2020), Royal Corps of Signals
- Brigadier Robert Baddeley (born 1934), Director of Army Training and Inspector of Physical & Adventurous Training.
- Lieutenant-General Robert Baden-Powell, 1st Baron Baden-Powell (1857–1941), GOC 50th (Northumbrian) Division
- Brigadier John Stanhope Badley (1923–2007), Aide-de-Camp to Queen Elizabeth II, Royal Artillery
- Field Marshal Sir Nigel Bagnall (1927–2002), Chief of the General Staff
- Brigadier Ralph Bagnold (1896–1990), Deputy Signal Officer-in-Chief Middle East
- Major-General Jonathan Bernard Appleton Bailey (1951– ), Director General Development and Doctrine
- Lieutenant-General Duncan Baillie (1826–1890),
- Major-General Sir Guy Bainbridge (1867–1943), GOC 1st Division
- Lieutenant-General Sir Philip Bainbrigge (1786–1862), Colonel of the 26th (Cameronian) Regiment of Foot
- General Sir David Baird, 1st Baronet (1757–1829), Commander-in-Chief, Ireland
- General Sir Douglas Baird (1877–1963), GOC Eastern Command (India)
- Brigadier-General Ned Baird (1864–1956), Commanding Officer, 179th (2/4th London) Brigade
- Lieutenant-General Sir James Baird (1915–2007), Director General Army Medical Services
- Brigadier John Edmund Alexander Baird CMG CBE (1900–1958), Commander, Local Land Forces Middle East
- Brigadier-General Arthur Slade Baker (1863–1943), Royal Artillery
- Field Marshal Sir Geoffrey Baker (1912–1980), Chief of the General Staff
- Major-General Ian Baker (1927–2005), GOC North East District
- Major-General Jasper Baker (1877–1964), Director-General of Army Ordnance Services
- Lieutenant-General Sir Thomas Durand Baker (1837–1893), Quartermaster-General to the Forces
- Lieutenant-General Sir William Henry Goldney Baker (1888–1964), Adjutant-General (India)
- Brigadier-General Christopher D'Arcy Bloomfield Saltern Baker-Carr (1878–1949), 1st Brigade, Tank Corps
- Alexander Lindsay, 6th Earl of Balcarres (1752–1825), Governor of Jamaica
- Brigadier Stanley Thomas Baldry (1925–2021), Commanding Officer, 29th Engineer Brigade
- Brigadier-General Anthony Hugh Baldwin (1863–1915), Manchester Regiment
- Brigadier Alick Buchanan-Smith, Baron Balerno (1898–1984), Director of Personnel, War Office
- Brigadier-General Sir Alfred Granville Balfour (1858–1936), Commander of Embarkation, Port of Southampton
- Brigadier Edward William Sturgis Balfour (1884–1955), Scots Guards
- General James Balfour (1743–1823), Colonel of the 83rd Regiment
- Major-General James Melville John Balfour (1951—), Director of Infantry
- General Nisbet Balfour (1743–1823), Colonel of the 39th (Dorsetshire) Regiment of Foot
- Lieutenant-General Sir Philip Balfour (1898–1977), GOC Northern Command
- Lieutenant-General Robert Balfour, 6th of Balbirnie (1772–1837), Colonel of the Fife Light Horse
- Brigadier Anthony David Ball (died 2025), Royal Electrical and Mechanical Engineers
- Brigadier Bernard Fergusson, Baron Ballantrae (1911–1980), Governor-General of New Zealand
- Brigadier-General Colin Robert Ballard (1868–1941), Officer Commanding No 2 District, Scottish Command
- Brigadier Derrick Peter Ballard, Royal Electrical & Mechanical Engineers
- Lieutenant-General John Archibald Ballard (1829–1880), Indian Army
- Lieutenant-General Sir Henry Balneavis KH OBE (1776–1857), Colonel of the 65th Regiment
- Brigadier Richard Fenwick Baly, Military attaché to Washington
- Major-General Harold John Kinahan Bamfield CB DSO (1870/71—1959), Indian Medical Service; deputy director of Medical Services, Eastern Command (India)
- Lieutenant-General William Charles Bancroft (d.1903), Bedfordshire Regiment
- Major-General Sir Richard Bannatine-Allason (1855–1940), GOC, 64th (2nd Highland) Division
- Lieutenant-General Sir Colin Barber (1897–1964), GOC Scottish Command
- Brigadier Michael Lovat Barclay (1932–2022), Commander Dubai Defence Force
- Brigadier Neil Barclay (1919/20—2011)
- Brigadier Alan Barker (1898–1984), Indian Army
- Brigadier Charles Norman Barker (1919–1998), Gordon Highlanders
- Brigadier Eric Hugh Barker (1939–2024), Deputy Engineer-in-Chief
- General Sir Evelyn Barker (1894–1983), GOC Eastern Command
- Brigadier Francis Brock Barker (1893–1958), Chief Engineer, South Wales District
- General Sir George Digby Barker (1833–1914), Commander British Forces in Hong Kong
- Brigadier-General Sir George Robert Barker (1817–1861), Royal Artillery
- Lieutenant-General Michael Barker (1884–1960), GOC Aldershot Command
- Brigadier-General Randle Barnett Barker (1870–1918), Commander 99th Brigade
- Brigadier-General Sir Robert Barker, 1st Baronet (1732–1789), Commander-in-Chief, India
- Brigadier Wardle Robson Barker CBE (1937–2019), Director of Transport Operations, Royal Corps of Transport
- Brigadier Desmond Alfred Barker-Wyatt (1924–2009), Commanding officer, 29th Engineer Brigade
- General Sir Andrew Barnard (1773–1855), Colonel-Commandant, The Rifle Brigade
- General Sir Charles Loudon Barnard KCB (1823–1902), Royal Marine Artillery
- Lieutenant-General Sir Edward Barnes (1776–1838), Commander-in-Chief, India
- Major-General Sir Reginald Barnes (1871–1946), GOC 55th (West Lancashire) Division
- Brigadier Andrew John Pooler Barr (1966-)
- Major-General John Alexander James Pooler Barr (1939—), Engineer-in-Chief
- Field Marshal Sir Arthur Barrett (1857–1926), GOC Northern Command (India)
- Major-General the Honourable John Barrington (c.1722–1764), Colonel of the 8th (The King's) Regiment of Foot
- Major-General Sir Harry Barron (1847–1921), Governor of Western Australia
- Brigadier-General Netterville Guy Barron, (1867–1945), Royal Garrison Artillery
- Major-General Richard Edward Barron (1940—), Director, Royal Armoured Corps
- General Sir Richard Barrons (1959—), Commander, Joint Forces Command
- General Sir Edmund Barrow (1852–1934), Military Secretary to the India Office
- General Sir George Barrow (1864–1959), GOC-in-C, Eastern Command (India)
- Major-General Harold Percy Waller Barrow (1876–1957), Colonel Commandant, Royal Army Medical Corps
- Major-General Charles W. Barry (1829–1902), Royal Engineers
- Major-General Christopher Brendan Kevin Barry (1971—), Director, Land Warfare
- Major-General Philip Barry, Royal Engineers
- Major-General Arthur Edward Barstow (1888–1942), GOC 9th Infantry Division (India)
- Major-General Sir Charles St Leger Barter (1857–1931), GOC 47th (1/2nd London) Division
- Major-General Arthur Wollaston Bartholomew (1878–1945), Commander British Troops in China
- General Sir William Bartholomew (1877–1962), GOC Northern Command
- Major-General John Leonard Bartlett, Colonel-Commandant, Royal Army Pay Corps
- Lieutenant-General Charles Barton (1760–1819), 2nd Regiment of Life Guards
- Major-General Eric Walter Barton (1928–2016), Colonel-Commandant, Royal Engineers
- Major-General Francis Christopher Barton CB CBE, 40 Commando RM (Malaya), Royal Marines
- Brigadier Francis Guy Barton, Royal Engineers
- Major-General Sir Geoffrey Barton (1844–1922), Colonel of the Royal Fusiliers
- Brigadier Sir Walter Barttelot, Bt. (1904–1944), CO 6th Guards Tank Brigade
- Lieutenant-General James Bashall (1962—), Commander Home Command
- Brigadier-General George Limbrey Sclater-Booth, 2nd Baron Basing (1860–1919), 1st The Royal Dragoons
- Major-General John Baskervyle-Glegg MBE (1940–2004), Grenadier Guards
- Major-General George Edward Restalick Bastin (1902–1960), Assistant Controller of Munitions, Ministry of Supply
- Lieutenant-General Sir Edric Bastyan (1903–1980), Commander British Forces in Hong Kong
- Brigadier Valerie Batchelor CBE, Adjutant General's Corps (staff and personnel support)
- Major-General Christopher Bate, Commandant, National Defence College
- Major-General William Bate (1920–2008), Director of Movements
- Major General Tom Bateman, GOC 1st Division
- Brigadier-General Hugh Bateman-Champain (1869–1933), Commanding officer of the 36th Indian Brigade
- General Charles Edward Bates (1827–1902), Madras Staff Corps
- Brigadier-General Sir Charles Loftus Bates (1863–1951), Northumberland Hussars
- Major-General John Bates (c. 1823–1902), Indian Army
- Major-General Sir John Bates (1911–1992), Colonel Commandant, Royal Artillery
- Lieutenant-General Sir Ben Bathurst (1962—), UK Military Representative to NATO
- Brigadier Neil Baverstock OBE, Royal Irish Regiment Late commander 145 brigade south andYeoman usher to the house of lords
- Brigadier Anthony Eric Baxter (1930–2021), Royal Electrical and Mechanical Engineers
- Brigadier Gordon Baxter (−2014), Director Army Catering Corps
- Brigadier James Robert John Baxter OBE, Royal Artillery
- Brigadier-Gerald Edward Bayley (1874 – ?), Commanding Officer, 65th Brigade
- Brigadier Joseph Herbert Bayley (1890–1964), CO, 145th Field Ambulance; CO, 70th General Hospital Vienna
- Lieutenant-General Sir Henry Bayly, GCH (1769–1846), Lieutenant Governor of Guernsey
- General John Bayly (1821–1905), Colonel Commandant of the Royal Engineers
- Brigadier Derrick Hubert Baynham (1924–2006), Chief Signals Officer, UK Land Forces
- General Sir Hugh Beach (1923–2019), Master-General of the Ordnance
- Brigadier Herbert Dacres Beadon (1895–1956), Signal Officer in Chief, Army Headquarters India
- Major-General Daniel Marcus William Beak VC (1891–1967), GOC Malta Command
- Lieutenant General Sir Peter Beale (1934—), Surgeon-General
- Brigadier-General Desmond Beale-Browne (1870–1953), Commander 2nd Cavalry Brigade
- Major-General Edmund Charles Beard (1894–1974), Colonel of the South Lancashire Regiment
- Major-General Simon John Beardsworth CB (1929–2019), Royal Tank Regiment
- Major-General Sir Guy Beatty (1870–1954), Regimental Colonel of the 4th Horse (Hodson's Horse)
- General Henry Lygon, 4th Earl Beauchamp (1784–1863), Colonel of the 10th Royal Hussars
- Major-General Frederick Beaumont-Nesbitt (1893–1971), Director of Military Intelligence
- General Sir Arthur Mitford Becher (1816-1887), Bengal Army
- Brigadier Ralph Frederick Richard Becher (1896–1979), Deputy Director of Organisation, War Office
- Major-General Edward Beck (1880–1974), GOC 9th (Highland) Infantry Division
- Major-General Clifford Thomason Beckett (1891–1972), Royal Artillery
- Brigadier Clive William Beckett (1935–2021), Director of Operational Requirements
- Major-General Denis Arthur Beckett CB DSO OBE (1917–2016), Director of Personal Services
- Major-General Edwin Beckett (1937–2018), Head of British Defence Staff – US
- Lieutenant-General Sir Tom Beckett (1962—), Defence Senior Advisor Middle East
- Brigadier-General William Beckett (1862–1956), Commander of the British Military Railway Mission in Siberia and Manchuria
- Brigadier-General Arthur Thackeray Beckwith (1876–1942), GOC 153rd Infantry Brigade
- General Sir George Beckwith (1753–1823), Commander-in-Chief, Ireland
- Lieutenant-General Sir Thomas Sydney Beckwith (1770–1831), Commander-in-Chief, Bombay Army
- Major-General Merton Beckwith-Smith (1890–1942), GOC 18th Infantry Division
- Brigadier Sir Edward Henry Lionel Beddington (1884–1966), Home Guard, War Office, (1940–1945)
- Brigadier Davis Evan Bedford (1898–1978), Royal Army Medical Corps
- Major-General John Hay Beith (1876–1952), Director of Army Public Relations
- Lieutenant-General Sir Herbert Belfield (1857–1934), GOC 4th Infantry Division
- Major-General Christopher James Bell (1972—), GOC Army Recruiting and Initial Training
- General Edward Wells Bell (c.1789—1870), Colonel of the 66th (Berkshire) Regiment of Foot
- Major-General Edward William Derrington Bell (1824–1879), Royal Welch Fusiliers
- General Sir John Bell (1782–1876), Colonel of the 4th (The King's Own) Regiment of Foot
- Major-General Thomas Carlyle Bell (died 1903), Bombay Staff Corps
- Major-General John Bellasis (1743–1808), Commander-in-Chief, Bombay Army
- General Joseph Harvey Bellasis (1759–1799), Indian Army
- Brigadier-General Sir Edward Bellingham, 5th Baronet (1879–1956), CO, 118th Brigade
- Brigadier John Meredith Bellman M.C. (1920–1988), Aide-de-Camp to Queen Elizabeth II, Royal Artillery
- Major-General Robert Benbow (1933–2014), Colonel Commandant, Royal Corps of Signals
- Major-General Sir Harcourt Mortimer Bengough (1837–1922), Commander, Jamaica
- Brigadier Barry William Bennett (1969—), Commander, British Forces in the South Atlantic Islands.
- Brigadier Jeremy Matthew James Bennett (1968—), CO 1st Artillery Brigade
- Brigadier Lawrence Peter Bennett, Royal Engineers
- Lieutenant-General George Benson (1750–1814), Captain: 44th (East Essex) and 66th (Berkshire) Regiment of Foot
- General Henry Roxby Benson (1818–1892), Colonel of the 7th Queen's Own Hussars
- Major-General Peter Herbert Benson (1923–2016), Director General of Transport & Movements (Army)
- Lieutenant-General Lord William Bentinck (1774–1839), Commander-in-Chief, India
- Lieutenant-General Lord George Beresford (1781–1839), Colonel of the 3rd (The King's Own) Regiment of (Light) Dragoons
- General William Beresford, 1st Viscount Beresford (1768–1854), Master-General of the Ordnance
- Lieutenant-General Sir Noel Beresford-Peirse (1887–1953), GOC Southern Command (India)
- General Sir George Berkeley (1785–1857), Surveyor-General of the Ordnance
- Major-General Horatio Berney-Ficklin (1892–1961), GOC 55th (West Lancashire) Infantry Division
- Lieutenant-General Sir Gerald Berragan (1958—), Adjutant-General to the Forces
- Lieutenant-General Sir Edward Cecil Bethune (1855–1930), Director-General, Territorial Force
- Brigadier John Bryan Bettridge CBE (1932—), Commandant, Royal School of Artillery
- Brigadier Michael William Betts, Chief Transport and Movements Officer, British Army of the Rhine
- Brigadier Francis Bevan, Commander, Royal Engineers 1st Corps
- Brigadier Timothy David Vaughan Bevan (1939—2026), CO, 15th Infantry Brigade
- Lieutenant-General Sir Henry Beverley (1935—), Commandant General Royal Marines
- Major-General Timothy John Bevis (1963—), Royal Marines, Director Operations and Planning Division, International Military Staff, NATO HQ
- Brigadier William Patrick Bewley (1937– 2024), Commandant, Central Ordnance Depot, Bicester
- Major-General William Howell Beynon
- General Sir Michael Biddulph (1823–1904), GOC Rawalpindi Division
- General Sir Robert Biddulph (1835–1918), Quartermaster-General to the Forces
- General Sir Thomas Myddelton Biddulph (1809–1878), 7th Light Dragoons
- Brigadier Bernard Reginald Biggs (1927/8—2021), Deputy Director-General Royal Army Ordnance Corps
- Lieutenant-General Sir David Bill (1954— ), Commandant Royal College of Defence Studies
- Major-General the Honourable Sir Cecil Bingham (1861–1934), GOC 67th (2nd Home Counties) Division
- Major-General the Honourable Sir Francis Richard Bingham (1863–1935), Lieutenant Governor of Jersey
- Brigadier-General George Baillie-Hamilton, Lord Binning (1856–1917), CO, 11th Mounted Brigade
- Major-General Graham Binns (1957— ), Commandant, Joint Services Command and Staff College
- General Sir Noel Birch (1865–1939), Master-General of the Ordnance
- General Sir Richard James Holwell Birch (1803–1875), Bengal Army
- Lieutenant-General Sir Clarence Bird (1885–1986), Colonel Commandant, Royal Engineers
- Major-General Sir Wilkinson Bird (1869–1943), Colonel of the 2nd (The Queen's Royal) Regiment of Foot
- Brigadier-General Halhead Brodick Birdwood (1870–1939), CO, 12th Indian Cavalry Brigade
- Field Marshal William Birdwood, 1st Baron Birdwood (1865–1951), Commander-in-Chief, India
- Major-General Theodore Birkbeck (1911–1976), Director-General, Territorial Army
- Brigadier Alexander Birtwistle (1948— ), CO 42 (North West) Brigade
- Major-General Archibald Cull Birtwistle (1927–2009), Signal Officer-in-Chief
- Brigadier-General Arthur Birtwistle (1877–1937), 210th (East Lancashire) Brigade
- Brigadier Harry Wilkinson Bishop, Director, Army Veterinary and Remount Services
- Major-General Frederic William Lyon Bissett (1888–1961), Officer Commanding West Scotland Area
- Brigadier William James Bittles (1935/6-2025), Military Attache, Russia
- Major-General Sir Wilsone Black (1837–1909), Commander British Forces in Hong Kong
- Major-General Charles Blackader (1869–1921), GOC, 38th (Welsh) Infantry Division
- General Sir Cecil Blacker (1916–2002), Adjutant-General
- General Sir Jeremy Blacker (1939–2015), Master-General of the Ordnance
- Major-General Cyril Blacklock (1880–1936), GOC 63rd (Royal Naval) Division
- Major-General Nathaniel Blackwell, Governor and Commander in Chief of the Island of Tobago
- Brigadier Paddy Blagden (1935–2020), Royal Engineers, son of Brigadier William Martin Blagden
- Brigadier William Martin Blagden (1899–1949), Deputy Chief Engineer of the Fighting Vehicle Design Establishment
- Lieutenant-General Sir Chandos Blair (1927–2002), GOC Scotland
- General James Blair VC CB (1828–1905), Colonel of the 32nd Lancers
- Field Marshal Sir Edward Blakeney (1778–1868), Commander-in-Chief, Ireland
- Lieutenant-General William Blakeney, 1st Baron Blakeney (1672–1761), Colonel, 27th Foot
- Brigadier Gerald Blakey, Royal Engineers
- Major-General John Blakiston-Houston (1881–1959), GOC Midland Area
- Major General Dan Blanchford, Commander of the Afghan Resettlement Programme
- Lieutenant-General Humphrey Bland (1686–1763), Commander-in-Chief, Scotland
- Brigadier-General William St Colum Bland (1868–1950), Royal Artillery
- Major-General Robert Stuart, 11th Lord Blantyre (1777–1830)
- Lieutenant-General Andrew Blayney, 11th Baron Blayney (1770–1834), 89th Regiment of Foot
- Major-General Robert Sidney Blewett, Honorary Physician to the Queen
- Lieutenant-General the Honourable Edward Bligh (1769–1840)
- Lieutenant-General Thomas Bligh (1685–1775)
- Major-General Adam Block (1908–1994), GOC Malta Command
- Brigadier David Block CBE DSO MC (1908–2001), Royal Artillery
- General Sir Thomas Blomefield, 1st Baronet (1744–1822)
- General Sir Bindon Blood (1842–1940), Chief Royal Engineer
- Lieutenant-General Benjamin Bloomfield, 1st Baron Bloomfield (1768–1846), Commanding Officer, Woolwich Garrison
- General Sir John Bloomfield (c.1793—1880), Master Gunner, St James's Park
- Brigadier John Barry Bloxham CBE (1937—), Army Catering Corps
- Major-General Richard Blundell Blundell-Hollinshead-Blundell
- Brigadier Jasper Scawen Blunt (1898–1968), Royal Artillery
- Major-General Peter Blunt (1923–2003), Assistant Chief of Defence Staff (Personnel and Logistics)
- General Richard Blunt (1770–1859), Colonel of the 66th Foot
- Major-General Barrington Campbell, 3rd Baron Blythswood (1845–1918), Lieutenant Governor of Guernsey
- Major-General Colin Boag CB CBE LOM (1959— ), GOC Support Command
- Major-General Anthony Boam (1932–2023), Commander British Forces in Hong Kong
- Brigadier John William Boast (1926–2017), deputy director of Electrical and Mechanical Engineering (Engineering Policy)
- Major-General Eberhardt Otto George von Bock (1755–1814)
- Lieutenant-General Maurice Bocland (c.1695—1765), Colonel of the 11th Regiment of Foot
- Major-General Kenneth Marten Body (1883–1973), Colonel Commandant, Royal Army Ordnance Corps
- Brigadier Peter Richard Body, Royal Artillery
- Brigadier-General Guy Hamilton Boileau
- Brigadier Guy Boisragon, VC (1864–1931), 5th Gurkha Rifles
- Major-General Theodore Boisragon (1830–1882), Indian Army
- Major-General Eric Bols (1904–1985), GOC 6th Airborne Division
- Lieutenant-General Sir Louis Bols (1867–1930), GOC 43rd (Wessex) Infantry Division
- Lieutenant-General Charles Powlett, 3rd Duke of Bolton (1685–1754), Colonel of the Royal Horse Guards
- Lieutenant-General Charles Powlett, 5th Duke of Bolton (c. 1718–1765)
- Brigadier Lyndon Bolton (1899–1995), CRA, 15th (Scottish) Infantry Division
- Brigadier Ronald Dickeson Bolton, Commanding Officer, Kowloon Garrison (Hong Kong)
- Brigadier Charles Hendley Bond (1938–2018), 1st The Queen's Dragoon Guards
- Major-General Sir Frank Bond (1856–1930), Director of Quartering
- Brigadier-General Henry Bond (1873–1919), Royal Artillery
- Major-General (Henry) Mark Garneys Bond (1922–2017), Assistant Chief of the Defence Staff (Operations)
- Lieutenant-General Sir Lionel Vivian Bond (1884–1961), GOC Malaya Command
- Major-General Richard Lawrence Bond (1890–1971), GOC Nigeria
- Lieutenant-General Sir Charles Bonham-Carter (1876–1955), governor of Malta
- Major-General Peter Bonnet (1936–2023), GOC Western District
- Lieutenant-General Sir Derek Boorman (1930–2025), Chief of Defence Intelligence
- Major-General John Boothby (1824–1876), Royal Artillery
- Major-General Hugh Borradaile (1907–1993), Vice-Adjutant General
- Major-General Herbert Charles Borrett (1841–1919), Inspector-General of Recruiting and the Auxiliary Forces
- Lieutenant-General Sir Oswald Borrett (1878–1950), Commander British Troops in China
- General Sir Arthur Borton (1814–1893), Governor of Malta
- Brigadier-General Neville Travers Borton (1870–1938), Military Governor of Jerusalem
- Brigadier Thomas Bosvile (1897–1945), acting GOC 1st Armoured Division
- Lieutenant-General Sir Alexander Boswell, (1928–2021), Lieutenant Governor of Guernsey
- Brigadier Carl Boswell, CO 20th Armoured Brigade Combat team
- Major-General Sir Charles Hamilton Boucher (1898–1951), GOC Malaya Command
- Major-General John Boughey, (1845–1932), Wiltshire Regiment
- Brigadier Hereward Emanuel (Bill) Boulter DSO, Infantry
- Lieutenant-General Eustace Fane Bourchier CB Legion of Honour (France) (1822–1902), Royal Engineers
- General Sir Richard Bourke (1777–1855), Colonel of the 64th (2nd Staffordshire) Regiment of Foot
- General Sir Alan Bourne (1882–1967), Adjutant-General Royal Marines
- General Geoffrey Bourne, Baron Bourne (1902–1982), Commandant of the Imperial Defence College
- Brigadier Jonny Bourne, CO 7th Infantry Brigade and Headquarters East
- Lieutenant-General Sir Henry Bouverie (1783–1852), Governor of Malta
- Major-General Bryan Morris Bowen CB (1932–2021), Colonel Commandant, Royal Army Pay Corps
- Major-General Esmond John Bowen (1922–2006), Director, Royal Army Dental Corps
- Major-General William Bowen (1898–1961), Director of Signals
- Lieutenant-General Sir Roger Bower (1903–1990), C-in-C, Middle East Land Forces
- Major-General Barnard Foord Bowes (1769–1812), Peninsular War
- Major-General Sir James Bowes-Lyon (1917–1977), GOC London District
- General Sir George Bowles (1787–1876), Colonel of the 1st West India Regiment
- Major-General Robert Bowles (1744–1812), Commander in Chief, Bombay Army
- Major-General John Francis Bowman, Director General Army Legal Corps
- Major-General Sir Graham Bowman-Manifold (1871–1940), Colonel Commandant, Royal Engineers
- Major-General John Humphrey Stephen Bowring (1913–1998), Engineer-in-Chief
- Brigadier Peter Christopher Bowser CBE (1930–2021), Royal Corps of Transport
- Major-General Sir Gerald Boyd (1877–1930), Military Secretary
- Brigadier Sir John Boyd (1891–1981), Director of Pathology, War Office.
- Lieutenant-General Sir Robert Boyd (c. 1710–1794), Governor of Gibraltar
- Lieutenant-General the Honourable Sir Thomas Boyd-Carpenter (1938— ), Deputy Chief of the Defence Staff (Personnel and Training)
- Brigadier-General Lionel Boyd Boyd-Moss (1875–1940), CO 36th Brigade
- Lieutenant-General Charles Boye, Commander in Chief, Bombay Army
- Brigadier Edward Thomas Arthur George Boylan (1894–1959), Commander Royal Artillery, 59th Infantry Division
- Major-General Anthony Hugh Boyle CB (1941–2011), Signal-Officer-in-Chief
- Major-General John Boyne, Director-General, Royal Electrical and Mechanical Engineers
- General Sir Henry Brackenbury (1837–1914), Colonel Commandant, Royal Artillery
- Brigadier Ray Bradbury (1943–2022), Royal Engineers
- Major-General Edward Braddock (1695–1755), Commander-in-Chief, North America
- Brigadier Bill Bradford (1912–1996), CO 153rd (Highland) Infantry Brigade
- General Sir John Fowler Bradford (1805–1889), Indian Army
- Brigadier-General Roland Boys Bradford (1892–1917), CO 186th (2/2nd West Riding) Brigade
- General Sir Thomas Bradford (1777–1853), Commander-in-Chief, Bombay Army
- Major-General Peter Bradley (1914–2010), Chief of Staff, Allied Forces Northern Europe
- General Sir Adrian Bradshaw (1958— ), Deputy Supreme Allied Commander Europe
- Lieutenant-General Sir Richard Bradshaw (1920–1999), Director General Army Medical Services
- Major-General John Bradstreet (1714–1774), 40th Regiment of Foot
- Major-General Derek Henry Braggins CB, Director of Transport and Movements
- Major-General Sir John Braithwaite, 1st Baronet (1739–1803), Commander-in-Chief, Madras Army
- General Sir Walter Braithwaite (1865–1945), Adjutant-General to the Forces
- Brigadier-General William Garnett Braithwaite (1870–1937), CO 16th Infantry Brigade
- Field Marshal Edwin Bramall, Baron Bramall (1923–2019), Chief of the Defence Staff
- Major-General William James Frank Bramble (1966— ), Chief of Staff, Allied Rapid Reaction Corps
- Major-General Ronald Bramwell-Davis (1905–1974), GOC Aldershot District
- Brigadier Ivo Branch (1851–1928) CB CVO
- Air Vice Marshal (previously Major-General) Sir Sefton Brancker (1877–1930), Royal Flying Corps
- Brigadier-General the Honourable Roger Brand (1880–1945), Rifle Brigade
- Major-General Maxwell Spieker Brander (1884–1972), Colonel-Commandant, Royal Army Service Corps
- Major-General Paul Sheldon Bray (died 2012), Paymaster-in-Chief
- General Sir Robert Bray (1908–1983), Deputy Supreme Allied Commander Europe
- Major-General Sir Rupert Brazier-Creagh (1909–2002), Director of Staff Duties
- Lieutenant-General John Campbell, 1st Marquess of Breadalbane (1762–1834), CO, Breadalbane Fencibles
- Major General Bruce Brealey (1959— ), Director General, Capability
- Major-General Bala Bredin (1916–2005), GOC North West District
- Brigadier-General Richard William Breeks (1863–1920), Royal Horse Artillery
- Lieutenant-General Robert Brereton (1747–1815), Governor of St Lucia
- Lieutenant-General Sir William Brereton (1789–1864), Colonel-Commandant, IV Brigade, Royal Horse Artillery
- General Henry William Breton (1799–1889), GOC, South-West District
- Lieutenant-General Martin Bricknell (1963— ), Surgeon General of the British Armed Forces
- Brigadier John William Bridge CBE, Royal Engineers
- Brigadier the Honourable Geoffrey Bridgeman (1898–1974), Royal Army Medical Corps
- Major-General Robert Bridgeman, 2nd Viscount Bridgeman (1896–1982), deputy adjutant-general to the War Office
- Lieutenant-General Sir Tom Bridges (1871–1939), GOC 19th (Western) Division
- Brigadier-General Robert James Bridgford (1869–1954), GOC 31st Division
- General Alexander Hood, 1st Viscount Bridport (1814–1904), Royal Scots Fusiliers
- Lieutenant-General Sir Charles James Briggs (1865–1941), GOC, XVI Corps
- Major-General George Briggs (1808–1875), Madras Artillery
- Lieutenant-General Sir Harold Rawdon Briggs (1894–1952), GOC, Burma Command
- Major-General Raymond Briggs (1895–1985), GOC,1st Armoured Division
- General Sir Robert Onesiphorus Bright (1823–1896), Colonel, The Princess of Wales's Own (Yorkshire Regiment)
- Lieutenant-General Robin Brims (1951— ), Commander, Field Army
- General Sir James Brind (1808–1888), Colonel-Commandant, Royal Artillery
- General Sir John Brind (1878–1954), GOC, Southern Command (India)
- Major-General Sir Thomas Brisbane (1773–1860), Governor of New South Wales
- Major-General Horton Brisco (1741–1802), Coldstream Guards and/or EICS
- Brigadier Anthony William Edmund Brister (1952— ), Adjutant General's Corps (Educational and Training Services Branch)
- Brigadier Andrew Bristow (1963— ), Capability Director, Information
- Major-General Charles Gisborne Brittan (1860–1939), Royal Marines
- Major-General Robert Britten (1922–1995), GOC, West Midlands District
- Major-General Francis Gerrard Russell Brittorous (1896–1974), GOC, Aegean
- Lieutenant-General Sir Charles Broad (1882–1976), GOC, Eastern Army, India
- Major-General Sir Edward Broadbent (1875–1944), Lieutenant Governor of Guernsey
- Lieutenant-General Robert Broadwood (1862–1917), GOC, 57th (2nd West Lancashire) Division
- Brigadier-General Henry Jenkins Brock (1870–1933), CO, Welsh Border Infantry Brigade (Territorial Army)
- Major-General Sir Isaac Brock (1769–1812), Lieutenant-Governor of Upper Canada
- Major-General John Myles "Robin" Brockbank (1921–2006), Vice-Adjutant General
- Brigadier Ralph Alexander Broderick (1888–1971), Consulting Dental Surgeon to the Army
- Major-General Thomas Brodie (1903–1993), GOC, 1st Infantry Division
- General the Honourable John Brodrick (1765–1842), Governor of Martinique
- Major-General Robert Straton Broke (1913–2002), Colonel-Commandant, Royal Artillery
- Major-General Sir Charles Broke Vere (1779–1843)
- Major-General Joseph Brome (c. 1713–1796), Master Gunner, St James's Park
- Brigadier Robert Bromham (?—1980), Royal Army Ordnance Corps
- Brigadier David de Gonville Bromhead CBE LVO (1944—), Royal Regiment of Wales
- Brigadier-General Walter Bromilow (1863–1939), GOC, 137th (Staffordshire) Infantry Brigade
- Brigadier-General Sir William Bromley-Davenport (1862–1949), CO, 22nd Mounted Brigade
- Major-General Frank Hastings Brooke (1909–1982), Federation Army of Malaya
- Brigadier-General Hugh Fenwick Brooke (1871–1948), deputy director of Supplies, GHQ France
- Brigadier Oliver George Brooke (1911–1987), Welch Regiment
- Air Chief Marshal (formerly Brigadier-General) Sir Robert Brooke-Popham (1878–1953), Commander-in-Chief, British Far East Command
- Major-General Patrick Brooking (1937–2014), Commandant, British Sector in Berlin
- General Sir Thomas William Brotherton (1782–1868), Regimental Colonel, 1st (The King's) Dragoon Guards
- Major-General William Edward Delves Broughton (1837–1895), Bengal Army
- Brigadier Alan Brown (1909–1971), CO, 31st Armoured Brigade
- Lieutenant-General Chris Brown (1955— ), Senior British Military Representative, Multi-National Force – Iraq
- Brigadier Edward David Brown (born 1960), Commander, British Military Mission, Kuwait
- Brigadier Ernest Henry Brown
- General Sir George Brown (1790–1865), Commander-in-Chief, Ireland
- Brigadier Harry Gregorius Brown, Royal Army Ordnance Corps
- Major-General James Brown
- Lieutenant-General Sir John Brown (1880–1958), Director-General, Territorial Army
- Brigadier John Brown (1923–2008), Commandant, Scottish Cadet Force
- Major-General Michael Brown (1931–1993), Director of Army Medicine
- Brigadier Tweedie Brown CBE (1948— ), Commandant, Royal Logistic Corps Training Centre
- Major-General Edward George Browne (1863–1952), Royal Army Medical Corps
- Brigadier-General Edward Stevenson Browne VC (1852–1907), GOC North Eastern District
- Brigadier Hugh William Longbourne Browne (1924–2016), Chief Engineer, United Kingdom Land Forces
- Major-General Sir James Browne (1839–1896), Quartermaster General, India
- Brigadier Michael Anthony Browne, Royal Engineers
- Brigadier Michael Edward Browne (1942—), Honorary Colonel 3rd (Volunteer) Battalion, The Worcestershire and Sherwood Foresters Regiment
- Brigadier-General Montfort Browne (c.1735–1780), CO, The Prince of Wales' American Regiment
- General Sir Samuel Browne VC, GCB, KCSI (1824–1901), CO, Peshawar Valley Field Force
- Brigadier-General Robert Clayton Browne-Clayton (1870–1939), 5th Lancers
- Lieutenant-General Sir Frederick Browning (1896–1965), Military Secretary
- General Sir Nevil Brownjohn (1897–1973), Quartermaster-General to the Forces
- Brigadier Cecil Alexander Little Brownlow DSO, Royal Field Artillery
- Field Marshal Sir Charles Henry Brownlow (1831–1916), Indian Army
- Major-General William Vesey Brownlow (1841–1928), Colonel of the 1st King's Dragoon Guards
- Lieutenant-General Sir Douglas Brownrigg (1886–1946), Military Secretary
- General Sir Robert Brownrigg (1758–1833), General Officer Commanding, Ceylon
- Major General Alastair Bruce of Crionaich (1960—), governor of Edinburgh Castle
- Major General Bob Bruce, governor of Edinburgh Castle
- Brigadier-General The Honourable Charles Granville Bruce (1866–1939), CO, Bannu Brigade
- Major-General Sir David Bruce (1855–1931), Commander, Royal Army Medical College
- Brigadier Ian Robert Crauford George Mary Bruce (1890–1956), Queen's Own Cameron Highlanders
- Major-General The Honourable Robert Bruce (1813–1862), Grenadier Guards
- Brigadier-General Thomas Bruce, Royal Artillery
- Brigadier-General Capel Molyneux Brunker (1898–1988), CRA Eastern Command
- Major-General Sir James Milford Sutherland Brunker (1854–1942), GOC, Sirhind Brigade
- Major-General Sir Jeremiah Bryant (c.1783—1845), Bengal Army
- Major-General Sir Alexander Bryce (1766–1832), Inspector-General of Fortifications
- Brigadier Richard Hugh Castellain Bryers (1911–1997), The Kings Own Regiment
- Lieutenant-General Henry Buchanan (1830–1903), GOC, Eastern District
- Major-General Sir Kenneth Buchanan (1880–1973), GOC, 42nd (East Lancashire) Infantry Division
- General Sir Roy Bucher (1895–1980), Commander-in-Chief, Indian Army
- Brigadier Francis Edward Buckland (-1965), Royal Army Medical Corps
- Major-General Ronald John Denys Eden Buckland MBE, Coldstream Guards
- Major-General Christopher Reginald Buckle CB CMGLégion d'honneur, Military Order of Savoy, Croix de Guerre, Order of Leopold II, Order of the Crown of Italy (1862–1952)
- Major-General Denys Herbert Vincent Buckle CBE (1902–1994), Royal Army Service Corps
- Lieutenant-General Gerard Bucknall (1894–1980), GOC, Northern Ireland District
- Lieutenant-General Sir James Bucknall (1958—), Commander, Allied Rapid Reaction Corps
- General Sir Edward Bulfin (1862–1939), GOC, XXI Corps
- Major-General Charles Bullen-Smith (1898–1970), GOC, 51st (Highland) Division
- Lieutenant-General Frederick William Buller (1773–1855)
- General Sir George Buller (1802–1884), GOC, Southern District
- General Sir Redvers Buller (1839–1908), GOC, Aldershot Command
- Lieutenant-General Sir George Bullock (1851–1926), Governor of Bermuda
- Brigadier Robert Michael Bullock CBE (died 2022), Chief Transport and Movements Officer, British Army of the Rhine
- General Sir Edward Bulwer (1829–1910), Lieutenant Governor of Guernsey
- Brigadier-General William Earle Bulwer (1757–1807), Norfolk Rangers
- Brigadier Hetherington Bulwer-Long (1904–1989)
- Brigadier George Francis Bunbury (1895–1977), deputy director of Military Operations, Army Headquarters India
- Lieutenant-General Sir Henry Bunbury, 7th Baronet (1778–1860)
- Major-General Sir Herbert Napier Bunbury (1851–1922), Royal Artillery
- Brigadier Noël Louis St. Pierre Bunbury (1890–1971), ADC to King George VI
- Major-General Geoffrey Burch (1923–1990), Director-General of Weapons
- Major-General Keith Burch (1931–2013), Assistant Chief of the Defence Staff (Personnel and Logistics)
- Major-General David Burden (1943— ), Military Secretary
- Brigadier Brian Burditt
- Major-General Rodney Burges (1914–2002), Vice-Quartermaster-General
- General Sir Edward Burgess (1927–2015), Deputy Supreme Allied Commander Europe
- General John Burgoyne (1722–1792) Commander-in-Chief, Ireland
- Field Marshal Sir John Fox Burgoyne (1782–1871), Colonel Commandant, Royal Engineers
- Major-General Edward Burke-Gaffney (1900–1981), GOC Aldershot District
- Brigadier Alan David Burley, Inspector, Royal Army Ordnance Corps
- Major-General Shaun Burley (born 1962), Military Secretary
- Major-General Edwyn Sherard Burnaby (1830–1883), Honorary Colonel of the 1st Leicestershire Rifle Volunteer Corps
- Major-General Sir Owen Tudor Burne, GCIE KCSI (1837–1909), Indian Army
- General Sir Charles Burnett (1843–1915), GOC Western Command
- Major-General Edward John Sidney Burnett, Colonel, 10th Princess Mary's Own Gurkha Rifles
- Major-General Sir James Burnett, 13th Baronet (1880–1953), GOC, 51st (Highland) Division
- General Sir John Burnett-Stuart (1875–1958), GOC-In-C, Southern Command
- Major-General Sir John Francis Burn-Murdoch (1859–1931), Royal Dragoons
- Major-General Edward Lawson, 4th Baron Burnham (1890–1963), Director of Army Public Relations
- Major-General Sir George Burns (1911–1997), GOC, London District
- Brigadier Lionel Bryan (Byrne) Douglas Burns, CBE, DSO, MC (1895–1966), deputy director of Personnel Services, War Office
- Brigadier Paul Robert Burns, Director of Staff and Personnel Support
- General Sir Harry Burrard, 1st Baronet, of Lymington (1755–1813), Governor of Calshot Castle
- Brigadier-General Arnold Robinson Burrowes (1867–1949), Brigadier-General, Adjutant General's Department
- Lieutenant-General Brocas Burrows (1894–1967), GOC, West Africa Command
- Brigadier-General George Burrows (1827–1917), Indian Army
- Brigadier-General Alfred Burt, 7th Cavalry Brigade
- Brigadier Cedric James Burton (1950— ), Signal Officer-in-Chief
- Brigadier Colin Burton (born 1883), Army Service Corps
- General Edmond Francis Burton (1820–1902), Madras Army
- Lieutenant-General Sir Edmund Burton (1943— ), Deputy Chief of the Defence Staff
- Brigadier Ralph Burton (died 1768), Colonel of the 3rd Regiment of Foot
- Major-General Peter J. Bush OBE (1924–2009), Chief of Staff, SHAPE
- Major-General Sir Henry Bushman (1841–1940), Colonel, 9th (Queen's Royal) Lancers
- Major-General Leslie Francis Harry Busk (1937–2025), Director, Army Air Corps
- Brigadier-General Phillip Thomas Buston CB DSO (1853–1938), Chief Engineer, Aldershot Command
- Major-General Arthur Butcher, Royal Marines Light Infantry
- Brigadier Edward Adam Butler CBE DSO (born 1962), Chief, Joint Force Operations
- Major-General Ernest Reuben Charles Butler, Deputy Director Veterinary Services
- Major-General Hew Butler (1922–2007), General Officer Commanding, Near East Land Forces
- Lieutenant-General James Butler (died 1836), Lieutenant-Governor of the Royal Military College, Sandhurst
- Brigadier-General Lesley James Probyn Butler (1876–1955) CO, 94th (Yeomanry) Brigade
- General Sir Mervyn Butler (1913–1976), Commandant, Royal College of Defence Studies
- Lieutenant-General Sir Richard Butler (1870–1935), GOC, Western Command
- Major-General Stephen Butler (1880–1964), GOC 48th (South Midland) Division
- Lieutenant-General Sir William Butler (1838–1910), GOC, Western District
- Brigadier-General William John Chesshyre Butler, 5th Dragoon Guards
- Brigadier Michael Robert Butterwick (1970–), Commander, Initial Training Group
- Major-General William John Butterworth (1801–1856), governor of the Straits Settlements
- Field Marshal Julian Byng, 1st Viscount Byng of Vimy (1862–1935), GOC Third Army

== C ==
- General Sir George Cadogan (1814–1880), Colonel of the 71st (Highland) Regiment of Foot
- Lieutenant-General William Cadogan, 1st Earl Cadogan (c.1672–1726), Master-General of the Ordnance
- General William Martin Cafe, VC (1826–1906), Bengal Infantry
- Brigadier-General John Caillaud (1726–1812), Commander-in-Chief, India
- Major General Paul Andrew Cain (born 1962), Director and Chief Executive for Defence Healthcare
- Major-General Sir Granby Calcraft (1770–1820), Heavy Brigade
- Major-General Thomas Calcraft (c.1737–1783), colonel 79th regiment, 1778
- Major-General Sir Alexander Caldwell (1763–1839), Indian Army
- Major-General Frank Caldwell (1921–2014), Assistant Chief of the General Staff
- Major-General Michael Callan CB, Director Ordnance Services
- Lieutenant-General Sir Colin Callander (1897–1979), Military Secretary
- Major-General Thomas Calley (1856–1932), GOC, 60th (2/2nd London) Division
- Major-General Christopher George Callow CB OBE (born 1941), Chief Executive, Defence Medical Training Organisation
- Major-General Sir Charles Edward Callwell (1859–1928), Director of Military Intelligence
- Lieutenant-General Sir Harry Calvert (1763–1826), Adjutant-General
- Brigadier Mike Calvert
- Major-General Percy George Calvert-Jones (1894–1977), GOC, 4th Anti-Aircraft Group
- Field Marshal Prince Adolphus, Duke of Cambridge (1774–1850), Colonel of the Coldstream Guards
- Field Marshal Prince George, Duke of Cambridge (1819–1904), Commander-in-Chief of the Forces
- Brigadier Kenneth Came (1925–1986), ADC to the Queen
- Lieutenant-General Sir Alan Cameron of Erracht (1753–1828), 79th Regiment of Foot
- General Sir Alexander Cameron (1781–1850), colonel of the 74th (Highland) Regiment of Foot
- General Sir Archibald Cameron (1870–1944), GOC, Scottish Command
- General Sir Duncan Cameron (1808–1888), governor of the Royal Military Academy, Sandhurst
- Brigadier Iain Cameron (1943–2022), Provost Marshal (Army)
- Lieutenant-General Sir John Cameron (1773–1844), GOC Western District
- Major-General Neville Cameron (1873–1955), GOC 49th (West Riding) Infantry Division
- Brigadier Orford Somerville Cameron DSO (1878–1958), Royal Field Artillery
- General Sir William Gordon Cameron (1827–1913), Commander of British Troops in China, Hong Kong and the Straits Settlements
- General Sir Archibald Campbell, 1st Baronet (1769–1843), Commander of British Forces in the First Anglo-Burmese War
- Major-General Sir Archibald Campbell (1739–1791), colonel of the 74th (Highland) Regiment of Foot
- Major-General Charles Peter Campbell (died 2012)
- Lieutenant-General Sir Colin Campbell (1776–1847), General Officer Commanding, Ceylon
- General Sir David Campbell (1869–1936), GOC Aldershot Command
- Major-General Sir Douglas Campbell (1899–1980), GOC Aldershot District
- Major-General Sir Guy Campbell, 1st Baronet (1786–1849), Colonel, 3rd West India Regiment
- General Sir Henry Frederick Campbell (1769–1856), Colonel of the 25th Regiment of Foot
- Lieutenant-General Sir James Campbell (c.1680–1745), governor of Edinburgh Castle
- Major-General Sir James Campbell (c.1773–1835), General Officer Commanding, Ceylon
- Major-General Jock Campbell VC DSO & Bar MC (1894–1942), GOC 7th Armoured Division
- General Sir John Campbell (1802–1878), Indian Army
- Major-General Sir John Campbell, 2nd Baronet (1807–1855), GOC 4th Division
- Brigadier-General John Hasluck Campbell (1855–1921), GOC 54th (East Anglian) Infantry Division
- Brigadier-General John Vaughan Campbell VC CMG DSO (1876–1954), GOC 46th (North Midland) Division
- Brigadier Lorne MacLaine Campbell VC (1902–1991), CO, 13th Infantry Brigade
- Major-General Victor Campbell (1905–1990), Chief of Staff, HQ Scottish Command
- Lieutenant-General Sir Walter Campbell (1864–1936), Quartermaster-General to the Forces
- Lieutenant-General Sir William Pitcairn Campbell (1856–1923), GOC-in-C, Western Command
- Brigadier-General Douglas Campbell-Douglas (20th Laird of Mains) CB (1854–1927), CO, 217th Infantry Brigade
- Brigadier-General Fernand Gustave Eugene Cannot (1873–1941), Army Service Corps
- Brigadier William Douglas Cantley OBE, (died 2010), Royal Tank Regiment
- Brigadier-General George Augustus Stewart Cape (1867–1918), GOC 39th Division
- Lieutenant-General Sir David Capewell (born 1959), Chief of Joint Operations
- Major-General Nick Caplin
- Major-General Sir John Capper
- Major-General Sir Thompson Capper
- Major-General Duncan Capps
- Brigadier Simon Caraffi
- Lieutenant-General George Cardew
- Brigadier Ereld Boteler Wingfield Cardiff
- Lieutenant-General James Brudenell, 7th Earl of Cardigan
- Major-General Constantine Phipps Carey, CB (1835–1906), Royal Engineers
- Major-General George Glas Sandeman Carey
- Major-General George Jackson Carey
- General Henry Luttrell, 2nd Earl of Carhampton
- General Henry Alexander Carleton CB (1814–1900), Royal Artillery
- General Thomas Carleton
- General Sir Mark Carleton-Smith
- Major-General Sir Michael Edward Carleton-Smith
- Major-General Neil Carlier
- Major-General Ewan Carmichael
- Major-General Sir Sir James Carmichael-Smyth, 1st Baronet
- Brigadier-General John Carnac
- Lieutenant-General Sir Robin Carnegie
- Brigadier-General Arthur Dalzell, 13th Earl of Carnwath
- General Arthur Alexander Dalzell, 9th Earl of Carnwath
- Major-General John Carpenter CB CBE, Colonel Commandment, Royal Corps of Transport
- Lieutenant-General Laurence Carr
- Brigadier William Greenwood Carr
- Major-General Colin Edward George Carrington
- Lieutenant-General Sir Harold Carrington
- Brigadier-General John William Vincent Carroll
- Brigadier-General R. A. Carruthers
- Brigadier-General Charles Frederick Carson
- Brigadier-General Francis Charles Carter
- Brigadier Gerald Carter
- General Sir Nick Carter
- Major General Phil Carter
- Major-General George Carter-Campbell
- Lieutenant-General Sir Adrian Carton de Wiart
- Brigadier-General Garnier Norton Cartwright DSO, Royal Artillery
- Brigadier-General George Strachan Cartwright
- General William Cartwright
- General Sir Malcolm Cartwright-Taylor
- Field Marshal Michael Carver, Baron Carver
- Major-General Francis Casement (1881–1967)
- Field Marshal Sir James Cassels
- General Sir Robert Cassels
- Brigadier-General Hugh Gilbert Casson
- Major-General Alan Cathcart, 6th Earl Cathcart
- General Charles Cathcart, 2nd Earl Cathcart
- Lieutenant-General Charles Cathcart, 9th Lord Cathcart
- General the Hon. Sir George Cathcart
- General William Cathcart, 1st Earl Cathcart
- Major-General Albemarle Cator
- Brigadier Helen Cattanach
- Lieutenant-General James Caulfeild
- Brigadier-General James Edward Wilmot Smyth Caulfeild
- Brigadier Toby St. George Caulfeild
- Lieutenant-General Richard Lambart, 6th Earl of Cavan
- General Richard Lambart, 7th Earl of Cavan
- Field Marshal Rudolph Lambart, 10th Earl of Cavan
- Brigadier Joe Cavanagh DSO (Devon & Dorsets, The Rifles, served 1992–2013)
- Major-General Nick Cavanagh
- Major-General William Frederick Cavaye
- Lieutenant-General Sir Ian Cave KCB
- Brigadier John Raban Cave-Browne
- Brigadier Thomas Francis Cavenagh
- Major-General Sir Orfeur Cavenagh
- Brigadier-General Alfred Cavendish
- Field Marshal Lord Frederick Cavendish
- Brigadier-General Frederick William Lawrence Sheppard Hart Cavendish (1877–1931)
- General the Honourable Henry Cavendish
- Major-General Peter Boucher Cavendish OBE (1925–2011)
- Brigadier-General the Honourable William Edwin Cavendish MVO (1862–1931)
- Lieutenant-General Arthur Cavendish-Bentinck
- Major-General Douglas Edward Cayley
- Major-General Sir Walter de Sausmarez Cayley
- Brigadier Arnold Cazenove
- Brigadier-General Edward Challenor
- Lieutenant-General Douglas Chalmers
- General Sir Crawford Chamberlain
- Field Marshal Sir Neville Bowles Chamberlain
- Major General Peter Anthony Chambers
- Brigadier Samuel Craven Chambers
- Brigadier George des Champs Chamier
- Lieutenant-General Forbes Champagné (1754–1816) acting CinC India
- General Sir Josiah Champagné (1755–1840) GOC Ceylon
- Claude Raul Champion de Crespigny, 5th Baronet
- Brigadier-General Harry Anthony Chandos-Pole
- General George Nicolas Channer
- Major-General George Osborne De Renzy Channer
- Major-General Clive Chapman
- General Sir Edward Chapman
- Field Marshal Sir John Chapple
- Major-General William Caulfeild, 2nd Viscount Charlemont
- Lieutenant-General Sir Ronald Charles
- Brigadier-General John Charteris
- Brigadier James Kentish Chater
- General John Pitt, 2nd Earl of Chatham
- Brigadier George Chatterton
- General Sir James Chatterton, 3rd Baronet
- General Sir John Cheape
- Brigadier Daniel James Edward Cheesman
- Major-General Geoffrey Cheetham
- General Frederic Thesiger, 2nd Baron Chelmsford
- Brigadier John Norman Cheney
- Brigadier-General Charles Cavendish, 3rd Baron Chesham
- General Francis Rawdon Chesney
- Major-General Augustus Philips Chesshyre (1825–1891)
- Field Marshal Philip Chetwode, 1st Baron Chetwode
- Lieutenant-General Granville Chetwynd-Stapylton
- Major-General Ralph Chenevix-Trench
- Brigadier William Watson Cheyne (1920–1970), Commander, West Brigade, Borneo
- Major-General Robert Bruce Chichester (1825–1902), 81st Regiment of Foot
- Lieutenant-General Sir Maurice Chilton
- Lieutenant-General Edward Chippindall (1827–1902), Colonel of the Green Howards
- Major General James Chiswell
- Major-General Peter Chiswell (1930–2025)
- Major-General Sir Wyndham Childs
- Brigadier Iain David Cholerton CBE, Royal Regiment of Wales
- Brigadier Laurence Norman Cholmeley
- Brigadier-General Hugh Cecil Cholmondeley (1852–1941), City of London Imperial Volunteers
- Brigadier Arthur John Herbert Chope
- Brigadier Ian Alexander Christie
- General Sir Philip Christison, 4th Baronet
- Major-General John Churcher
- Brigadier Alec Palmer Fleetwood Churchill
- General Charles Churchill
- Lieutenant-General Charles Churchill
- Lieutenant-General George Churchill
- Major-General Tom Churchill
- Major-General Keith Harington Cima
- General John de Burgh, 13th Earl of Clanricarde
- Brigadier Alastair John McDougall Clark
- Acting Lieutenant-General John George Walters Clark
- Brigadier Percy William Clark MC, Royal Engineers
- Field Marshal Sir Alured Clarke
- Lieutenant-General Sir Andrew Clarke
- Brigadier Bowcher "Bowie"Campbell Senhouse Clarke DSO (1882—1969), Territorial Army, Aldershot Sub District
- General Sir Charles Clarke, 3rd Baronet
- Brigadier F. A. S. Clarke
- General George Calvert Clarke CB (1814–1900), Royal Scots Greys
- Brigadier-General Goland Vanhalt Clarke
- Major General Michael Hugo Friend Clarke
- Major-General Sir Stanley Calvert Clarke
- Lieutenant-General Sir Travers Clarke
- General Tredway Clarke (c. 1764—1858)
- Brigadier Frank Leonard Clarkson
- Lieutenant-General Sir John Clavering
- Major-General Patrick Fisher Claxton
- Brigadier Richard Anthony Clay
- Brigadier Sir Gilbert Clayton
- Lieutenant-General Jasper Clayton
- Lieutenant-General William Douglas Cleland ( —1848), Bengal Army
- Major-General Ralph Arthur Penrhyn Clements
- Brigadier Richard Martin Clements
- Brigadier-General William Fletcher Clemson DSO, York and Lancaster Regiment
- Lieutenant-General Josias Gordon Cloete
- General Henry Vane, 2nd Duke of Cleveland
- Brigadier Andrew Michael Cliffe CBE
- Brigadier-General Henry Clifford
- Major-General the Honourable Sir Henry Hugh Clifford, VC KCMG CB
- Brigadier-General Walter Rees Clifford
- General Sir Arthur Clifton
- Brigadier John "Johnny" Charles Clinch CBE
- General Sir Henry Clinton (1730–1795)
- Lieutenant-General Sir Henry Clinton (1771–1829)
- General Sir William Henry Clinton (1769–1846)
- Brigadier Archer Clive
- General Edward Clive
- Major-General Robert Clive, 1st Baron Clive
- Lieutenant-General Sir Sidney Clive
- General Sir Abraham Josias Cloëté
- Major-General Barry Close
- Major-General Richard Clutterbuck
- Major-General Walter Clutterbuck
- Field Marshal Colin Campbell, 1st Baron Clyde
- Major-General Basil Coad
- Major-General Ronald Edward Coaker, 17th/21st Lancers
- Major-General Sir Raymond Coate
- Brigadier Leonard Augustus Coates
- General Sir Alexander Cobbe
- Field Marshal Richard Temple, 1st Viscount Cobham
- Brigadier-General James Kilvington Cochrane
- Major-General Sir James Cockburn, 9th Baronet
- Brigadier Nicholas Cocking
- Brigadier Roland Maurice Cockman OBE
- Brigadier John Codner
- Lieutenant-General Sir Alfred Codrington
- Major-General Robert Codrington (1803–1895)
- General Sir William Codrington
- Major-General Clifford Coffin
- Major-General Sir Isaac Coffin
- Brigadier Edward Sacheverell D'Ewes Coke (1872–1941), GOC, 169th (3rd London) Brigade
- Major-General John Talbot Coke
- Brigadier George Anson Probyn Coldstream
- Lieutenant-General Sir George Cole
- Major-General Jonathan Cole
- General Sir Lowry Cole
- Lieutenant-General Sir Charles Coleman
- Lieutenant-General Sir Edwin Henry Hayter Collen
- Major-General David Bryan Hall Colley CB CBE, CC, Royal Corps of Transport
- Major-General Sir George Pomeroy Colley
- Major-General Angus Lyell Collier (1893–1971)
- Major-General Geoffrey Collin
- Brigadier-General Clennell William Collingwood
- Lieutenant-General Sir George Collingwood
- Brigadier Sydney Collingwood
- Brigadier William Alexander Carlton Collingwood
- Lieutenant General Charles Collins
- Major-General Robert Collins
- Major-General Thomas Bernard Collinson (1821–1902), Royal Engineers
- General George Thomas Colomb
- Major-General Sir Cyril Colquhoun
- Lieutenant-General Daniel Colquhoun ( —1848), plaque in Craig Parish Church
- Brigadier Edwin David Colthup
- General the Honourable Sir Charles Colville
- Major-General John Frederick Boyce Combe
- Field Marshal Stapleton Cotton, 1st Viscount Combermere
- Brigadier-General Charles William Compton
- General Sir Walter Congreve
- Lieutenant-General Sir William Congreve, 1st Baronet
- Field Marshal Prince Arthur, Duke of Connaught and Strathearn
- Field Marshal Henry Seymour Conway
- Major-General Michael Conway
- Lieutenant-General George Conyngham, 3rd Marquess Conyngham
- Major-General Robert Francis Leonard Cook, Signal Officer-in-Chief
- Brigadier-General Bertram Hewett Hunter Cooke
- Major-General Sir George Cooke
- Major-General Ronald Cooke
- Brigadier Edward Cunliffe Cooke-Collis
- Major-General Sir James Cooke-Collis
- General Sir George Cooper (1925–2020), Adjutant-General to the Forces
- Lieutenant-General John Cooper
- Major-General Kenneth Cooper
- Major-General Sir Simon Cooper
- General Eyre Coote
- Lieutenant-General Sir Eyre Coote, East India Company
- Sir John Cope
- Major-General Ian Copeland
- Brigadier Rory Sandham Copinger-Symes
- Lieutenant-General Sir Tom Copinger-Symes
- Brigadier Felix Alexander Vincent Copland-Griffiths MC, Welsh Guards
- Major-General Sir Robert Corbett
- Major-General Patrick Cordingley
- General James Edward Cordner (1829–1901), Indian Army
- Lieutenant-General Sir Roddy Cordy-Simpson
- General Edmund Boyle, 8th Earl of Cork
- Major-General Sir Charles Corkran
- Major-General Archibald Rae Cornock CB OBE, Royal Army Ordnance Corps
- Major-General Charles Gordon "Bill" Cornock
- General Charles Cornwallis, 1st Marquess Cornwallis
- Lieutenant-General Edward Cornwallis
- Major-General Stephen Cornwallis
- Major-General Philip James Gladstone Corp
- Major-General Sir Thomas Corsellis
- General John Rawlins Coryton
- Brigadier-General Edmund Costello VC CMG CVO DSO
- Major-General Eric Boyd Costin DSO, Manchester Regiment, West Yorkshire Regiment
- Major-General Reverend Algernon Edward Cottam
- Major-General Nicholas Cottam
- General Sir Arthur Cotton
- Major-General Charles McClintock Cotton (1821–1900), Honorary Major-General
- Lieutenant-General Sir Sydney Cotton
- Lieutenant-General Sir Willoughby Cotton
- Brigadier Arthur Foulkes Baglietto Cottrell DSO OBE (1891–1962)
- Major-General Robert Cottrell-Hill
- Brigadier Neil Couch
- Major-General Richard Short Couchman
- Major-General John Taylor Coull CB QHS, Royal Army Medical Corps
- Brigadier Eric Coultard CBE QHDS, Royal Army Dental Corps
- Brigadier-General Eric Joseph Coulthard Royal Electrical Mechanical Engineers
- Major-General Sir Victor Arthur Couper
- Brigadier-General Anthony Courage
- Major-General Walter James Courage CB MBE, 5th Royal Inniskilling Dragoon Guards
- Brigadier Colin Hunter Cowan
- Major-General David Tennant Cowan
- Brigadier "James" Alan Comrie Cowan CBE, 1st Royal Leicestershire Regiment
- Major-General James Michael Cowan
- General Sir Samuel Cowan
- General Sir John Cowans
- Lieutenant-General Sir Gary Coward
- Major-General Sir Ernest Marshall Cowell
- Major-General Sir John Clayton Cowell
- Brigadier Bernard Turing Vionnée Cowey DSO OBE (1911–1997)
- Brigadier Shawn Philip Cowlam CBE
- Lieutenant-General Sir John Cowley
- Major-General John Cain Cowley
- Major-General John Cowtan
- Brigadier-General Edgar William Cox
- General Sir Herbert Cox
- Lieutenant-General Sir John William Cox KCB (1821–1901), served in Afghanistan and in the Crimea War
- Major-General Sir Percy Cox
- Major-General William Reginald Cox
- Brigadier-General Eyre Crabbe
- Major-General Derek Thomas Crabtree CB, Duke of Edinburgh's Royal Regiment
- Major-General John Crackett
- Lieutenant-General Sir Richard Craddock
- General Sir James Henry Craig
- Major-General Peter Craig OStJ QHS (1939/40-2022)
- Brigadier-General Hugh Marjoribanks Craigie-Halkett
- Brigadier David Cranston
- Lieutenant-General Sir Charles Craufurd
- Major-General Sir George Standish Gage Craufurd, 5th Baronet
- General James Craufurd
- Major-General Robert Craufurd
- Major-General William Craven, 1st Earl of Craven
- Brigadier Sir Douglas Inglis Crawford CB DSO TD
- Major-General George Lindsay-Crawford, 22nd Earl of Crawford
- Lieutenant-General John Lindsay, 20th Earl of Crawford
- General Sir Kenneth Crawford
- Brigadier Charles Crawfurd
- Brigadier Frederick Peter Crawley
- Major-General Charles Fitzgerald Creagh (1838–1902), South Staffordshire Regiment
- General Sir O'Moore Creagh VC GCB GCSI (1848–1923)
- Major-General Sir Michael O'Moore Creagh KBE (1892–1970)
- Lieutenant-General Henry Hope Crealock
- General Sir Timothy Creasey
- Brigadier David Hector Craig Creswell
- Brigadier Henry Alastair Ferguson Crewdson
- Brigadier Wilson Theodore Oliver Crewdson
- General John Crewe, 2nd Baron Crewe
- Major-General Richard Crewe
- Lieutenant-General Richard Cripwell
- General Sir John Crocker
- Brigadier-General Henry Page Croft, 1st Baron Croft
- Brigadier-General Cyril Randell Crofton
- General John ffolliott Crofton (1800–1885)
- Major-General Sir Henry Leycester Croker CB
- Brigadier William Pennefather Croker
- Major General Darren Crook
- Major-General George Crookenden
- Lieutenant-General Sir Napier Crookenden
- Major-General William Crosbie
- Brigadier Walter Hugh Crosland
- Major-General Tim Cross
- Brigadier Edward Neufville Crosse CBE MC (1898-1970), Royal Artillery
- Major-General Ralph John Crossley
- Brigadier Roderick James Croucher CBE, Royal Electrical and Mechanical Engineers
- Major-General Joseph Crowdy
- Major-General Tony Crowfoot
- Brigadier-General Frank Percy Crozier
- Major-General John Cubbon
- General Sir Thomas Cubitt
- Major-General Sir William Cubitt
- Major-General David Mark Cullen
- General Prince William, Duke of Cumberland
- Brigadier-General Hanway Robert Cumming
- Major-General George Gordon Cunliffe (1829–1900), Bengal Staff Corps
- Brigadier-General Charles Cunliffe-Owen
- General Sir Alan Cunningham
- Major-General Sir Alexander Cunningham
- Lieutenant-General Sir Hugh Cunningham
- Brigadier-General Robert Cunningham
- General Sir Arthur Cunynghame
- General Alexander Cuppage
- General Sir Charles Cureton
- Brigadier Godfrey John Curl
- Brigadier Desmond Charles Curme
- Major-General Liam Diarmuid Curran
- Major-General Archibald Peter Neil Currie CB CBE, Royal Regiment of Artillery
- Brigadier-General Francis Algernon Curteis CB (1856–1928), Commanding Western Coast Defences, Western Command
- Brigadier Francis Cockburn Curtis
- Brigadier Geoffrey Basil Curtis
- Major-General Henry Curtis
- Major-General Reginald Curtis
- Major-General Sir Reginald Salmond Curtis
- Major-General Charles Ernest Edward Curtoys
- Major-General Gerald Cuthbert
- Lieutenant-General John "Salamander" Cutts, 1st Baron Cutts, Coldstream Guards
- General Sir Cornelius Cuyler, Bt.

== D ==
- Brigadier-General Evan Campbell da Costa
- General Henry Trevor, 21st Baron Dacre
- Field Marshal Sir Richard Dacres
- Major-General Sir George Charles D'Aguilar
- Lieutenant-General Sir James Charles Dalbiac
- Brigadier Tony Dalby-Welsh
- Brigadier Ian Conway Dale
- General George Ramsay, 9th Earl of Dalhousie
- Major-General Alister Dallas
- General Sir John Dalling, 1st Baronet
- Brigadier Peter Attwood Dally
- General Adolphus Dalrymple
- General Sir Hew Whitefoord Dalrymple, 1st Baronet
- General William Dalrymple
- Major-General Sir Charles James George Dalton, 26th Indian Infantry Division
- Major-General James Cecil Dalton
- Major-General John Cecil D'Arcy Dalton CB CBE
- Major-General Arthur Daly
- General Sir Henry Daly
- Major-General Henry Dalzell-Payne
- Brigadier James Drew Daniel
- Major-General Charles Daniell
- General Lord Dannatt
- Major-General Matthew Darby-Griffith
- Brigadier Sir Jeffrey Lionel Darell, 8th Baronet
- Brigadier-General William Darell
- Major-General Douglas Darling
- Major-General Sir Henry Darling KCB
- General Sir Kenneth Darling GBE KCB DSO
- General Sir Ralph Darling GCH
- General Sir Henry Charles Barnston Daubeney GCB (1810–1903), Border Regiment
- Brigadier Clendon Daukes, 4th/7th Royal Dragoon Guards
- Major-General Basil Davey
- Brigadier Kenneth John Davey CBE MC DL, Royal Regiment of Wales
- Major-General Alexander Davidson (ca 1827–1902), Royal Engineers, later Bombay Engineers
- Major-General Francis Davidson
- Brigadier James Vivian Davidson-Houston
- Brigadier Patrick Davidson-Houston
- General Sir Francis Davies
- Major-General Henry Rodolph Davies
- Brigadier Nicholas Roy Davies
- Major-General Peter Ronald Davies CB, 1st (United Kingdom) Division signals regiment, 12th Armoured Brigade Combat Team (United Kingdom), GOC Headquarters Wales
- Major-General Richard Hutton Davies
- Brigadier Eric Malcolm Davies-Jenkins OBE
- Brigadier Gris Davies-Scourfield
- Major-General Sir Jack d'Avigdor-Goldsmid
- Major-General Brian William Davis
- Major-General Dickie Davis
- Lieutenant-General Ed Davis
- Major-General Gronow Davis
- Major-General Sir John Davis KCB (1832–1901), commanded the troops at Malta (1884–1887), in command of the Dublin District (1887–1890), and of the Southern Regimental District (1893–1898)
- Brigadier Paul Norman Davis
- Brigadier George Mark Oswald Davy CB CBE DSO (1898–1983)
- Brigadier Hugh Frank Dawes
- Major-General Charles Tyrwhitt Dawkins
- Major-General Sir David Dawnay
- Major-General Guy Dawnay
- Brigadier Richard William Dawnay
- Major-General Bertrand Dawson, 1st Viscount Dawson of Penn
- Brigadier-General Sir Douglas Dawson
- Lieutenant-General Richard Dawson
- Major-General Vesey John Dawson
- General Charles Philip de Ainslie
- General Sir Henry de Bathe, 4th Baronet
- Brigadier-General Harry Simonds De Brett
- Brigadier Edward de Broe Ferguson
- General Sir Eric de Burgh
- Major-General John Cromie Blackwood De Butts
- Brigadier Vivian Leslie de Cordova MC, Royal Lancaster Regiment
- Major-General Thomas de Courcy Hamilton
- Major-General Edward Barrington de Fonblanque
- Major-General Philip de Fonblanque
- Major-General George Francis de Gex
- Major-General Sir Freddie de Guingand
- Brigadier Sir Ivan de la Bere
- General Sir Peter de la Billière
- General Oliver De Lancey Jr.
- Major-General Oliver De Lancey, Sr.
- Major-General Charles Sackville-West, 6th Earl De La Warr
- General Sir Beauvoir De Lisle
- Major-General Hugo de Pree
- General William FitzGerald-de Ros, 22nd Baron de Ros
- Lieutenant-General Dudley FitzGerald-de Ros, 24th Baron de Ros
- Brigadier-General Cecil de Sausmarez
- Major-General Cecil "Peter" Martin Fothergill Deakin CB CBE (1910–1992), 32nd Infantry Brigade (United Kingdom), 29th Infantry Brigade (United Kingdom), 56th (London) Infantry Division
- Major-General Gary Deakin
- Major-General George Dean Pitt
- Major-General Tony Deane-Drummond
- General Sir Charles Deedes
- Brigadier-General Sir Wyndham Deedes
- Major-General Henry James Degacher CB (1835–1902), Colonel of the South Wales Borderers
- General Henry Ivatt Delacombe
- Major-General Sir Rohan Delacombe
- Lieutenant-General Sir Walter Sinclair Delamain
- Lieutenant-General Sir Cedric Delves
- Brigadier Theodore Delves Broughton
- General Sir Miles Dempsey
- Lieutenant-General Sir Lewis Dening
- Major-General Roland Dening
- Lieutenant-General Sir Anthony Denison-Smith KBE DL
- Major-General Sir Thomas Dennehy
- Lieutenant-General Sir Reginald Denning
- Major-General Alastair Wesley Dennis CB OBE, Queen's Royal Lancers, 16th/5th The Queen's Royal Lancers
- Brigadier Peter Dennis
- Brigadier-General Bertie Coore Dent
- Major-General Jonathan Hugh Baillie Dent CB OBE, 1st The Queen's Dragoon Guards
- Major-General Wilkinson Dent CB CBE DSO, Commander 5th (Quetta) Infantry Brigade
- Lieutenant-General Thomas Desaguliers
- Lieutenant-General Frederick George Thomas Deshon
- General Sir Christopher Deverell
- Field Marshal Sir Cyril Deverell
- General Sir Jack Deverell
- Brigadier John Duncan Deverell MBE, Royal Irish Regiment
- Brigadier Michael Preston Douglas Dewar
- Major-General Richard Henry Dewing
- Brigadier Archibald Campbell Douglas Dick
- Brigadier Raphael Christopher Joseph Dick CBE (1935–2024), Royal Tank Regiment
- Major-General Sir Robert Henry Dick
- Major-General James Dick-Cunyngham
- Lieutenant-General Douglas Dickinson
- Major-General Thomas Dickinson
- Major-General Sir Alexander Dickson
- General Sir Collingwood Dickson
- Major-General Edward Thompson Dickson
- Major-General Sir Jeremiah Dickson
- Major-General William Dickson
- Major-General Patrick Dignan
- General Michael O'Brien Dilkes
- Field Marshal Sir John Dill
- Brigadier Sir (Charles) Michael Dillwyn-Venables-Llewelyn, Bt.
- Brigadier Harry Dimoline
- Major-General William Alfred Dimoline
- Lieutenant-General Alexander Dirom
- Brigadier Anthony Keith Dixon
- Major-General Matthew Charles Dixon
- Major-General Roy Laurence Cayley Dixon CB CVO MC
- Brigadier Cecil Thomas Dixon-Brown OBE (1894–1942)
- Brigadier Hilary Dixon-Nuttall
- Brigadier Ian Dobbie
- Lieutenant-General Sir William Dobbie
- Brigadier-General Herbert Thomas Dobbin
- Lieutenant-General Sir Charles Macpherson Dobell
- Major-General Anthony Henry George Dobson CB OBE MC (1911—c.1987), Royal Engineers
- Brigadier-General Colquhoun Scott Dodgson
- Brigadier Mark F. Dodson MBE, Highland RFCA Chief Executive (Rtd. October 2025)
- Major-General Alured Dodsworth
- General Sir George Don
- Major-General Colin Donald
- Brigadier-General Sir Hay Frederick Donaldson
- Lieutenant-General Sir Rufane Shaw Donkin
- Brigadier John Patrick Simon Donnelly
- General John Hely-Hutchinson, 2nd Earl of Donoughmore
- General Guy Carleton, 1st Baron Dorchester
- Major-General Eric Dorman-Smith
- Lieutenant-General Hon. Sir James Charlemagne Dormer
- Major-General Sir Arthur Dorward
- Lieutenant-General Archibald Douglas of Kirkton (1707–1778)
- Brigadier Archibald Sholto George Douglas CBE (1896–1981)
- General Sir Charles Douglas GCB ADC (1850–1914), Chief of the Imperial General Staff
- Major-General Henry Edward Manning Douglas
- Major-General Henry McDonell de Wend Douglas (1834–1897), Bengal Staff Corps
- General Sir Howard Douglas (1776–1861), lieutenant governor of New Brunswick
- Lieutenant-General Hon. James Douglas ( —1691), Scots Regiment of Footguards colonel
- General Sir James Douglas
- Major-General James Archibald Douglas CMG CIE (1862–1932)
- Lieutenant-General John Douglas, 14th (Bedfordshire) Regiment of Foot colonel (1787–1789)
- General Sir John Douglas (1817–1888)
- Major-General John Primrose Douglas QHS (1908–1975), Honorary Surgeon to the Queen
- Lieutenant-General Sir Kenneth Douglas, 1st Baronet (1754–1833)
- Lieutenant-General Sir Neil Douglas, (1779–1853), 79th (Highland) Regiment of Foot, in the 5th Anglo-German Division at the Battle of Waterloo
- Brigadier Patrick Sholto Douglas
- Major-General Robert Douglas (1727–1809), commander of 's-Hertogenbosch, a garrison city 1780–1794
- General Sir Robert Percy Douglas (1805–1891), 4th baronet of Carr
- Major-General Robert Douglas of Garlston, NB', (c. 1744–1798)
- Major-General Robert Douglas ( —1828, of the 55th Regiment of Foot, formerly Adjutant-General in the West Indies
- Brigadier-General Sir Thomas Monteath Douglas (1788–1868), East India Company
- Brigadier-General William Douglas of Kirkness (c. 1690–1747), 9th Queen's Royal Lancers, Coldstream Guards, 32nd (Cornwall) Regiment of Foot
- Major-General Sir William Douglas of Bonjedward and Timpendean KCH (1770–1834), 98th Regiment of Foot, 2nd Royal Veteran Battalions colonel
- General William Douglas, Royal Engineers
- Major-General Sir William Douglas, (1858–1920)
- Brigadier William Charles Douglas
- Major-General Octavius Douglas-Hamilton (1821–1904)
- Major-General John Keppel Ingold Douglas-Withers CBE MC
- Brigadier Mark Guy Douglas-Withers CBE ADC
- Lieutenant-General Sir John Doveton
- Lieutenant-General Sir Arthur Dowler
- Lieutenant-General Sir Ernest Down
- Major-General Hugh Dawnay, 8th Viscount Downe
- Major-General Major Downes
- General Ulysses Burgh, 2nd Baron Downes
- Major-General Sir Peter Downward
- General Sir Charles Hastings Doyle
- Major-General Sir Francis Hastings Doyle, 1st Baronet
- General Sir John Doyle, 1st Baronet
- Brigadier John Doyle
- Brigadier-General John Francis Innes Hay Doyle
- Lieutenant-General Francis D'Oyly
- Brigadier-General Alan Godfrey Drake-Brockman
- Brigadier Robin Draper
- Lieutenant-General Sir William Draper
- Brigadier Alec Wilson Drew
- Brigadier Cecil Francis Drew
- Brigadier James Robert Drew
- Major-General Sir James Syme Drew
- Lieutenant-General Sir Robert Drew
- Major-General John Drewienkiewicz
- Lieutenant-General Sir Christopher Drewry
- Field Marshal Charles Moore, 1st Marquess of Drogheda
- Lieutenant-General Berkeley Drummond
- General Sir Gordon Drummond
- Brigadier-General Sir Hugh Henry John Drummond, Bt.
- Lieutenant-General Sir Drury Curzon Drury-Lowe
- Lieutenant-General Sir William Drysdale KCB, 9th Queen's Royal Lancers colonel
- General Sir John Du Cane
- Major-General Frederick Dudgeon
- Brigadier-General Robert Maxwell Dudgeon
- Lieutenant-General Alan Colquhoun Duff CB OBE MCLegion of Merit (USA) Commander (1895–1973), Royal Engineers
- General Sir Alexander Duff
- Alexander Gordon Duff, GOC Infantry Brigade
- General Sir Beauchamp Duff, GCB GCSI GCVO
- General Sir James Duff
- Lieutenant-General Sir Peter Duffell
- Major-General Winston Dugan, 1st Baron Dugan of Victoria
- Major-General Sir Gerald Duke, Engineer-in-Chief
- Brigadier Derek Dunand
- Major-General Charles Dunbar
- Major-General Claude Dunbar
- Major-General Alastair Duncan
- Major-General Harvey Tuckett Duncan CSI (1826–1900), Indian Staff Corps
- Brigadier Hedley Dennis Cardew Duncan
- Brigadier Herbert Cecil Duncan
- Major-General Sir John Duncan
- General Sir David Dundas
- General Francis Dundas
- Major-General Sir James Fullerton Dundas, Bt.
- Lieutenant-General Sir Robert Dundas
- Major-General John Graham, 1st Viscount of Dundee
- Lieutenant-General Douglas Cochrane, 12th Earl of Dundonald
- Brigadier Bill Dunham
- Lieutenant-General James Dunlop of Dunlop
- General John Murray, 2nd Earl of Dunmore
- Major-General Josias Dunn (1837–1900), Royal Irish Fusiliers, Hon. Major-General
- Major-General Lionel Dunsterville
- Major-General Sir Henry Marion Durand
- Lieutenant-General James Durand
- Lieutenant-General Sir Benjamin d'Urban
- Major-General Elias Walker Durnford
- Brigadier Geoffrey Robert Durrant CBE (1932–2023), Director, Army Veterinary and Remount Services
- Major-General Bryan Dutton
- Lieutenant-General Sir James Dutton
- Brigadier Sidney Ernest Dutton
- Major-General Antony John Dyball
- Major-General Jack Dye
- Brigadier-General Reginald Dyer
- Brigadier Vivian Dykes

== E ==
- Major-General Frederick Marow Eardley-Wilmot
- Major-General Revell Eardley-Wilmot
- Major-General William Earle
- Brigadier-General Lionel William Pellew East
- Brigadier Alan Frank Eastburn
- Brigadier Gerald Arthur Eastwood
- Lieutenant-General Sir Ralph Eastwood
- Major-General Charles Eberhardie
- Brigadier Wilfred Algernon Ebsworth
- Brigadier Ronald Eccles
- Brigadier-General (temp. then hon.) Archibald James Fergusson Eden
- Brigadier-General (temp.) William Rushbrooke Eden CMG DSO
- General William Hassell Eden (1800–1882), 90th Regiment of Foot (Perthshire Volunteers)
- General William Edmeston ( —1804), 48th Regiment of Foot
- Brigadier-General Sir James Edward Edmonds
- Major-General Sir Herbert Benjamin Edwardes
- Lieutenant-General Sir James Bevan Edwards
- Brigadier John Edwards
- Major-General John Edwards
- Brigadier-General Richard Fielding Edwards
- Brigadier-General William FS Edwards
- Major-General Nick Eeles
- Brigadier-General Francis Howard, 1st Earl of Effingham
- Lieutenant-General Kenneth Howard, 1st Earl of Effingham
- Lieutenant-General Thomas Howard, 2nd Earl of Effingham
- Field Marshal Sir Charles Egerton
- Major-General Sir David Egerton
- Lieutenant-General Sir Raleigh Gilbert Egerton
- General Archibald Montgomerie, 11th Earl of Eglinton
- Major-General Roger Gillies Ekin
- Brigadier Mark Elcomb
- Brigadier Clive Richard Elderton
- Lieutenant-General Sir John Eldridge
- Lieutenant-General Thomas Bruce, 7th Earl of Elgin
- Lieutenant-General John Elkington
- Brigadier-General Robert James Goodall Elkington
- Brigadier-General Arthur Ellershaw
- Brigadier James Ellery
- Lieutenant-General Sir Edmond Elles
- Lieutenant-General Sir Hugh Elles
- Lieutenant-General Sir John Elley
- General Sir Charles Ellice
- Princess Elizabeth, honorary Senior Controller Women's Royal Army Corps (1949)
- Marshal (formerly Major-General) Sir Edward Ellington, Royal Air Force
- Major-General Sir Alexander Elliot
- Major-General Christopher Haslett Elliott
- Major-General Christopher Leslie Elliott
- Major-General Granville Elliott (1713–1759)
- Major-General Roger Elliott (1665–1714)
- General Sir William Henry Elliott
- Major-General Sir Arthur Ellis
- Brigadier Richard Stanley Ellis
- General Sir Samuel Burdon Ellis
- Brigadier Patrick John Ellwood
- Major-General Sir Howard Elphinstone, 1st Baronet
- Major-General Sir Howard Craufurd Elphinstone
- Major-General William George Keith Elphinstone
- Brigadier Frederick Algernon George Young Elton
- Lieutenant General Michael Elviss
- Brigadier James Bryce Emson CBE, Life Guards
- General Poole England
- General Sir Richard England
- Major-General Howard Ensor
- Major-General Roderick "Roger" Jarvis Ephraums CB OBE, Royal Marines
- Lieutenant-General Thomas Erle (1650–1720)
- Charles Hay, 20th Earl of Erroll
- General Sir George Erskine
- Major-General George Elphinstone Erskine
- Lieutenant-General Sir Henry Erskine, 5th Baronet
- Brigadier-General James Francis Erskine
- Lieutenant-General Sir William Erskine, 1st Baronet
- Major-General Sir William Erskine, 2nd Baronet
- Brigadier Douglas Erskine Crum
- Lieutenant-General Vernon Erskine-Crum
- General Sir Basil Eugster
- Brigadier-General Cuthbert Evans
- Brigadier David Mark Mortimer Evans OBE
- General Sir De Lacy Evans
- Lieutenant-General Sir Geoffrey Evans
- Major-General Henry Holland Evans (1914–1987)
- Major-General John Alan Maurice Evans
- Brigadier Lewis Pugh Evans
- Brigadier Michael Evans
- Brigadier Patrick Joseph Evans (1928— ), Royal Corps of Signals
- Brigadier Paul Evans OBE DL
- Major-General Robert Noel Evans, Royal Army Medical College
- Major-General Roger Evans
- Brigadier Samuel Piercy Evans
- Lieutenant-General Sir Thomas Evans
- Lieutenant-General Tim Evans
- Lieutenant-General William Evans
- Major-General William Andrew Evans CB, 5th Royal Inniskilling Dragoon Guards
- Brigadier William Harry Evans
- Lieutenant-General William Evelyn
- Brigadier Harry Frank Everard (1928–2022), Royal Engineers
- General Sir James Everard
- Lieutenant-General Sir John Fullerton Evetts
- Lieutenant-General Charles Brisbane Ewart
- General Sir John Alexander Ewart
- Major-General Sir Richard Henry Ewart
- Lieutenant-General Sir Spencer Ewart
- Major-General Sir Robert Ewbank
- Major-General Graham Anderson Ewer
- Major-General Kenneth Godfrey Exham
- Major General Sir James Eyre
- Major-General Sir Vincent Eyre

== F ==
- Major-General Sir Edward Arthur Fagan
- Major-General Patrick Feltrim Fagan CB MBE, Royal Engineers
- General Alexander Fair HM Indian Army
- Brigadier Claude Cyril Fairweather
- Brigadier Anthony John Faith
- Brigadier Eric Fenton Falkner
- Major-General Evelyn Boscawen, 7th Viscount Falmouth
- General Hugh Boscawen, 2nd Viscount Falmouth
- Brigadier-General St. John Fancourt Michell Fancourt
- General Sir Henry Fane
- Major-General Walter Fane
- General Edmund Fanning
- General Charles Fanshawe (c. 1817–1901), Colonel-Commandant Royal Engineers
- Lieutenant-General Sir Edward Fanshawe
- Lieutenant-General Edward Fanshawe CB (1785–1858), Royal Engineers
- Major-General Sir Evelyn Fanshawe
- Lieutenant-General Sir Hew Dalrymple Fanshawe
- Major-General Sir Robert Fanshawe
- General Sir Martin Farndale
- Major-General Andrew Farquhar
- Major-General William Farquhar
- Major-General Ralph Henry Farrant
- General Sir Anthony Farrar-Hockley
- Major-General Dair Farrar-Hockley
- Brigadier General Disney John Menzies Fasson
- Brigadier Ernest Frederick Faulkner
- Major-General Robert Nicholas Faunce, HM Indian Army, Commander of Burma Division
- Brigadier John Victor Faviell
- Brigadier Walter Lindley Fawcett MC ( —1945), 9th Gorkha Rifles
- General Sir William Fawcett
- Major-General Graham Ben Fawcus CB (1937–2024), Royal Engineers
- Lieutenant-General Sir Harold Fawcus (1876–1947)
- Major General Angus Stuart James Fay
- Major-General Edward Feetham, 39th Division
- Lieutenant-General Joseph Feilden
- Major-General Sir Randle Feilden
- Major-General Sir Geoffrey Feilding
- General Sir Percy Feilding
- General The Honourable William Feilding
- Brigadier Reginald William Lyon Fellowes
- Major-General Stewart Fellows (1832–1903), 8th Bombay Native Infantry
- Lieutenant-General Richard Felton
- Brigadier-General Algernon Francis Holford Ferguson
- General Sir Ronald Craufurd Ferguson
- General Sir Henry Ferguson Davie, 1st Baronet
- General Sir Charles Fergusson, 7th Baronet
- General Sir James Fergusson
- Major-General Edward Robert Festing (1831–1912)
- Major-General Sir Francis Worgan Festing (1833–1886)
- Brigadier-General Francis Leycester Festing (1877–1947)
- Field Marshal Sir Francis Wogan Festing (1902–1976)
- Brigadier Anne Field
- Major-General Geoffrey William Field
- Lieutenant-General Andrew Figgures
- Brigadier Mark St John Filler CBE, Adjutant General's Corps, Educational and Training Services Branch
- General the Hon Edward Finch (1756–1843)
- Major-General Lionel Finch
- Brigadier-General Neil Douglas Findlay, Royal Artillery, (1859–1914) killed at the First Battle of the Aisne
- Major-General Cecil Firbank
- Major-General Charles Firth
- Major-General Arthur Fisher
- Lieutenant-General Sir Bertie Fisher
- Brigadier Sir Gerald Thomas Fisher (1887–1965)
- Brigadier Richard Harry Fisher
- Major-General Lord Michael Fitzalan-Howard
- Brigadier-General Charles FitzClarence
- Lieutenant-General Lord Frederick FitzClarence
- General Sir Victor FitzGeorge-Balfour
- Brigadier Denis Fitzgerald
- Field Marshal Sir John FitzGerald
- Major-General Mordaunt Martin FitzGerald (c. 1832–1902), Royal Artillery
- Major-General Edward Fitzherbert
- General Sir James Fitzmayer
- General Sir Desmond Fitzpatrick
- General the Honourable Richard FitzPatrick
- General Lord Charles FitzRoy
- General the Honourable Charles FitzRoy
- Major-General William FitzRoy (1830–1902)
- Lieutenant-General Sir Frederick Fitzwygram, 4th Baronet
- Brigadier Bryan Fleming
- Brigadier Bolton Neil Littledale Fletcher
- Brigadier Edward Michael Flint Signal Officer-in-Chief (Army)
- Brigadier Bob Flood
- Brigadier Basil Edward Floyd
- Major-General Sir Henry Floyd, 2nd Baronet
- Brigadier Sir Henry Floyd, 5th Baronet
- General Sir John Floyd, 1st Baronet
- Lieutenant-General Arthur Floyer-Acland
- Brigadier Stafford Floyer-Acland
- Lieutenant-General Sir John Foley
- Brigadier-General Gilbert Burrell Spencer Follett
- Lieutenant-General John Folliot
- Brigadier Richard Mildmay Foot
- Major-General Henry Robert Bowreman Foote
- Lieutenant-General Edward Foord
- Major-General David Forbes
- General James Forbes, 17th Lord Forbes
- Brigadier-General John Forbes
- General Sir Ronald Forbes Adam, 2nd Baronet
- Major-General Ludwig Karl Ford CB CBE
- General Sir Robert Ford
- Brigadier William Marshall Fordham
- General Sir John Fordyce
- General Sir Edward Forestier-Walker
- General Sir Frederick Forestier-Walker
- Major-General Sir George Forestier-Walker
- General William Charles Forrest CB (1819–1902)
- Major-General Michael Forrester
- Major-General John Forster
- Brigadier Stewart Arthur Forster
- Brigadier Edward Oliver Forster-Knight
- Brigadier-General The Honourable Charles Granville Fortescue
- Brigadier Edward Norman Fortescue Hitchins
- Major-General Sir Victor Fortune
- General Sir Charles John Foster
- Brigadier Sir John Foster
- Major-General John Hulbert Foster
- General Sir Richard Foster, Royal Marines
- Brigadier Thomas Francis Vere Foster
- Major-General Sir David Foulis
- Major-General Charles Foulkes
- Major-General Thomas Foulkes
- Lieutenant-General Sir George Henry Fowke
- Major-General Charles Christopher Fowkes
- Brigadier Arthur Laurence Fowler MC
- Major-General Francis John Fowler
- Brigadier Harold Gordon Fowler
- Brigadier Ian Bruce Robert Fowler
- Lieutenant-General Sir John Fowler
- General Charles Richard Fox
- General Henry Edward Fox
- Major-General Peter Fox
- Major-General William Fox-Pitt
- Major-General Edwin Frederick Foxton CB OBE, Royal Army Educational Corps
- Brigadier Peter David Foxton CBE, Royal Logistics Corps
- Brigadier-General Sidney Goodall Francis
- General Sir Harold Franklyn
- Lieutenant-General Sir William Franklyn KCB
- Major-General Robert Roche Franks (1829–1888), Bengal Artillery
- Major-General Sir Thomas Harte Franks KCB
- General Alexander Fraser CB (1824–1898), Bengal Engineer Group
- Major-General Alexander Robert Fraser (1820–1900), 3rd Madras Light Cavalry
- General Sir David Fraser GCB OBE
- Major-General Simon Fraser of Ford and Overton House (1809–1895), Royal Marines
- Major-General Sir Theodore Fraser
- Brigadier the Hon. William Fraser
- Major-General William Archibald Kenneth Fraser
- General Sir James Fraser-Tytler
- General Edward Frederick
- Major-General Marescoe Frederick
- Major-General Julian Free
- Lieutenant-General Sir Ian Freeland
- Brigadier Roger Harvey Freeman
- Major-General Adrian Freer
- Major-General Ian Freer
- General Sir Arthur Lyon Fremantle
- Brigadier Charles Newenham French
- Field Marshal John French, 1st Earl of Ypres
- Lieutenant-General Bernard Freyberg, 1st Baron Freyberg
- Major-General John Friedberger
- Major-General Arthur Leslie Irvine Friend
- Brigadier Myles Richard Frisby
- Brigadier Sir Eric Herbert Cokayne Frith
- Major-General Osmund Townley Frith
- Brigadier Charles William Frizell DSO MC, Royal Berkshire Regiment
- Major-General John Frost
- Lieutenant-General Sir Robert Fry
- Major-General Michael Teape Fugard
- Major-General Cuthbert Fuller
- Brigadier Bernard Victor Hilary Fullerton CBE, Royal Army Pay Corps
- Lieutenant-General Sir Robert Fulton
- Major-General (Francis William) Edward Fursdon CB MBE (1925–2007), Royal Engineers
- Lieutenant-General Sir William Furse
- Brigadier Alastair Fyfe
- Lieutenant-General Sir Richard Fyffe
- Major-General Arthur Roderic Fyler
- Lieutenant-General Albert Fytche

== G ==
- Brigadier Kenneth Joseph Gabbett
- Major-General Henry Gage, 3rd Viscount Gage
- Brigadier Richard Francis O'Donnell Gage
- General Thomas Gage
- Lieutenant-General Sir Charles Gairdner
- Lieutenant-General Henry Richmond Gale
- General Sir Richard Gale
- Lieutenant-General Sir Alexander Galloway
- Major-General Sir Archibald Galloway
- Major-General Kenneth Gardiner Galloway
- Henri de Massue, Earl of Galway
- Brigadier W. C. V. Galwey
- Major-General Michael Gambier-Parry
- Major-General Dominic Jacotin Gamble
- Lieutenant-General Sir James Gammell
- Major-General John Anthony Gamon CBE QHDS, Royal Army Dental Corps
- Lieutenant-General Sir John Gardiner
- General Sir Robert Gardiner
- Brigadier Michael Arthur Gardner
- Brigadier Hugh Cairns, Viscount Garmoyle
- Brigadier-General Sir Francis Sudlow Garratt
- Brigadier Christopher John Garrett
- Major-General Henry Edmund Melvill Lennox Garrett
- Lieutenant-General Sir Martin Garrod
- General George Garth
- General Thomas Garth
- Brigadier Clive Garthwaite
- Brigadier Conrad Thomas Garton
- General Sir John Garvock
- Brigadier-General Sir Ernest Frederick Orby Gascoigne
- Major-General Sir Julian Gascoigne
- Major-General Sir William Julius Gascoigne
- Lieutenant-General Isaac Gascoyne
- General Sir Alfred Gaselee
- Major-General Herbert Stuart Gaskell
- Lieutenant-General Sir William Forbes Gatacre
- Major-General Alexander Gatehouse
- Brigadier-General Sir George Gater
- General the Honourable Sir Francis Gathorne-Hardy
- Major-General Mark Jarvis Gaunt CB
- Major-General James Merricks Lewis Gavin
- Major-General Sir Arthur William Gay
- Major-General Sir Eric Geddes
- Brigadier-General John Gordon Geddes
- Major-General William Gent, Dutch East India Company
- Major-General Richard Eustace John Gerrard-Wright CB CBE (1930–2012), 39th Infantry Brigade
- Major General Sir Chris Ghika
- Brigadier Prince John Ghika (1928–2003), Irish Guards
- Brigadier-General Sir Alexander Gibb
- Brigadier Ian Jonathan Gibb
- General Sir John Gibbon
- Lieutenant-General Sir Edward Gibbs
- Field Marshal Sir Roland Gibbs
- Brigadier Paul Gibson
- General John Charles Hope Gibsone
- General Sir George Giffard
- Major-General Glyn Gilbert
- General Sir Walter Gilbert, 1st Baronet
- Major-General Peter Gilchrist
- Major-General Ian Gill
- Major-General John Galbraith Gill
- Brigadier-General Reynold Alexander Gillam
- Brigadier-General Ernest Carden Freeth Gillespie
- Major-General Sir Peter Gillett
- Brigadier Albert Gillibrand (1884–1942)
- General Sir Webb Gillman
- Brigadier George Henry Gilmore, 203rd Infantry Brigade
- Brigadier-General Sir Robert Gilmour, 1st Baronet
- Major-General Laurie William Albert Gingell OBE, Royal Tank Regiment, Royal Armoured Corps
- Brigadier Charles Richard Patrick Ginn, Head of Plans, Army Command
- General Sir Reginald Gipps
- Major-General Sir Eric Girdwood
- Major-General Peter Howard Girling OBE (1915–1991), Royal Electrical and Mechanical Engineers
- Major-General Henry Gladwin
- Brigadier-General Duncan John Glasfurd
- Major-General Paul Gleadell
- Major-General Lord Edward Gleichen
- Brigadier Edward Aubrey Glennie DSO CIE (1889–1980), Royal Engineers, Survey of India Director
- Lieutenant-General James Murray, 1st Baron Glenlyon
- Field Marshal Prince William Henry, Duke of Gloucester and Edinburgh
- Major-General Sir Guy de Courcy Glover
- General Sir James Glover
- Major-General Peter Glover
- Major-General Sir Frederic Manley Glubb
- Lieutenant-General Sir John Bagot Glubb
- Lieutenant-General Sir John Plumptre Carr Glyn
- Brigadier Kevin John Watson Goad CBE ADC, ( —2023), Commandant, Central Ordnance Depot, Bicester
- Brigadier-General Phillip Goddard
- Brigadier-General Charles Edward Godby
- Major-General Joseph Godby ( —1902), Royal Artillery
- Brigadier Bryan Trevor Godfrey-Faussett (1896–1970), Commandant of the School of Military Engineering
- General Sir Alexander Godley
- Lieutenant-General Sir Charles Godwin
- General Sir Reade Godwin-Austen
- General Sir George Leigh Goldie
- Lieutenant-General Thomas Goldie of Goldielea
- Brigadier Mark Redman Goldsack
- Major-General Sir Frederic John Goldsmid
- Lieutenant-General Philip Goldsworthy
- Major-General Walter Tuckfield Goldsworthy
- Field Marshal Sir William Maynard Gomm
- Brigadier Sir Arthur Gooch, 14th Baronet
- Major-General Sir William Gooch, 1st Baronet
- General Sir Richard Goodbody
- Brigadier Ernest Reginald Goode
- Lieutenant-General Sir William Howley Goodenough
- Lieutenant-General Charles Augustus Goodfellow
- Lieutenant-General Gerald Goodlake
- Major-General John David Whitlock Goodman
- Lieutenant-General Sir John Goodwin
- Lieutenant-General Sir Richard Elton Goodwin
- General Lord Adam Gordon
- Brigadier Alan Fleetwood Gordon CBE, Royal Artillery, 1st Artillery Brigade
- Brigadier-General Alister Fraser Gordon
- Brigadier Barbara Masson Gordon
- Major-General Charles George Gordon
- Major-General Desmond Gordon
- Major-General the Honourable Sir Frederick Gordon
- General George Gordon, 5th Duke of Gordon
- Major-General James Gordon
- General Sir James Willoughby Gordon, 1st Baronet
- Major-General Joseph Maria Gordon
- Major-General Robert Gordon
- Major-General Thomas Gordon
- General William Gordon
- General Sir Robert Gordon-Finlayson
- Major-General Bernard Gordon Lennox
- Brigadier-General Lord Esme Gordon-Lennox
- Lieutenant-General Sir George Gordon-Lennox
- Brigadier Adrian Clements Gore
- General Sir Charles Stephen Gore
- Brigadier Francis Norton Wentworth Gore
- Brigadier General Robert Clements Gore
- Brigadier-General Michael Derwas Goring-Jones
- Lieutenant-General Sir George Gorringe
- Field Marshal John Vereker, 6th Viscount Gort
- Major-General Arthur Goschen
- Brigadier Geoffrey William Goschen
- Brigadier-General Charles Gosling
- Lieutenant-General William Gott
- Brigadier Christopher Hugh Gotto DSO MC (1888–1959), Commanding Officer South Lincolnshire Sub-Area
- General Sir Charles John Stanley Gough
- General Sir Hubert Gough
- Field Marshal Hugh Gough, 1st Viscount Gough
- General Sir Hugh Henry Gough
- Brigadier-General Sir John Gough VC
- Brigadier William Hugh George Gough
- Major-General John Charles Gould
- General Sir Ian Gourlay
- Brigadier John Wesley Harper Gow (1898–1986),
- General Sir Michael Gow
- Brigadier-General Alexander Hore-Ruthven, 1st Earl of Gowrie
- General Sir Douglas Gracey
- Major-General David Graeme
- Lieutenant-General Sir Andrew Graham, 5th Baronet
- Major-General Douglas Graham
- Brigadier Lord Douglas Malise Graham (1883–1974), Assistant Director of the Royal Artillery
- Major-General Sir Edward Graham
- Major-General Frederick Graham
- Lieutenant-General Sir Gerald Graham
- Major-General John Graham
- Brigadier John Ainsley Graham
- Lieutenant-General Sir Peter Graham (1937–2024), GOC Scottish Command
- Brigadier-General William Graham
- Lieutenant-General John Manners, Marquess of Granby
- Major-General Lawrence Douglas Grand
- General Sir Charles Grant
- Lieutenant-General Sir Colquhoun Grant
- Major-General Ferris Nelson Grant
- Lieutenant-General Francis Grant
- General Sir Henry Grant
- General Sir Hope Grant
- Major-General James Grant
- Major-General James Grant (Waterloo)
- Field Marshal Sir Patrick Grant
- Major-General Sir Philip Gordon Grant
- Lieutenant-General Sir Scott Grant
- Major-General Peter Grant Peterkin
- General Sir Timothy Granville-Chapman
- Lieutenant-General Sir Arthur Edward Grasett
- Lieutenant-General Sir George Gray, 3rd Baronet
- Brigadier John Wheatley Gray
- Lieutenant-General Sir Michael Gray
- General Sir Edward Greathed
- Major-General William Greathed
- General Sir George Richard Greaves
- Brigadier-General Lionel 'Norman' Green OBE. Royal Ordnance Corp. 1933–2009
- Brigadier-General Arthur Frank Umfreville Green
- Brigadier Duncan Green
- General Sir Edward Green (1810-1891)
- Brigadier-General Henry Green
- Brigadier Michael Green
- Brigadier-General Wilfrith Green
- General Sir William Green, 1st Baronet
- Major-General William Green (1882–1947)
- Major-General Sir William Henry Rodes Green
- Lieutenant-General Sir William Wyndham Green (1887–1979)
- Major-General Walter Howorth 'Bob' Greenly
- Brigadier John Bernard Kelynge Greenway
- Major-General Sir Leonard Greenwell
- Brigadier-General Lewis Frederic Green-Wilkinson (1865–1950), Rifle Brigade (The Prince Consort's Own)
- Brigadier-General Frederick Augustus Greer
- Major-General Sir Stuart Greeves
- Lieutenant-General Sir Andrew Gregory
- Major-General Guy Gregson
- Major-General Philip Gregson-Ellis
- Field Marshal Francis Grenfell, 1st Baron Grenfell
- Major-General Sir Charles John Greville
- General the Honourable Charles Grey
- General Charles Grey, 1st Earl Grey
- Brigadier Charles Ridley Grey
- Lieutenant-General Sir John Grey
- Major-General John St John Grey (1934–2024)
- Lieutenant-General Sir James Grierson
- General Sir Watkin Lewis Griffies-Williams, 3rd Baronet
- Brigadier John Griffin
- Lieutenant-General Charles Griffiths
- Brigadier Mike Griffiths
- Major-General Harry Grimshaw
- Brigadier Christopher Beckett, 4th Baron Grimthorpe
- Major-General Robin Digby Grist CB OBE, Gloucestershire Regiment Colonel (1991–1994)
- Brigadier-General George Grogan
- Brigadier James Cyril Groom
- Major-General John Patrick Groom
- Lieutenant-General Francis Grose
- Field Marshal Thomas Grosvenor
- Major-General Sir Coleridge Grove
- Brigadier-General Edward Grove
- Lieutenant-General Sir Maurice Grove-White
- Brigadier-General Percy Groves
- Major-General Sir Colin Gubbins
- Brigadier-General Sir Gordon Guggisberg
- Lieutenant-General John Christopher Guise, VC CB,
- General Sir John Wright Guise
- Major-General Sir Samuel Guise-Moores
- Brigadier Adam Brampton Douglas Gurdon
- Major-General Temple Gurdon
- Brigadier Cecil Hay Gurney
- Major-General Russell Gurney
- Field Marshal Charles Guthrie, Baron Guthrie of Craigiebank
- Lieutenant-General Sir Philip Guy
- General Sir Roland Guy
- Lieutenant-General Sir Willoughby Gwatkin
- Brigadier Llewellyn Gwydyr-Jones
- Major-General Sir Charles Gwynn
- Major-General Llewellyn Henry Gwynne

== H ==
- General Sir John Hackett (1910–1997)
- Brigadier Reginald Wilfred Hackett
- Major-General Sir Charles Hadden (1854–1924)
- Major-General Frederick Edward Hadow (1836–1915)
- General Sir Brodie Haig (1886–1957)
- Field Marshal Douglas Haig, 1st Earl Haig (1861–1928)
- Brigadier-General Roland Haig (1873–1953)
- Field Marshal Sir Frederick Haines (1819–1909)
- General Sir Robert Haining KCB DSO (1882–1959)
- Major-General Sir Edmund Hakewill-Smith KCVO CB CBE MC (1896–1986)
- General Sir Richard Haking GBE KCB KCMG (1862–1945)
- General Sir Aylmer Haldane GCMG KCB DSO (1862–1950)
- Lieutenant-General Sir Frederick Haldimand KB (1718–1791)
- General John Hale
- General Sir Colin Halkett
- General Baron Hugh Halkett
- Major-General Douglas Keith Elphinstone Hall DSO, Dorsetshire Regiment
- Major-General Edward Michael Hall (1915–1993)
- General Gage John Hall
- Brigadier-General John Hamilton Hall
- Major-General Jonathan Hall
- Lieutenant-General Julian Hall
- Major-General Kenneth Hall CB OBE, Royal Army Educational Corps
- Brigadier Edward Halliman Commander 15th A.A. Brigade, Gibraltar
- Major-General John Gregson Halsted (1890–1980), Aldershot Command Assistant QMG
- Major-General Sir Richard Hebden O'Grady Haly
- General Sir William O'Grady Haly KCB (1811–1878)
- Major-General Sir Percy Hambro
- General Sir Bruce Hamilton GCB KCVO (1857–1936), 2nd Infantry Division, Scottish Command
- Brigadier Bruce Meade Hamilton
- Major-General Sir Edward Hamilton
- General Sir Frederick William Hamilton
- Major-General Geoffrey "Goff" Hamilton
- Major-General Hubert Hamilton CB CVO DSO (1861–1914), 7th Infantry Brigade and Headquarters East, 46th (North Midland) Division, 3rd Division
- General Sir Ian Hamilton GCB GCMG DSO TD (1853–1947), Mediterranean Expeditionary Force, Southern Command, 3rd Infantry Brigade 1st Gordon Highlanders
- Lieutenant-General James Hamilton, 4th Duke of Hamilton
- General James Inglis Hamilton (1728–1803), 113th Regiment of Foot, 15th Regiment of Foot
- Lieutenant-General Sir John Hamilton, 1st Baronet, of Woodbrook (1755–1835), East India Company
- Brigadier-General Percy Douglas Hamilton
- Lieutenant-General Sir Robert Hamilton, 4th Baronet
- Brigadier Jock Hamilton-Baillie
- Major-General Sir John Hamilton-Dalrymple, 5th Baronet
- General the Honourable Sir Alexander Hamilton-Gordon KCB (1817–1890), Eastern District
- Lieutenant-General Sir Alexander Hamilton-Gordon KCB (1859–1939), IX Corps Commander, Aldershot Command GOC
- Major-General John Hamilton-Jones
- Brigadier the Honourable Richard Gustavus Hamilton-Russell
- Lieutenant-General Sir Edward Bruce Hamley
- Brigadier Christopher Hammerbeck
- Major-General Frederick Hammersley (British Army officer, born 1824)
- Major-General Frederick Hammersley (British Army officer, born 1858)
- Brigadier-General Thomas Brand, 3rd Viscount Hampden
- Brigadier Richard Nigel Hanbury
- Major-General Sir John Hanbury-Williams
- Major-General Michael Stephen Hancock (1917–2006)
- Brigadier John Michael Hanmer
- Field Marshal Ernest Augustus, King of Hanover
- Brigadier Michael Harbottle
- Field Marshal William Harcourt, 3rd Earl Harcourt
- Brigadier Donald Hardie
- Major-General Francis Pym Harding
- Brigadier Geoffrey Parker Harding
- Lieutenant-General Sir George Harding
- Field Marshal John Harding, 1st Baron Harding of Petherton
- Major-General Reginald Harding
- Brigadier-General Edward Harding-Newman
- Major-General John Cartwright Harding-Newman CB CMG, Essex Regiment Colonel
- Brigadier Rupert Norton Harding-Newman (1907–2007), 5th Royal Tank Regiment, 6th Royal Tank Regiment, 2nd Royal Tank Regiment, Royal Tank Corps
- General Sir Arthur Edward Hardinge
- Field Marshal Henry Hardinge, 1st Viscount Hardinge
- General Sir Campbell Hardy
- Major-General John Hardy
- Brigadier Sir Geoffrey Hardy-Roberts
- Major-General James Francis Hare
- Brigadier-General Robert William Hare
- Brigadier Patrick Frank Blair Hargrave
- Lieutenant-General William Hargrave
- Brigadier Kenneth Hargreaves
- Major-General William Herbert Hargreaves
- Brigadier Sir Louis Hargroves
- General Sir Charles Harington Harington
- General Sir Charles Henry Pepys Harington
- Major-General John Harington, O.B.E.
- Brigadier Anthony Duncan Harking, O.B.E.
- Major-General John Granville Harkness (1831–1900)
- General Sir Alexander Harley
- Lieutenant-General Sir George Harman
- General Sir Jack Harman
- Lieutenant-General Sir Wentworth Harman
- Lieutenant-General Sir George Harper
- J. J. Harper
- General Charles Stanhope, 3rd Earl of Harrington
- General William Stanhope, 2nd Earl of Harrington
- Lieutenant-General George Harris, 1st Baron Harris
- Lieutenant-General Sir Ian Harris
- Lieutenant-General William Harris, 2nd Baron Harris
- Major-General Desmond Harrison
- Major-General Eric George William Warde Harrison CB CBE MC
- Brigadier Ernest James Cholmeley Harrison
- Brigadier Iain Graham Harrison
- Major-General Ian Harrison
- Major-General James Harrison
- General Sir Richard Harrison
- Brigadier Colin John McCrae Harrisson
- Brigadier-General Geoffrey Harnett Harrisson
- Major-General Lionel Alexander Digby Harrod
- Major-General Arthur Fitzroy Hart, 5th Infantry Brigade
- Lieutenant-General Henry George Hart
- General Sir Reginald Hart
- Major-General Trevor Stuart Hart
- Brigadier Trevor Hart Dyke
- Major-General William Claverin Hartgill
- Lieutenant-General Thomas Mahon, 2nd Baron Hartland
- General Sir Alan Hartley
- Brigadier-General Arthur Henry Seton Hart-Synnot
- Major-General John Redmond Hartwell
- C.B.C. "Roscoe" Harvey (1900–1996)
- Major-General Sir Charles Harvey (1888–1969), Military Adviser in Chief, Indian States Forces
- Major-General David Harvey
- Lieutenant-General Edward Harvey
- Lieutenant-General Sir John Harvey
- General Sir Robert John Harvey CB FRS (1785–1860), Chief-of-Staff of the Portuguese Army 1811-14
- Major-General Robert Napier Harvey
- General Sir Charles Hastings, 1st Baronet
- General Francis Rawdon-Hastings, 1st Marquess of Hastings
- Major-General George Seton Hatton
- Lieutenant-General Sir Henry Havelock-Allan, 1st Baronet
- Major-General Sir Henry Havelock
- Lieutenant-General Sir John Hawkesworth
- Brigadier Victor Francis Staples Hawkins
- Major-General Alan Hawley
- Lieutenant-General Henry Hawley
- Major-General Andrew Hay
- Lieutenant-General Charles Craufurd Hay
- Lieutenant-General Lord James Hay
- Brigadier-General Lord John Hay
- Major-General John Charles Hay (c. 1830–1902), Madras Staff Corps
- Major-General Mian Hayaud Din
- Lieutenant-General Sir Robert Hayman-Joyce
- Brigadier Ross John Finnis Hayter CB CMG DSO, Cheshire Regiment
- General Sir Edmund Haythorne
- Brigadier-General Percy Hazelton
- Brigadier Antony Head, 1st Viscount Head
- Brigadier-General Hugh Roger Headlam
- Brigadier Sheila Heaney
- Major-General John Coussamker Heath
- Major-General Sir Charles Heath
- Lieutenant-General Sir Lewis Heath
- Major-General Michael Stuart Heath
- Major-General Frederick Heath-Caldwell
- Brigadier Roderick Heathcoat-Amory MC
- Brigadier-General Charles Edensor Heathcote
- Brigadier Sir Gilbert Heathcote, Bt.
- Brigadier-General the Honourable Charles Strathavon Heathcote-Drummond-Willoughby (1870–1949)
- General Francis Augustus Eliott, 2nd Baron Heathfield
- General George Augustus Eliott, 1st Baron Heathfield (1717–1790)
- Brigadier Algernon George William Heber-Percy
- Brigadier Killingworth Michael Fentham Hedges CBE DSO, Royal Army Service Corps
- Brigadier Brian David Heelis
- Brigadier Philip Charles Skene Heidenstam
- Major-General Eric James Hellier (1927–2011)
- General Sir Peter Hellings
- Major-General Frederick Wilson Hemming
- Brigadier John Hemsley
- Brigadier-General William George Hemsley-Thompson
- Brigadier-General Sir Brodie Henderson
- Lieutenant-General Sir David Henderson
- Brigadier Dame Joan Henderson
- Major-General John Henderson
- Major-General Kennett Gregg Henderson CB (1836–1902)
- Brigadier-General Patrick William Hendry
- General Sir William Heneker
- Brigadier-General the Honourable Anthony Morton Henley
- Brigadier Francis Robert Henn CBE (1920–2020), chief of staff of the UN Force in Cyprus
- Brigadier Mary Brigid Teresa Hennessy CBE RRC QHNS, Queen Alexandra's Royal Army Nursing Corps
- Lieutenant-General the Honourable Sir Brydges Henniker
- Major-General the Honourable Arthur Henniker-Major
- Brigadier Clinton Lionel Guy Grant Henshaw CBE (1936–2025), Royal Green Jackets
- Brigadier Richard Frank Bradshaw Hensman
- General Sir Arthur James Herbert
- Brigadier Charles Edward Mercer Herbert (1904–1981)
- Lieutenant-General Sir Otway Herbert
- Lieutenant-General Sir Percy Egerton Herbert
- Major-General William Herbert (c. 1696–1757), 6th Regiment of Marines, 14th Regiment of Foot 2nd Dragoon Guards (Queen's Bays)
- General William Norman Herbert CB CMG DSO DL (1880–1949), Royal Northumberland Fusiliers, 23rd (Northumbrian) Division
- Major-General Francis John Hercy (1835–1902)
- Major-General Sir James Heriot-Maitland, KCB (1837–1902), Royal Engineers
- Brigadier-General James Dalgleish Heriot-Maitland
- Lieutenant-General Sir John Heron-Maxwell, 4th Baronet
- General William Hervey
- General Sir Reginald Hewetson
- Major-General Edward Osborne Hewett
- General Sir George Hewett, 1st Baronet
- Brigadier William George Hewett
- Brigadier Carl Arthur Hewitt MBE (1954— )
- Brigadier Arthur George Hewson
- Major-General George Douglas Gordon Dufferin Heyman
- Major-General Cecil Heywood
- Brigadier Frederick James Heyworth
- Major-General Sir William Hickie
- Brigadier Henry John Hickman (1936— )
- Major-General Michael Hicks
- Brigadier Denis Ronald Higginbotham CBE, Royal Pioneer Corps
- General Sir George Higginson
- General Sir Henry Hildyard
- Major-General Sir Basil Alexander Hill
- Major-General Eustace George Hill
- Lieutenant-General Giles Hill
- Brigadier James Hill
- Major-General John Hill
- Major-General Sir John Hill KCB (1834–1902), Royal Bombay Engineers
- General Rowland Hill, 1st Viscount Hill
- Major-General Walter Pitts Hendy Hill CB CMG DSO (1877–1942), Royal Fusiliers
- Brigadier John Bartlett Hillary
- Lieutenant-General Sir James Hills-Johnes
- Major-General Richard Hilton
- Major-General Frederick Hime (1836–1902), Royal Engineers
- Major-General Sir Robert Hinde
- Lieutenant-General Sir Thomas Hislop, 1st Baronet
- Lieutenant-General Sir Basil Hitchcock
- Major-General Patrick Robert Chamier Hobart (1917–1986)
- Major-General Sir Percy Hobart KBE CB DSO MC (1885–1957) Director of Military Training, GOC 79th Armoured Division, 11th Armoured Division, Mobile Division (Egypt)
- Major-General Sir Michael Hobbs
- Major-General Reginald Hobbs
- Lieutenant General Sir James Hockenhull
- Brigadier David Hendry Hodge OBE DL, Territorial, Auxiliary and Volunteer Reserve Association
- General Sir Edward Hodge
- Major-General Gordon West Hodgen (1894–1968), Southern Command, Army Headquarters India
- Major-General Robert John Hodges (1936–2024), Colonel The King's Own Royal Border Regiment.
- Major-General Timothy Hodgetts
- Major-General Sir Henry West Hodgson KCMG CB CVO (1868–1930), 14th and 15th The King's Hussars
- General John Hodgson
- Field Marshal Studholme Hodgson (1708–1798)
- Brigadier-General Rudolph Trower Hogg
- Major-General Arthur Michael Lancelot Hogge
- Major-General Daniel Hoghton
- Major-General John Holden
- General Sir Edward Alan Holdich
- Lieutenant-General Sir Arthur Holland
- Brigadier-General Percy Holland
- Major-General Sir Pomeroy Holland-Pryor
- Major-General Spencer Edmund Hollond
- Lieutenant-General Sir Herbert Holman
- Brigadier John Holman CBE DL (1938–2011)
- Major-General Michael Holme
- Lieutenant-General Henry Holmes
- Major General John Holmes
- Major-General Matthew Holmes
- Major-General Sir Noel Holmes
- Brigadier Richard Holmes
- Lieutenant-General Sir William Holmes
- Brigadier Rubert Edward Holmes a Court
- Brigadier John Graham Holmes-Smith
- Brigadier Arthur Eric Holt
- Brigadier Christopher Gibbs Holtom
- Major-General Arthur Holworthy
- Major-General John Vincent Homan
- Brigadier-General Sir Archibald Fraser Home (1874–1953).
- Brigadier Francis Wyville Home
- Maj.-Gen. Hon. William Sholto Home (1842–1916) Grenadier Guards
- Major-General Sir Ralph Hone
- General Sir Philip Honywood
- Lieutenant-General Sir Alexander Hood
- Major-General Ernest Lionel Ouseley Hood
- Major-General St. John Cutler Hooley
- Lieutenant General Ivan Hooper
- Brigadier John Hedley Hooper
- Brigadier Maxwell Richard Julian Hope-Thomson, aka Tim Hope-Thomson, DSO OBE MC (1911–1990)
- General Sir Alexander Hope GCB (1769–1837)
- General Sir James Archibald Hope
- Lieutenant-General Sir John Hope
- General Sir William Hope, 14th Baronet
- General John Hope, 4th Earl of Hopetoun
- Brigadier Basil Hildebrand Hopkins
- Major-General George F. Hopkinson
- Major-General John Charles Oswald Rooke Hopkinson CB (1931–2016), Queen's Own Highlanders (Seaforth and Camerons)
- Major-General Peregrine Hopson
- Lieutenant-General Sir Edward Hopton
- Brigadier Francis Charles Hopton Scott (1903–1975)
- Brigadier Alfred Henry Hopwood GCB GCMG GCVO (1882–1956), Royal Lincolnshire Regiment 2nd Battalion CO, Tientsin Area CO, North Midland Area CO
- Brigadier-General Gwyn Venables Hordern
- General Sir Frederick Horn
- Brigadier-General Montagu Leyland Hornby DSO, British Indian Army
- General Henry Horne, 1st Baron Horne
- Brigadier-General Mathew Horne
- Lieutenant-General Sir Brian Horrocks
- Major-General David Ralph Horsfield
- Major-General Derek Horsford
- General Sir John Josiah Hort, 3rd Baronet
- Brigadier-General Sir William Horwood
- Major-General Sir Reginald Hoskins
- Major-General Dixon Edward Hoste
- General Beaumont Hotham, 3rd Baron Hotham
- Brigadier-General Sir Charles Hotham, 4th Baronet
- Brigadier F W Houghton DSO MC, Royal Engineers, Bombay Miners and Sappers
- Field Marshal Lord Houghton of Richmond
- Major-General Robert Houghton
- Lieutenant-General Sir David House
- Major-General David Houston
- General Sir William Houston, 1st Baronet
- General Sir Charles Howard
- Brigadier Sir Charles Howard
- Major-General Sir Francis Howard
- Field Marshal Sir George Howard
- Brigadier James Bernard Howard
- Lieutenant-General Thomas Howard
- Field Marshal John Griffin, 4th Baron Howard de Walden
- General Sir Patrick Howard-Dobson
- Lieutenant-General Sir Edward Howard-Vyse
- Major-General Sir Richard Howard-Vyse
- General John Cradock, 1st Baron Howden
- Lieutenant-General Emanuel Howe
- Brigadier-General George Howe, 3rd Viscount Howe
- General Richard Curzon-Howe, 3rd Earl Howe
- General William Howe, 5th Viscount Howe
- Major-General David Howell
- Major-General Buster Howes
- General Sir Geoffrey Howlett
- Brigadier-General A. B. Hubback
- Major-General Sir Hubert Huddleston
- Brigadier Charles Edward Hudson
- General Sir Havelock Hudson
- Lieutenant-General Sir John Hudson
- Lieutenant-General Sir Peter Hudson
- Brigadier Reginald Keith Hudson CBE, Army Catering Corps
- Brigadier Andrew Gordon Hughes
- Major-General Christopher Glyn Sheridan Hughes
- Major-General Sir Ivor Hughes
- Brigadier John Salisbury Hughes
- General Sir William Templer Hughes
- Major-General Sir David Hughes-Morgan, 3rd Baronet.
- Major-General Sir Charles Hull
- Field Marshal Sir Richard Hull
- Major-General Jerrie Anthony Hulme CB, Royal Army Ordnance Corps
- Major-General Richard Hulse
- Field Marshal Sir Samuel Hulse
- Major-General William Hulton-Harrop
- Major-General John Humfrey
- Major-General Simon Lea Humphrey
- Lieutenant-General Sir Thomas Humphreys
- General Sir Peter Hunt
- Brigadier Sir Miles Hunt-Davis
- Major-General Sir Alan Hunter
- General Sir Archibald Hunter
- General Sir Martin Hunter
- Lieutenant-General Peter Hunter
- Robert Hunter
- Brigadier Tony Hunter
- Major-General Thomas Hunter-Blair
- Brigadier Tony Hunter-Choat
- Lieutenant-General Sir Aylmer Hunter-Weston
- Major-General Michael Huntley
- General John Huske
- Brigadier-General Arthur Herbert Hussey
- Major-General Robert Hutchison, 1st Baron Hutchison of Montrose
- Lieutenant-General Sir Balfour Hutchison
- Major-General (George) Malcolm Hutchinson
- Lieutenant-General Sir Edward Huthwaite
- Lieutenant-General Sir Edward Hutton
- Brigadier Geoffrey William Hutton
- Lieutenant-General Sir Thomas Jacomb Hutton
- General Sir Charles Huxtable
- Major-General Tim Hyams
- Henry Hyde, Royal Engineers
- Brigadier Henry Hugh Gordon Hyslop

== I ==
- Major-General James Illingworth
- Brigadier Cecil Edward Ronald Ince (1897–1988)
- Brigadier-General Adrian Beare Incledon-Webber, GOC Infantry Brigade
- Field Marshal Peter Inge, Baron Inge
- Brigadier-General Charles St Maur Ingham, CRA
- Major-General Francis Inglefield
- Brigadier-General John Darnley Ingles, GOC Infantry Brigade
- Brigadier Frederick Reed Inglis (1896— )
- Major-General George Henry Inglis, (1902–1979)
- Major-General Sir John Drummond Inglis, Colonel-Commandant, Royal Engineers (1895–1965)
- Lieutenant-General Sir William Inglis
- Major-General Edward Charles Ingouville-Williams, GOC Infantry Division
- Brigadier David James Innes OBE, Royal Green Jackets
- Lieutenant-General James John McLeod Innes
- Brigadier John Innes (1907— )
- Brigadier Ian Peter Inshaw
- Major-General Timothy Gordon Inshaw
- Major-General Tim Inskip (1885–1971)
- Brigadier Hugo Ironside
- Field Marshal William Edmund Ironside, 1st Baron Ironside, GOC Infantry Brigade
- Brigadier-General Alfred Ernest Irvine, GOC Infantry Brigade
- Major-General Godfrey George Howy Irving, GOC Infantry Brigade
- Lieutenant-General Sir Alistair Irwin
- Brigadier Angus Irwin
- Major-General Brian St. George Irwin
- Major-General Sir James Murray Irwin, Defence Medical Services
- General Sir John Irwin
- Lieutenant-General Noel Mackintosh Stuart Irwin (1892–1972)
- Major-General Stephen Fenemore Irwin (1895–1964)
- Major-General Donald Edward Isles
- General Hastings Ismay, 1st Baron Ismay (1887–1965)
- Major-General Peter Walter Ernest Istead
- Brigadier Thomas Ivor-Moore (1897–1946)

== J ==
- Brigadier-General Archibald Jack
- Brigadier-General James Lochhead Jack
- Major-General Alexander Cosby Jackson
- Brigadier Alexander Cosby Fishburn Jackson
- Brigadier Andrew Timothy Jackson
- Brigadier-General Arnold Jackson (1891–1972)
- Brigadier Cecil William Staveley Jackson
- Major-General George Jackson
- General Sir Henry Jackson
- Brigadier John Albert Jackson
- Major-General Sir Louis Charles Jackson
- General Sir Mike Jackson
- Lieutenant-General Sir Richard Downes Jackson
- Brigadier-General Thomas Dare Jackson, 2nd Baronet
- Brigadier Thomas Graeme Hogarth Jackson
- General Sir William Jackson
- Field Marshal Sir Claud Jacob
- Major-General Sir George Le Grand Jacob
- Major-General Herbert Jacob (1806–1890)
- Lieutenant-General Sir Ian Jacob
- Brigadier-General John Jacob (1812–1858)
- Brigadier-General Cyril Henry Leigh James
- Brigadier Edward Antrobus James (1899–1976)
- Major-General Sir Henry James
- Brigadier Manley James (VC) (1896–1975)
- Brigadier Rolph Noel Richmond Perry James CBE (1930–2010), Royal Engineers
- Lieutenant-General Sir George Inglis Jameson
- Brigadier Sir Melville Jameson
- Major-General Mervyn Janes
- Lieutenant-General Paul Jaques
- Major-General Sir Colin Arthur Jardine, 3rd Baronet
- Brigadier Sir Ian Liddell Jardine, 4th Baronet
- Brigadier-General James Bruce Jardine
- Major-General Tony Jeapes
- Major-General Sir Millis Jefferis
- Brigadier Julian Jefferson (1899–1966)
- Major-General Hugh Crozier Jeffrey FRCP CBE (1914–1976), Queens' Honorary Surgeon, Royal Army Medical Corps
- Brigadier-General Patrick Douglas Jeffreys (1848–1922)
- Major-General Edmund Richard Jeffreys
- General George Jeffreys, 1st Baron Jeffreys
- Major-General Alexander Jenkins (c. 1827–1902), Madras Staff Corps
- Major-General Charles Vernon Jenkins (1830–1901), Bengal Staff Corps
- Major-General David Jenkins
- Major General Gwyn Jenkins
- Major-General Charles James Jennings (c. 1832–1902), Madras Staff Corps
- Major-General Henry Edward Jerome
- Major-General Richard Martyn Jerram MBE CB (1928–1993), Royal Tank Regiment
- Lieutenant-General Sir William Jervois
- Lieutenant-General Sir Hugh Jeudwine
- Brigadier Thomas Smith "T.S." Jobson
- Brigadier Lewis Johnman TD CBE, Territorial, Auxiliary and Volunteer Reserve Association
- Major-General Dudley Johnson,VC
- General Sir Edwin Beaumont Johnson
- General Sir Garry Johnson
- Major-General Sir George Johnson
- Brigadier Peter Dunbar Johnson (1931–2023), ADC to the Queen
- Brigadier-General Alexander Johnston
- Brigadier-General Francis Earl Johnston
- Major-General George Napier Johnston
- Major-General James Alexander Deans Johnston OBE MC (1911–1988), Royal Army Medical Corps
- Major-General James Frederick Junor Johnston (1939–2006), Royal Electrical and Mechanical Engineers
- Lieutenant-General Sir Maurice Johnston (1929–2024), Deputy Chief of the Defence Staff
- Brigadier-General Thomas Kelly Evans Johnston
- Major-General Robert Maxwell Johnstone
- Lieutenant-General William Johnstone (1736–1802), Royal Artillery
- Major-General David Jolliffe
- General Sir Alan Jolly
- Major-General Anthony Jones, MC
- General Sir Charles Phibbs Jones
- General Sir Edward Jones
- General Sir Harry Jones
- Major-General Inigo Jones
- Lieutenant General Ivan Jones
- Major-General Sir John Thomas Jones
- Brigadier-General Lumley Jones
- Brigadier-General Morey Quayle Jones CB CMG CBE DL
- Lieutenant-General Philip David Jones
- Lieutenant-General Richard Jones KCB (1754–1835)
- Major-General Rupert Jones
- Lieutenant-General Sir Love Jones-Parry
- Major-General Stanley William Joslin
- Lieutenant-General David Judd CB (1950— )

== K ==
- Major-General Jamie Kadolski
- Brigadier-General Richard Kane
- Brigadier Antony Edward Kent Karslake
- Lieutenant-General Sir Charles Kavanagh
- Brigadier-General Sir William Algernon Ireland Kay, 6th Baronet
- Major-General William Heape Kay
- Brigadier-General Walpole Swinton Kays
- Lieutenant-General John Keane, 1st Baron Keane
- Lieutenant-General Hussey Fane Keane CB (1822–1895), Royal Engineers
- Lieutenant-General Sir John Manly Arbuthnot Keane, 3rd Baron Keane GCB GCH (1816–1901), Rifle Brigade (The Prince Consort's Own) Captain
- Brigadier-General Sir Harvey Kearsley
- Lieutenant-General Sir Henry Sheehy Keating
- Lieutenant-General Richard Harte Keatinge
- Major-General Andrew Myles Keeling CB CBE
- Brigadier John James Keeling
- General Sir Charles Keightley
- Major-General Richard Keightley
- Major-General Richard Keith-Jones
- Major-General Robert Kekewich
- Major-General Sir Vernon Kell
- Major-General Francis Kelly
- Brigadier-General Sir Philip James Vandeleur Kelly
- Brigadier Reginald James Neil Kelly CBE, Royal Engineers, Postal and Courier
- General Sir Thomas Kelly-Kenny
- General Sir Arnold Burrowes Kemball
- Major-General Sir George Kemball
- General Sir James Kempt
- Brigadier Tony Kendall
- Major-General Sir Douglas Kendrew
- Brigadier Roy Edwin Kendrick
- Brigadier-General Paul Aloysius Kenna VC DSO
- Major-General Alasdair Ian Gordon Kennedy CB CBE LVO, Gentleman Usher to the Queen
- Major-General Alfred Kennedy
- Major-General Sir John Kennedy
- Major-General Sir John Noble Kennedy
- Major-General Andrew Kennett
- General Sir Brian Kenny
- Field Marshal Prince Edward, Duke of Kent and Strathearn
- Katharine, Duchess of Kent
- Major-General Edward Ranulph Kenyon
- Major-General Lionel Richard Kenyon
- Brigadier Mark Peter Kenyon
- Lieutenant-General Sir Alfred Keogh
- General Sir William Keppel GCB ( —1834)
- Lieutenant-General William Keppel (1727–1782), 67th (South Hampshire) Regiment of Foot
- Walter Ker
- Brigadier Graham Kerr
- General Lord Mark Kerr
- Major-General Lord Ralph Drury Kerr
- Major-General Sir Reginald Kerr
- General Sir Edward Kerrison, 1st Baronet
- Major-General Berthold Wells Key
- Brigadier-General Sir Terence Keyes
- Brigadier Mohammad Akbar Khan, the first Muslim Brigadier of the British Indian Army
- Lieutenant-General Sir Launcelot Kiggell
- Brigadier Sir Alexander Herbert Killick
- Brigadier Joseph Edward "Ted" Killick (c. 1933–2020)
- General Francis Needham, 1st Earl of Kilmorey
- Lieutenant-General Sir Brian Kimmins
- Major-General Oliver John Kinahan
- Brigadier John William Martin Kincaid
- Brigadier Hugh Kindersley, 2nd Baron Kindersley
- General Sir Frank King
- Brigadier Horace Townshend Stuart King
- Brigadier John Christopher Law King
- Major-General Robert King
- General Evelyn Pierrepont, 2nd Duke of Kingston-upon-Hull
- Brigadier Brian Kingzett
- Brigadier-General Sir David Alexander Kinloch, 11th Baronet.
- Brigadier David Charles Kirk
- General Sir Walter Kirke
- Major-General Lamont Kirkland
- Major-General John Mather Kirkman
- General Sir Sidney Kirkman
- General Sir George Kirkpatrick
- Major-General William Kirkpatrick
- Lieutenant-General Sir Bertram Kirwan
- Brigadier Frederick Kisch
- Lieutenant-General Sir John Kiszely
- Field Marshal Herbert Kitchener, 1st Earl Kitchener
- Lieutenant-General Sir Walter Kitchener
- General Sir Frank Kitson
- Brigadier Gordon Sherwin Knight
- Brigadier-General Henry Lewkenor Knight
- General William Knollys
- General Sir William Thomas Knollys
- Lieutenant-General Sir Harold Edwin Knott
- Major-General Sir Charles Knowles
- Major-General Sir Alexander Knox
- Major-General Sir Alfred Knox
- Lieutenant-General Sir Charles Edmond Knox
- General Sir Harry Knox
- Lieutenant-General Sir William Knox
- Major-General Samuel Knox-Lecky CB OBE, Royal Electrical and Mechanical Engineers
- Major-General Harry Knutton

== L ==
- Lieutenant-General Thomas Edgar Lacy
- Brigadier Mark Lacey
- General Gerard Lake, 1st Viscount Lake (1744–1808)
- Lieutenant-General Sir Percy Lake
- Major-General Simon Lalor
- Major-General Charles F. G. Lamb ( —1902), Bengal Staff Corps
- Lieutenant-General Sir Graeme Lamb
- General Sir John Lambert
- Major-General Thomas Stanton Lambert
- Brigadier-General the Honourable Charles Lambton
- General John Lambton
- Major-General the Honourable Sir William Lambton
- Major-General George Lammie
- Brigadier-General Frank Grimshaw Lagier Lamotte
- Major General Mark Lancaster, Baron Lancaster of Kimbolton
- Brigadier Anthony Landale
- Major-General Herman Landon
- Major-General Barry Lane
- Lieutenant-General Sir Derek Lang
- Brigadier Thomas Harold Lang
- Major-General Algernon Philip Yorke Langhorne
- Brigadier-General Harold Stephen Langhorne
- Major-General Sir Desmond Langley
- General Sir George Colt Langley, Royal Marines
- Lieutenant-General Francis Lascelles
- Major-General Christopher Neville Last
- Brigadier Henry Beveridge Latham
- General Sir Gerald Lathbury
- Major General Michael Ivan Laurie
- Major General Sir John Laurie, 6th Baronet
- Brigadier Sir Percy Laurie
- General Sir Robert Laurie, 5th Baronet
- Major-General Rufus Laurie
- Lieutenant-General Robert Law
- Lieutenant-General Sir Sydney Turing Barlow Lawford
- General Sir Arthur Johnstone Lawrence
- Brigadier-General Charles Lawrence
- Lieutenant-General Sir George St Patrick Lawrence
- Brigadier-General Sir Henry Montgomery Lawrence
- General Sir Herbert Lawrence
- Major-General John Craig Lawrence
- Major-General Stringer Lawrence
- Major-General Charles Lawrie
- Lieutenant-General Sir Henry Merrick Lawson
- General Sir Richard Lawson (1927–2023), Commander-in-Chief, Allied Forces Northern Europe
- Brigadier Sir Joseph Frederick Laycock
- Major-General Sir Robert Laycock
- Lieutenant-General Sir George Lea
- General Sir Edward Leach
- Brigadier-General Henry Leach
- Lieutenant-General David Leakey
- Brigadier Duncan Learmont Commander 15th A.A. Brigade, Gibraltar.
- General Sir John Learmont
- Major-General Anthony de Camborne Lowther Leask OBE CBE CB, Scots Guards
- Lieutenant-General Sir Henry Leask
- Major-General Reginald Carteret de Mussenden Leathes
- Brigadier William Abbott Le Blanc-Smith
- Major-General James Stuart Lee
- Brigadier Sir Leonard Henry Lee Kt CBE, Royal Armoured Corps
- Brigadier-General Noel Lee
- Major-General Patrick Herbert Lee
- Major-General John Leech-Porter
- Lieutenant-General Sir Oliver Leese
- Major-General William Knox Leet
- Major-General Roger Eustace Le Fleming
- Lieutenant-General Sir John Henry Lefroy
- Brigadier-General Percy Legard
- General Edward Owen Leggatt (c. 1825–1902), Madras Staff Corps
- General the Honourable Arthur Legge
- Brigadier-General William Kaye Legge
- General Sir Baldwin Leighton, 6th Baronet (1747–1828)
- General Francis Leighton
- Major-General Sir Wykeham Leigh Pemberton
- Lieutenant-General Sir William Boog Leishman
- Lieutenant-General Sir James Leith
- General Alexander Leith Hay
- Brigadier-General Sir Edward Thomas Le Marchant, Bt.
- Major-General John Le Marchant (1766–1812)
- Lieutenant-General Sir John Le Marchant (1803–1874)
- General Sir Peter Leng
- General Lord George Lennox
- Lieutenant-General Sir Wilbraham Lennox
- Lieutenant-General Walter Lentaigne
- Brigadier-General Nicholas Lepell (formerly Claus Wedig von Lepel)
- Major-General Alexander Leslie (1731–1794)
- Lieutenant-General Sir Frederick Lester
- Major-General John Sydney Lethbridge
- Major-General Peter Leuchars
- Lieutenant-General David Leslie, 3rd Earl of Leven
- Brigadier-General Hugh Nugent Leveson-Gower
- Brigadier-General Philip Leveson-Gower
- Brigadier-General Charles George Lewes
- Major-General Ernest Lewin
- Major-General Alfred George Lewis
- Brigadier-General Bridges George Lewis
- Brigadier David Llewellyn Lewis
- Major-General Harold Victor Lewis (1887–1945), Razmak Brigade CO, Jullundur Area CO, Army Headquarters India Deputy QMG
- Major-General Kenneth Frank Mackay Lewis
- Brigadier Sir Rainald Gilfrid Lewthwaite CVO OBE MC Croix de Guerre with palm (1913–2003), 2nd Battalion Scots Guards, 10th Battalion, Parachute Regiment
- Major-General Bill Liardet
- Major-General Sir Claude Liardet
- General Sir Clive Liddell
- Lieutenant-General Stafford Lightburne
- Lieutenant-General Edward Ligonier, 1st Earl Ligonier
- Field Marshal John Ligonier, 1st Earl Ligonier
- Brigadier-General Luke Lillingstone
- Lieutenant-General Louis Lillywhite
- Brigadier-General Charles Lionel Lindemann ( —1970)
- Major-General Sir Patrick Lindesay
- Major-General John Lindley
- Major-General George Lindsay
- Lieutenant-General the Honourable Sir James Lindsay
- Major-General Sir Henry Lindsay Bethune
- Brigadier Robert Lindsell
- Lieutenant-General Sir Wilfrid Gordon Lindsell
- Lieutenant-General Albemarle Bertie, 9th Earl of Lindsey
- Brigadier Anthony Fergus Sarel Ling
- Major-General Fergus Ling
- Major-General Louis Lipsett
- Brigadier Anthony Onslow Laurence Lithgow
- General Sir Archibald Little
- Brigadier-General Malcolm Orme Little (1857–1931)
- Brigadier Peter Anthony Little
- Lieutenant-General Sir John Hunter Littler
- Brigadier-General Robert Livesay (1876–1946)
- Major-General Brian Livesey CB, Royal Army Medical Corps
- Brigadier-General Guy Livingston
- Major-General Sir Hubert Armine Anson Livingstone CMG CB, Royal Engineers
- Brigadier Anthony William Allen Llewellen Palmer
- Major-General Morgan Llewellyn
- Brigadier-General Arthur Henry Orlando Lloyd CVO, Grenadier Guards Captain
- Lieutenant-General Sir Francis Lloyd
- Brigadier-General Horace Giesler Lloyd
- Major-General Sir Owen Edward Pennefather Lloyd
- Major-General Wilfrid Lewis Lloyd
- Major-General the Honourable Sir Savage Lloyd-Mostyn
- Major-General David Lloyd Owen
- Major-General Gerald Lloyd-Verney (1900–1957)
- Major-General Edward Loch, 2nd Baron Loch
- Lieutenant-General Sir Kenneth Loch
- Major-General Rupert Lochner
- General Sir Rob Lockhart
- General Sir William Lockhart
- Major-General Henry Frederick Lockyer
- Brigadier Robert Guy Loder-Symonds DSO MC (1913–1945), Royal Artillery
- General Sir Charles Loewen
- Major-General Frederick Joseph Loftus-Tottenham
- Lieutenant-General Samuel Lomax
- Brigadier Robert Long
- Lieutenant-General Robert Ballard Long
- Brigadier-General Walter Long
- Air Vice Marshal Sir Charles Longcroft
- General Sir Henry Errington Longden
- Brigadier Desmond Longfield
- General John Longfield
- Brigadier-General Thomas Pakenham, 5th Earl of Longford
- General William Pakenham, 4th Earl of Longford
- Brigadier Thomas Longland
- Major-General Errol Lonsdale
- Brigadier Robert William Allan Lonsdale
- Major-General Wilfrid Austin Lord
- Lieutenant-General Sir John Lorimer KCB DSO MBE
- Lieutenant-General William Kerr, 2nd Marquess of Lothian
- General William Kerr, 4th Marquess of Lothian
- Brigadier Alasdair William Buist Loudon
- Major General Euan Loudon
- General John Campbell, 4th Earl of Loudoun
- Major-General Robert Beverley Loudoun
- Major-General Sir Charles Louis, 4th Baronet (1813–1900), Royal Marines Colonel Commandant
- Major-General James Louis CB DSO OBE, No. 48 (Royal Marine) Commando CO
- General Simon Fraser of Lovat, 78th Fraser Highlanders
- Major-General Simon Fraser, 14th Lord Lovat
- General Sir Frederick Love
- Brigadier Raymond Love, Commander R.A. Gibraltar
- Major-General Beresford Lovett
- General Sir John Low
- Brigadier-General Arthur Cecil Lowe
- Brigadier Brian Jeremy Lowe
- Lieutenant-General Sir Hudson Lowe
- Major-General William Lowe
- Lieutenant-General Robert William Lowry
- Major-General Sir Cecil Lowther
- General Sir Charles Loyd
- Major-General Charles Luard
- Lieutenant-General Richard Luard
- Field Marshal George Bingham, 3rd Earl of Lucan
- General Sir Alfred Lucas
- Major-General Cuthbert Henry Tindall Lucas
- Brigadier-General Frederic George Lucas
- Brigadier Frederick John Lucas
- General Sir George Luck
- General George Ludlow, 3rd Earl Ludlow
- Major-General Sir Henry Lukin
- General Henry Lumley
- Major-General Sir James Rutherford Lumley
- General Sir William Lumley
- Brigadier-General Alfred Forbes Lumsden, Royal Scots
- Brigadier-General Frederick William Lumsden
- Lieutenant-General Sir Harry Burnett Lumsden
- Lieutenant-General Herbert Lumsden
- Lieutenant-General Sir Otto Marling Lund
- Major-General James Lunt
- Brigadier Maurice Stanley Lush
- General Sir James Lushington
- Brigadier Richard Neville Wolfe Lydekker
- Major-General Sir Arthur Lynden-Bell
- Major-General Lewis Lyne
- General Thomas Graham, 1st Baron Lynedoch
- Brigadier-General Charles Lyon
- Brigadier Cyril Arthur Lyon (1880–1955), Ceylon GOC, Penang Fortress Commandment
- Lieutenant-General Sir James Frederick Lyon
- Major-General Robert Lyon
- Brigadier Tristram Lyon-Smith (1895–1982)
- Major-General Adrian William Lyons
- Lieutenant-General Humphrey Lyons
- General Thomas Lyons
- General Sir Daniel Lysons
- Lieutenant-General Harry Hammon Lyster
- Major-General Simon William St John Lytle (1940–2004), Royal Irish Fusiliers, Army Air Corps Director, Royal Irish Rangers
- General Sir Neville Lyttelton
- Lieutenant-General Sir Richard Lyttelton
- Lieutenant-General Sir Arthur Lyttelton-Annesley
- Brigadier Owen Lyttle

== M ==
- Brigadier John Malcolm Macfarlane, Director of Army Education. First Gaelic speaking Brigadier in the British Army
- Major-General Sir Henry Macandrew
- Lieutenant-General Sir Edward Macarthur
- Lieutenant-General Sir William MacArthur
- Lieutenant-General Colin Macaulay
- Brigadier-General Sir Charles MacCarthy
- General Alastair Macdonald
- Lieutenant-General Godfrey Macdonald, 3rd Baron Macdonald of Sleat
- Major-General Sir Hector MacDonald
- Lieutenant-General the Honourable James William Bosville Macdonald
- Lieutenant-General Sir John Macdonald
- Brigadier John Alexander MacLean Macdonald
- Major-General John Donald MacDonald
- Major-General Hugh Macdonald-Smith
- General Sir James Macdonnell
- Lieutenant-General Sir George Macdonogh
- General Sir Patrick Leonard MacDougall
- Lieutenant-General Hay MacDowall
- Major-General William Thomson Macfarlane
- Brigadier-General Andrew Laurie Macfie
- Major-General Sir Charles MacGregor
- Brigadier General Charles Reginald Macgregor
- Brigadier Sir Gregor MacGregor, 6th Baronet
- Brigadier Robert Brian Macgregor-Oakford CBE MC, Durham Light Infantry
- Brigadier-General Duncan Sayre MacInnes
- Brigadier Alex Macintosh CBE
- Major-General Donald Macintyre, VC (1831–1903)
- Lieutenant-General John Mackenzie Macintyre (1827–1902)
- Brigadier James Mackaness
- General Alexander Mackay
- Major General Andrew Mackay
- Brigadier Ian Mackay
- Major-General Sir Iain Mackay-Dick
- Major-General Sir Alexander Mackenzie of Coul, Bt.
- Major-General Sir Colin Mackenzie
- General Sir Jeremy Mackenzie
- Major-General John Randoll Mackenzie
- Kenneth MacKenzie
- Brigadier Maurice Rapinet Mackenzie
- Lieutenant-General Alexander Mackenzie-Fraser
- Brigadier Archibald Gordon MacKenzie-Kennedy CBE DSO, Infantry
- Brigadier Neil Mackereth
- Brigadier William Alan Mackereth
- Brigadier Sir Harry Mackeson
- Major-General Pierse Joseph Mackesy
- Brigadier William Stewart Young Mackie
- General Sir Henry Mackinnon
- Lieutenant-General Allan Thomas Maclean of Pennycross (1793–1868), Light Dragoons
- Major-General Henry John Maclean (1827–1915), Rifle Brigade (The Prince Consort's Own) Assistant Adjutant and Deputy QMG
- Major-General Sir Fitzroy Maclean, 1st Baronet
- General Sir Fitzroy Jeffreys Grafton Maclean, 8th Baronet of Morvern
- Major-General Peter Maclean of Lazonby Hall (1813–1901), Royal Artillery
- Major-General (Andrew) Patrick Withy MacLellan (1925–2024), Resident Governor of the Tower of London and Keeper of the Jewel House
- Major-General Charles William Macleod RASC (1881–1944)
- Lieutenant-General Sir John Macleod
- General Sir Gordon MacMillan
- Lieutenant-General Sir John MacMillan KCB CBE (1932–), General Officer Commanding Scotland
- Brigadier Francis Grahame MacMullen
- Major-General Hugh Tennent MacMullen
- General Sir Norman MacMullen
- Lieutenant-General Sir George Fletcher MacMunn
- Brigadier-General Colin Lawrence Macnab
- Brigadier Sir Geoffrey Macnab
- Brigadier John Francis Macnab
- Brigadier-General Ernest Macnaghten
- Lieutenant-General Sir Herbert Macpherson
- Major-General Sir James Duncan Macpherson
- Major-General Sir William Macpherson
- Major-General Lachlan Macquarie
- Lieutenant-General Sir Gordon Macready, Bt.
- Brigadier-General John Macready
- General Sir Nevil Macready
- Brigadier Maurice MacWilliam
- Brigadier-General William Robarts Napier Madocks
- Lieutenant Generał Robert Magowan
- General Sir Bryan Mahon
- Brigadier Edmond Ronayne Mahony
- Major-General Cecil Wilmot Mainprise
- Brigadier Hugh Salusbury Kynaston Mainwaring
- General Sir Alexander Maitland, 1st Baronet
- General Charles Maitland
- General Frederick Maitland
- Major-General Frederick Colthurst Maitland
- General Sir Peregrine Maitland
- Lieutenant-General Sir Thomas Maitland
- Major-General Edward Maitland-Makgill-Crichton
- Major-General Vivian Majendie
- Major-General James Herbert Samuel Majury CB MBE, West Midland District GOC
- Brigadier-General Sir Ernest Makins
- Major-General Sir John Malcolm
- Brigadier Aubertin Walter Sothern Mallaby
- Major-General Sir Wilfrid Malleson
- Brigadier Allan Mallinson
- Major-General Christopher Maltby
- Major-General Christopher Man
- Major-General Henry Stuart Man
- Major-General Patrick Man
- Brigadier-General Sir Harry Osborne Mance
- Major-General James Mandeville-Hackett
- Major-General Desmond Mangham
- Major-General Courtenay Clarke Manifold KCB CMG (1864–1957), Indian Medical Services
- Major-General Lord Charles Manners (died 1761)
- General Lord Charles Manners (1780–1855)
- Major-General Lord Robert Manners (British Army officer, born 1781)
- General Lord Robert Manners (British Army general)
- Brigadier-General Sir William Manning
- Major-General Edmund Manningham Manningham-Buller
- Lieutenant-General Sir Mark Mans
- Major-General Rowland Mans
- General Sir Robert Mansergh
- Brigadier Christopher James Marchant-Smith CBE, Green Howards, 15th Infantry Brigade
- Brigadier Brian Hedley Marciandi
- Lieutenant-General Sir Edwin Markham
- Charles Spencer, 3rd Duke of Marlborough
- General John Churchill, 1st Duke of Marlborough
- Brigadier Simon John Marriner
- Major-General Sir John Charles Oakes Marriott
- Major-General Patrick Marriott
- Major-General Francis Marshall
- Lieutenant-General Sir Frederick Marshall
- Major-General Roger Sydenham Marshall CB TD, Army Legal Services Branch
- Major-General Roy Stuart Marshall OBE MC MM, Royal Artillery
- Lieutenant-General Sir William Marshall
- General Sir James Marshall-Cornwall
- Major-General Edward Charles Marston (c. 1822 – 1902), Bombay Army
- Lieutenant-General Sir Giffard LeQuesne Martel
- Major-General Sir Horace Martelli
- Major-General Richard James Coombe Marter (1833–1902), King's Dragoon Guards
- Lieutenant-General Sir Alfred Martin
- Brigadier-General Cuthbert Thomas Martin, 151st Infantry Brigade, Highland Light Infantry
- Major-General J. S. S. Martin
- Brigadier-General Arundel Martyn
- Mary, Princess Royal and Countess of Harewood CI GCStJ GBE GCVO TD RRC, honorary Royal Scots Colonel-in-Chief, honorary Royal Corps of Signals Colonel-in-Chief, honorary West Yorkshire Regiment Colonel-in-Chief, Princess Mary's Royal Air Force Nursing Service Air Chief Commandment
- Brigadier-General Samuel Masham, 1st Baron Masham
- Brigadier Harvey Christopher Mason
- Major-General Jeff Mason
- Lieutenant-General Sir Noel Mason-Macfarlane
- Brigadier-General Edward Charles Massy
- Lieutenant-General Hugh Massy
- Lieutenant-General William Massy
- Brigadier Tim Massy-Beresford
- General Sir Torquhil Matheson
- Major-General Charles Massy Mathew
- Lieutenant-General Montague James Mathew
- Major-General Francis Matthews
- Major-General Michael Matthews CB DL, Engineer-in-Chief
- Brigadier Christian George Maude
- General Sir Frederick Francis Maude
- Lieutenant-General Sir Frederick Stanley Maude
- Brigadier Neil Stanley Eustace Maude
- Major-General Henry Barlow Maule
- Brigadier Mark Stuart Ker Maunsell
- Brigadier Raymond John Maunsell
- Major-General Sir Frederick Maurice
- Major-General Sir John Frederick Maurice
- General Sir Ivor Maxse
- Major-General Aymer Maxwell, 8th Baronet (1911–1987)
- Lieutenant-General Sir Charles William Maxwell CB (1775–1848)
- Brigadier-General Francis Aylmer Maxwell
- General Sir John Maxwell
- Brigadier John Pollock Maxwell
- Lieutenant-General Sir Ronald Charles Maxwell
- Major-General Sir Edward Sinclair May
- Brigadier Peter Harry Mitchell May
- General Sir Reginald May
- Lieutenant-General Sir Simon Mayall
- Brigadier-General Sir Henry Maybury
- Major-General Brian Mayes
- Brigadier Francis Herbert Maynard
- General Sir Mosley Mayne
- Major-General Robert William Montgomery McAfee CB, Royal Tank Regiment
- Major-General Ronald William Lorne McAlister CB OBE (1923–2015)
- Brigadier Douglas McAlpine
- Major-General William McBean
- Major-General Sir Hugh McCalmont
- Brigadier-General Sir Robert McCalmont
- Major-General Colin Thomas McClean
- General William Anson McCleverty
- General Sir John McColl
- Major-General Douglas McConnel
- Brigadier Norman Duncan McCorquodale (1898–1971)
- Lieutenant-General Sir Frederick McCracken
- General Sir Richard McCreery
- Major-General Sir Andrew McCulloch
- Brigadier Bruce McDermott
- Brigadier-General Robert McDouall
- Major-General Robert McDouall
- Major-General Sir Andrew McDowall
- Major-General David McDowall
- Major-General John McGhie
- Major-General Allan McGill CB CBE, Corps of Royal Electrical and Mechanical Engineers
- Brigadier Ian Donald Tyndale McGill CBE ADC, Royal Engineers
- Major-General Nigel Harry Duncan McGill CB
- Major-General Brendan McGuinness
- Major-General Alexander Anderson McHardy
- Major-General John Antony McIlvenna CB, Army Legal Services Branch
- Major-General Alexander Matthew McKay CB (1921–1999), Corps of Royal Electrical and Mechanical Engineers Colonel Commandment
- Brigadier-General Augustus de Segur McKerrell CB
- Brigadier James Francis Scott McLaren
- Lieutenant-General Sir Kenneth McLean
- Brigadier Allan McLeod
- Lieutenant-General Sir Donald Kenneth McLeod
- Lieutenant-General Sir John Chetham McLeod
- Lieutenant-General Sir Roderick McLeod
- Lieutenant-General Sir Thomas McMahon, 2nd Baronet
- Lieutenant-General Sir Terence McMeekin
- Major-General Neil McMicking
- General Sir William McMurdo
- Brigadier-General Arthur George McNalty CMG CBE (1871–1958), Royal Army Service Corps
- Lieutenant-General Sir Arthur McNamara
- Major-General Sir John McNeill
- Major-General John Malcolm McNeill
- Brigadier-General Dougal Campbell McPherson MBE , British Expeditionary Force
- General Sir Richard John Meade
- Lieutenant-General Henry Meade-Hamilton
- Brigadier-General Reginald Brabazon, 13th Earl of Meath, 4th Guards Brigade
- Brigadier Edgar Julius Medley
- General Sir William Medows
- Brigadier Helen Guild Meechie CBE (1938–2000), Women's Royal Army Corps
- Brigadier Andrew Donisthorpe Meek CBE, Duke of Wellington's Regiment
- Major-General Anthony Leslie Meier CB OBE (1937–2022), Director General for Security and Intelligence, late Royal Corps of Transport
- Brigadier-General Sir William Hope Meiklejohn
- Major-General Sir Charles John Melliss
- Brigadier James Frederick Charles "Fred" Mellor
- Brigadier-General Sir James Gilbert Shaw Mellor
- Major-General Sir Peter Melvill
- General Robert Melvill
- General Henry Dundas, 3rd Viscount Melville
- Major-General Mungo Melvin
- General Sir Charles Menzies
- Lieutenant-General Robert Menzies
- Major-General Sir Stewart Menzies
- General Cavalié Mercer
- Major-General Sir David Mercer
- Major-General Sir Harvey Frederic Mercer
- Major-General Sir William Merewether
- Brigadier Robert Merrell
- General Sir Gordon Messenger
- General Sir Frank Messervy
- Major-General Graham Gerald Messervy-Whiting MBE, Intelligence Corps
- Major-General Vincent Metcalfe
- Field Marshal Paul Methuen, 3rd Baron Methuen
- Brigadier-General Sir Frederick Charlton Meyrick, 2nd Baronet
- Field Marshal Sir John Michel
- Major-General Sir Godwin Michelmore
- General George Middlemore
- General Sir Frederick Dobson Middleton
- Brigadier-General John Middleton
- Brigadier Robin Charles Middleton OBE (c. 1931 – 2019)
- Brigadier Joseph Hubbard Milburn CBE (c. 1933 – 2021), King's Own Royal Border Regiment
- Major-General Eric Grant Miles
- Lieutenant-General Sir Herbert Miles
- Major-General Austin Miller CB MC Croix de Guerre (1888–1947), 1st Battalion Sherwood Foresters, Northern Command
- Major-General David Edwin Miller CB CBE MC (1931–1996), King's Own Royal Border Regiment colonel
- Lieutenant-General Sir Euan Miller
- Brigadier Archie Miller-Bakewell
- Major-General Giles Hallam Mills CB CVO OBE (1922–2011), Royal Green Jackets
- Major-General Graham Mills
- Lieutenant-General Francis Miles Milman
- Field Marshal George Milne, 1st Baron Milne
- Major-General John Milne
- General George Milner
- Brigadier-General George Francis Milner
- Major-General Tony Milton
- Major-General Patrick John O'Brien Minogue
- Major-General John Minshull-Ford
- Major-General Francis Mitchell
- Major-General Gerald Ian Mitchell CB MBE, Royal Electrical and Mechanical Engineers
- Major-General Bertram Mitford
- Lieutenant-General Sir Bertrand Richard Moberly
- Brigadier-General F.J. Moberly
- Major-General Arthur William Hamilton May Moens CB CMG DSO (1879–1939); 12th Frontier Force Regiment 2nd Battalion (Sikhs) colonel, Northern Command commander
- Lieutenant-General Sir Cameron Moffat
- Brigadier Nicky Moffat
- General Sir John Mogg
- Brigadier-General Alan James Gordon Moir CB CBE DSO (1873–1940), Royal Scots
- Lieutenant-General George Molesworth
- Field Marshal Richard Molesworth, 3rd Viscount Molesworth
- Major-General Gilbert Monckton, 2nd Viscount Monckton of Brenchley
- Lieutenant-General Robert Monckton
- Brigadier-General Ernest Money
- General John Money
- Brigadier-General Noel Money
- Major-General Robert Cotton Money
- General Sir Charles Monro, 1st Baronet
- Brigadier The Honourable Hugh Brisbane Henry Ewart Monro CBE, Queen's Own Highlanders (Seaforth and Camerons)
- Major General The Honourable Seymour Monro
- Major-General John Montagu, 2nd Duke of Montagu
- Brigadier-General Francis Stewart Montague-Bates
- Lieutenant-General The Hon. Sir Alan Richard Montagu-Stuart-Wortley
- Major-General The Hon. Edward Montagu-Stuart-Wortley
- Field Marshal François de La Rochefoucauld, Marquis de Montandre
- Lieutenant-General James Montgomerie
- Field Marshal Viscount Montgomery of Alamein
- Brigadier David Wyndham Montgomery
- Major-General Hugh Maude de Fellenberg Montgomery
- Major-General Robert Montgomery
- Field Marshal Sir Archibald Montgomery-Massingberd
- General Sir Alexander George Montgomery Moore
- Major-General Arthur Thomas Moore
- Major-General Denis Grattan Moore
- Brigadier Eric Edward James Moore
- Major-General Sir Jeremy Moore
- Lieutenant-General Sir John Moore
- Major-General Sir Lorenzo Moore
- General Sir Rodney Moore
- Major-General John Moore-Bick
- Brigadier-General Hubert Horatio Shirley Morant
- Lieutenant-General Harry Mordaunt
- General Sir John Mordaunt
- Lieutenant-General Charles Morgan
- Lieutenant-General Sir Frederick E. Morgan
- Brigadier-General J. H. Morgan
- General Sir William Duthie Morgan
- Brigadier Joan Moriarty
- General Sir Thomas Morland
- Brigadier Michael Frederick Morley (1911–1990)
- General Sir Thomas Morony
- General Sir Edwin Morris
- Brigadier Gary Stephen Morris CBE, Educational and Training Services Branch, Adjutant General's Corps
- Brigadier-General George Mortimer Morris
- Lieutenant-General John Ignatius Morris (1842–1902), Royal Marines
- Brigadier Richard John Morris
- General Staats Long Morris
- General George Morrison
- Brigadier-General Joseph Wanton Morrison
- Major-General Reginald Joseph Gordon Morrison
- Brigadier-General Edward Morton CBE
- Brigadier Peter Morton
- Major-General William Elliot Morton (1821–1902), Royal Engineers
- General Sir David Mostyn
- General John Mostyn
- Major-General Stanley Mott
- Major-General J. E. B. Seely, 1st Baron Mottistone
- Major-General John Frederick Mottram CB OBE, Royal Marines
- Brigadier Ronald Gervase Mountain
- Major-General Berkeley Moynihan, 1st Baron Moynihan
- General Henry Phipps, 1st Earl of Mulgrave
- Major-General Sir Herbert Mullaly
- Lieutenant-General Sir Anthony Mullens
- Major-General Richard Lucas Mullens
- Brigadier William Richard Mundell
- General Sir Hector Munro, 8th of Novar
- Major-General Sir Thomas Munro, 1st Baronet
- Lieutenant-General William Munro (died 1821)
- Lieutenant-General William Munro (Maj-Gen 1837, Lt-Gen 1846)
- General William Munro
- Major-General William Munro
- Major-General George FitzClarence, 1st Earl of Munster
- Major-General Richard Murphy (1896–1971)
- Major-General Charles Murison
- General Sir Archibald Murray
- Brigadier Charles Allison Murray
- Brigadier Christopher John Murray CBE, Royal Logistic Corps
- General Sir George Murray
- Brigadier Sir George David Keith Murray
- General the Honourable Sir Henry Murray
- General Sir Horatius Murray
- General James Murray
- Major-General James Patrick Murray
- Lieutenant-General Sir James Wolfe Murray
- General Sir John Murray, 8th Baronet
- General Sir John Irvine Murray, KCB (1826–1902), British Indian Army
- Major-General Robert Murray CSI RA, Bengal Artillery, Bengal Staff Corps, Indian Telegraph Department Director-General
- Brigadier Terence Desmond Murray
- Lieutenant-General Sir Robert Murray Keith
- Major-General David Murray-Lyon
- Major-General Sir Evan John Murray-MacGregor Bt CB
- Brigadier-General Francis Clifton Muspratt
- Major-General Alfred Musson
- General Sir Geoffrey Musson
- Brigadier Alan Frederick Mutch CBE ADC, Royal Pioneer Corps
- Lieutenant-General Sir Joseph Muter
- Brigadier Eddie Myers
- Brigadier Andrew Dewe Myrtle CB CBE ADC, King's Own Scottish Borderers

== N ==
- Brigadier Noel Nagle
- General Sir Charles Edward Nairne
- Brigadier-General Edward Spencer Hoare Nairne
- Major-General Paul Nanson
- General Sir Charles James Napier
- Lieutenant-General Sir George Thomas Napier
- Major-General Lennox Napier
- Brigadier Philip Martin Lennox Napier
- Richard Stewart Napier
- Field Marshal Robert Napier, 1st Baron Napier of Magdala
- General Sir Thomas Napier
- Major-General William Craig Emilius Napier
- General Sir William Francis Patrick Napier
- Major-General Noel Warren Napier-Clavering DSO (1888–1964), British Military Mission to Egypt Head, Middle East Command Deputy Adjutant General
- Major-General Eric Paytherus Nares
- Major-General Sir Philip Arthur Manley Nash
- Brigadier Richard Nash
- Brigadier-General John Nation
- Major-General Murray Naylor
- Lieutenant-General Sir Philip Neame
- General Francis Needham, 1st Earl of Kilmorey (1748–1832), 86th Regiment of Foot
- Lieutenant-General Sir Alexander Nelson
- Major-General Sir John Nelson
- Brigadier-General Herbert Evan Charles Bayley Nepean
- Brigadier Alfred Geoffrey Neville
- Major-General Sir Robert Neville
- Major-General Sir Laurence New
- Brigadier Thomas Grindall Newbury
- Major-General Thomas Pelham-Clinton, 3rd Duke of Newcastle-under-Lyne
- Major-General Henry Newcome
- Lieutenant-General Sir Edward Newdegate
- Brigadier Michael John Newell
- Major-General Sir Foster Reuss Newland KCMG CB (1862–1943), Army Medical Services
- Lieutenant-General Sir Paul Raymond Newton
- Major-General Thomas Cochrane Newton
- Surgeon General Charles Edward Nichol CMG DSO (1859–1939), Army Medical Services
- Major-General Sir Christopher Havard Rice Nicholl KCB
- Brigadier David William Dillwyn Nicholl
- General Sir Edward Nicolls KCB, Royal Marines
- Brigadier John Nichols
- General Sir Cameron Nicholson
- Brigadier Claude Nicholson
- Lieutenant-General Sir Francis Nicholson
- Brigadier-General John Sanctuary Nicholson
- Major-General Sir Lothian Nicholson
- Lieutenant-General Sir Lothian Nicholson
- Lieutenant-General Robert Nicholson
- Field Marshal William Nicholson, 1st Baron Nicholson
- Major-General William Nickerson
- Lieutenant-General Sir William Nicolay
- General Henry Nicoll CB British Indian Army
- Brigadier-General Edmund Gustavus Nicolls CB CMG (1862–1932), Royal Garrison Artillery Inspector
- Lieutenant-General Sir Jasper Nicolls
- General Oliver Nicolls
- Brigadier Shirley Patricia Nield
- Major-General Manners Ralph Wilmott Nightingale
- Brigadier-General Lawrence Nilson
- Major General Robert Nitsch
- General Sir John Nixon
- Brigadier Mark Jonathan Dean Noble
- Brigadier Eileen Nolan
- Major-General Sir Amos Godsell Robert Norcott
- Lieutenant-General Sir William Sherbrooke Ramsey Norcott
- Major-General Miles Fitzalan-Howard, 17th Duke of Norfolk
- Major-General Charles Norman
- Field Marshal Sir Henry Wylie Norman
- Brigadier Hugh Ronald Norman
- Lieutenant-General Willoughby Norrie, 1st Baron Norrie
- Major-General Sir Edward Northey
- Lieutenant-General George FitzRoy, 1st Duke of Northumberland
- Lieutenant-General Hugh Percy, 2nd Duke of Northumberland
- General Chapple Norton
- Major-General Cyril Henry Norton
- Lieutenant-General Edward Felix Norton
- Major-General Edward Nugent Norton (1828–1900), Madras Staff Corps, Honorary Major-General
- Lieutenant General Sir George Norton
- Lieutenant-General Sir Francis Nosworthy
- Major-General Charles Roland Sykes Notley CB CBE (1939–2026), Royal Scots Dragoon Guards
- Lieutenant-General Richard Edward Nugee
- Field Marshal Sir George Nugent, 1st Baronet
- Brigadier-General George Colborne Nugent
- Brigadier Maurice Nugent CBE, Adjutant General's Corps, Royal Military Police
- Lieutenant-General Sir Archibald Nye

== O ==
- Lieutenant-General Sir Hildebrand Oakes, 1st Baronet
- Brigadier John Douglas Oborne
- Brigadier-General Edmund Donough John O'Brien
- Major-General Terence O'Brien (died 1865)
- Brigadier-General Joseph Patrick O'Brien Twohig
- Brigadier Derek Michael O'Callaghan CBE, 16th/5th The Queen's Royal Lancers
- Lieutenant-General The Hon. Sir Robert O'Callaghan
- Brigadier Michael James Palmer O'Cock CBE MC ADC (1919–2009), Foot Guards
- Lieutenant-General Sir Maurice Charles O'Connell
- Lieutenant-General Sir Denis O'Connor
- Major-General Sir Luke O'Connor
- General Sir Richard O'Connor
- Major-General Hugh O'Donnell
- General Sir Kevin O'Donoghue
- Brigadier Morgan John Winthrop O'Donovan
- Major-General Gordon Richard Oehlers CB (1933–2024), Colonel Commandant Royal Corps of Signals
- Major-General William James Officer
- General James Oglethorpe
- Major-General Robert Wanless O'Gowan
- Brigadier-General Charles Ogston
- General Charles O'Hara
- Brigadier Richard Norman Ohlenschlager
- Major-General Henry Thomas Oldfield (1831–1902), 6th Bengal Cavalry
- Major-General Sir Louis Oldfield, KBE, CB, CMG, DSO (1872–1949), Royal Artillery
- Major-General Richard Oldman
- General Sir Laurence Oliphant
- Brigadier John Henry Huby Oliver TD MRCS LRCP QHS OBE DL, General Medical Practitioner
- Major-General Richard Arthur Oliver CB OBE, Royal Engineers
- Lieutenant-General Sir William Oliver
- General Sir William Olpherts
- Major-General Sir Michael O'Moore Creagh
- Major-General David O'Morchoe
- General Denzil Onslow
- Lieutenant-General Richard Onslow
- Major-General Sir William Henry Onslow KCMG CB (1863–1929)
- Brigadier Sir Lawrence Wilfred Orchard (1891–1975)
- Brigadier Paul David Orchard-Lisle CB TD ADC, Royal Artillery, Territorial Army
- Major-General Sir Harry Ord
- Field Marshal George Hamilton, 1st Earl of Orkney
- Brigadier Denis Ormerod
- General James Butler, 2nd Duke of Ormonde
- Major-General Charles Boyle, 4th Earl of Orrery
- Brigadier-General Sir Norman Archibald Orr-Ewing, 4th Baronet
- General Sir George Osborn, 4th Baronet (1742–1818)
- Lieutenant-General Edmund Osborne
- General Sir John Oswald
- Major-General Marshall St John Oswald
- General Sir Loftus William Otway
- Lieutenant-General Sir Sir James Outram, 1st Baronet
- Brigadier-General Charles Samuel Owen
- Major-General Sir John Owen of Orielton, Baronet
- Brigadier Michael Owen
- Brigadier-General Reginald Stewart Oxley
- Major-General Walter Hayes Oxley (1891–1978)
- Major-General William Ozanne

== P ==
- Major-General Sir Denis Pack
- Major-General Simon Pack
- Lieutenant-General Sir Douglas Packard
- Major-General Charles Edward Page CB MBE, Royal Corps of Signals Colonel Commandment
- Lieutenant-General Jacko Page
- Major-General John Page
- Brigadier Malcolm Page
- Major-General Sir Max Page
- General Sir Arthur Paget
- General Sir Bernard Paget
- General The Hon. Sir Edward Paget
- General Lord George Paget
- Brigadier-General Thomas Paget
- Lieutenant-General Sir Rollo Pain
- Brigadier-General Sir William Pain
- Brigadier-General Arnaud Clarke Painter
- Brigadier-General Gordon Whistler Arnaud Painter (1893–1960), 22nd Indian Infantry Brigade CO
- Brigadier John Lannoy Arnaud Painter
- Major-General Sir Edward Pakenham
- Lieutenant-General Sir Hercules Robert Pakenham
- Lieutenant-General Thomas Pakenham
- Major-General Ridley Pakenham-Walsh
- Brigadier-General Alan Thomas Paley
- Major-General Sir Victor Paley
- Major-General Sir Philip Palin
- Major-General Charles Henry Palliser
- Major-General Henry Palliser
- Lieutenant-General Anthony Palmer
- General Sir Arthur Power Palmer
- Brigadier-General Cyril Eustace Palmer
- Major-General Geoffrey Woodroffe Palmer
- Brigadier-General George Palmer
- Major-General Henry Spencer Palmer
- Major-General Sir Michael Palmer
- General Sir Charles Patrick Ralph Palmer KCVO KBE (1933–1999), Allied Forces Northern Europe Commander-in-chief
- Lieutenant-General Sir Roger Palmer, 5th Baronet
- Major-General Tony Brian Palmer CB, Royal Electrical and Mechanical Engineers
- Brigadier-General Alphonse Eugene Panet CMG DSO, Royal Engineers
- Major-General John David Graham Pank CB, light infantry colonel
- General William Maule, 1st Earl Panmure
- Major-General Robert Beverley Pargiter
- Major-General Sir Archibald Paris
- Brigadier Archibald Paris
- Major-General Henry Woodbine Parish
- General Thomas Parke
- Surgeon General Thomas Heazle Parke
- General Sir William Parke
- Brigadier Christopher John Raymond Parker
- Lieutenant-General the Honourable George Lane Parker
- General Gervais Parker
- Brigadier James William Parker OBE, light infantry
- Major-General John Boteler Parker
- General Sir Nick Parker
- Brigadier-General St. John William Topp Parker
- Brigadier Andrew Parker Bowles
- Brigadier Charles David Parkinson ( —2021), Royal Army Dental Corps
- Major-General Sir Henry Hallam Parr
- Major-General Sir Arthur Parsons
- Major-General Sir Harold Parsons
- General Sir Robert Pascoe
- General Sir Charles Pasley
- Major-General Joseph Montagu Sabine Pasley
- Brigadier Michael John Paterson CBE, Army Catering Corps
- Major-General Douglas Stuart Paton
- Major-General Arthur Patterson
- Major-General John Robert Patterson
- General Sir George William Paty
- Lieutenant-General Lord Frederick Paulet
- Field Marshal Lord William Paulet
- Brigadier Andrew James Paviour
- Brigadier Hanbury Pawle
- Major-General George Payne
- General Sir William Payne-Gallwey, 1st Baronet
- Brigadier Robert Peake
- Brigadier Roger Peake
- Lieutenant-General Edward Pearce
- Lieutenant-General Thomas Pearce
- Brigadier-General Charles William Pearless CMG DSO (1872–1940), South Wales Borderers
- General Sir Alfred Astley Pearson
- Lieutenant-General Sir Charles Pearson
- Brigadier Hugh Guy Astley Pearson
- Major-General Ronald Matthew Pearson CB MBE QHDS, Royal Army Dental Corps
- Lieutenant-General Peter Pearson
- Lieutenant-General Sir Thomas Pearson
- General Sir Thomas Pearson
- Brigadier Arthur George Peart OBE, Royal Engineers
- Major-General Arthur Wharton Peck
- Major-General Richard Peck
- Brigadier-General Edward John Russell Peel
- Lieutenant-General Jonathan Peel
- Lieutenant-General Sir David Peel Yates
- Brigadier-General Henry Pelham Burn DSO, Gordon Highlanders
- Lieutenant-General Sir Lewis Pelly
- Brigadier-General Raymond Theodore Pelly
- General George Herbert, 11th Earl of Pembroke
- Lieutenant-General Henry Herbert, 9th Earl of Pembroke
- Lieutenant-General Henry Herbert, 10th Earl of Pembroke
- Major-General Bernard Penfold
- Major-General David Pennefather
- General Sir John Pennefather
- Major-General Sir Ronald Penney
- Major-General Brian Pennicott
- Brigadier-General John Pennycuick
- Major-General Peter Pentreath
- Lieutenant-General William Pepperrell
- Brigadier Anthony Hilton Pepys
- Major-General Christopher Peter Westby Perceval DSO (1890— ), Royal Field Artillery
- Brigadier-General Claude John Perceval
- Major-General Sir Edward Perceval
- General John Maxwell Perceval CB (c. 1814–1900)
- Lieutenant-General Arthur Percival
- Major-General Lewis Percival
- General Lord Henry Percy
- Major-General Sir Jocelyn Percy
- Major-General Sir Cecil Pereira
- Brigadier-General George Pereira
- General Sir Æneas Perkins KCB (1834–1901), British Indian Army, Royal Engineers Colonel Commandant
- Major-General Ken Perkins
- Brigadier Michael John Perkins CBE, Royal Artillery
- Major-General Sir Thomas Perrott
- Brigadier Reginald Barry Lovaine Persse
- Brigadier Sydney Henry Persse (1897–1945), Indian Armoured Corps
- Major-General Claude Ernest Pert
- Brigadier Arthur Francis Gore Pery-Knox-Gore
- Brigadier George William Howard Peters
- Brigadier Sir Christopher Peto, 3rd Baronet
- Major-General Roderic Petre
- Major-General Raymond Austin Pett CB MBE DL, King's Own Royal Border Regiment, Queen's Lancashire Regiment
- General Sir William Peyton
- Lieutenant-General Sir Arthur Purves Phayre
- General Sir Robert Phayre
- Major-General Leonard Thomas Herbert Phelps
- Brigadier-General Lewis Francis Philips CMG CBE DSO, King's Royal Rifle Corps, 128th (Hampshire) Infantry Brigade Commander
- Major-General Sir Ivor Philipps
- General Richard Philipps (1661–1750), 40th Regiment of Foot
- Major-General Sir Edward Phillips KBE CB DSO MC (1889–1973), 106th Field Ambulance, 10th Indian Infantry Division, XIII Corps Medical Services Deputy Director, 18th Army Group Medical Services Deputy Director
- Major-General Charles George Phillips MC (1889–1982)
- Brigadier-General George Fraser Phillips
- Brigadier-General Herbert de Touffreville Phillips
- Major-General Sir Leslie Gordon Phillips
- Major-General William Phillips
- Brigadier-General Louis Murray Phillpotts
- General the Honourable Edmund Phipps
- Major-General Jeremy Phipps
- Brigadier-General Edmund Phipps-Hornby
- Brigadier Harold Ernest Pickering
- Brigadier Patrick John Tottenham Pickthall
- Lieutenant-General Sir Thomas Picton
- Brigadier Matthew Fraser Pierson CB, Royal Marines
- General Sir Henry Pigot
- Lieutenant-General Sir Robert Pigot, 2nd Baronet
- Major-General Sir Robert Pigot, 7th Baronet
- Lieutenant-General Sir Anthony Pigott
- Brigadier the Honourable Dame Mary Pihl
- Brigadier Christopher Pike
- Lieutenant-General Sir Hew Pike
- Major-General Thomas Pilcher
- General Sir Frederick Alfred Pile
- Lieutenant-General Sir Andrew Pilkington
- Brigadier Harold Senhouse Pinder
- Major-General Henry Pipon
- Air Commodore (previously Brigadier-General) Duncan Pitcher
- General Sir William Augustus Pitt
- Lieutenant-General Augustus Pitt Rivers
- General Sir Walter Pitt-Taylor
- General Alfred Fox Place (c. 1815–1902), Madras Army
- Major-General Freddie Plaskett
- Brigadier James Ian Stuart Plastow
- General Sir William Platt
- Major-General Ian Stanley Ord Playfair
- Field Marshal Herbert Plumer, 1st Viscount Plumer
- Major-General Brian Peter Plummer
- Brigadier Leo Heathcote Plummer CBE, 1st Artillery Brigade, Royal Artillery
- Brigadier-General John Pocock
- General Sir Nigel Poett
- Lieutenant-General Sir Mark Poffley
- Lieutenant-General Sir Reginald Pole-Carew
- Major-General Anthony Pollard
- Major-General Charles Barry Pollard
- Major-General Sir Frederick Richard Pollock
- Field Marshal Sir George Pollock
- Major-General Robert Pollok CB CBE DSO (1884–1979), 15th The King's Hussars, Irish Guards
- Brigadier-General John Buchanan Pollok-McCall
- Brigadier Nicholas Stephen Pond OBE, Royal Artillery
- Major-General the Honourable Sir Frederick Ponsonby
- Major-General Sir Henry Ponsonby
- Major-General the Honourable Henry Ponsonby
- Major-General Sir John Ponsonby
- Major-General the Honourable Sir William Ponsonby
- Brigadier David More Pontifex
- Major-General Sir Frederick Poole
- Lieutenant-General Sir Nick Pope
- Brigadier Philip William Gladstone Pope
- Major-General Sydney B. Pope
- Lieutenant-General Vyvyan Pope
- Major-General Christopher John Popham CB (1927–2005), Royal Engineers
- Brigadier Robert Home Stewart Popham
- Brigadier-General Sir Bertram Percy Portal
- Brigadier David J Porter
- General David Colyear, 1st Earl of Portmore
- Brigadier Arthur Kingscote Potter (1905–1998)
- Brigadier-General Herbert Cecil Potter
- Major-General Sir John Potter
- Lieutenant-General Sir Henry Pottinger, Bart.
- Brigadier Alex Potts
- Lieutenant-General the Honourable Vere Poulett
- Major-General Henry Boileau Adolphus Poulton ( —1902), Bengal Staff Corps
- Major-General Edgar George Derek Pounds CB (1922–2002), Royal Marines
- Brigadier Mark Nicholas Pountain
- General Henry Watson Powell
- Brigadier Enoch Powell
- Lieutenant-General Sir Manley Power
- Major-General Sir Charles Armand Powlett
- Brigadier Frank Hugh Swanwick Pownall
- Lieutenant-General Sir Henry Pownall
- Brigadier Oliver Gartside Pratt MBE
- General Sir Thomas Simson Pratt
- General Sir Harry Prendergast
- General Sir Jeffrey Prendergast
- Brigadier John Prendergast
- Brigadier-General Sir Thomas Prendergast, 1st Baronet
- Brigadier-General Robert Emile Shepherd Prentice
- Lieutenant-General Richard Prescott
- General Robert Prescott
- Brigadier-General Cyril Prescott-Decie DSO, Royal Artillery
- Lieutenant-General George Preston
- Brigadier Roger St Clair Preston
- Major-General Sir George Pretyman
- Major-General Augustine Prevost
- Lieutenant-General Sir George Prevost
- Brigadier-General Bartholomew George Price
- Brigadier-General George Dominic Price
- Brigadier Christopher Keith Price CBE, 14th/20th King's Hussars
- Major-General Davis Price
- Major-General John Price
- Major-General Maurice David Price CB OBE, Royal Corps of Signals Colonel Commandment
- Brigadier Reginald George Price (1897–1981), Royal Artillery, 34th Infantry Division
- Brigadier-General Thomas Herbert Francis Price
- Major-General Llewelyn Price-Davies VC, CB, CMG, DSO
- Brigadier-General John Prideaux
- General James Maurice Primrose
- Major-General Hugh Anthony Prince
- Major-General Andrew Pringle
- Lieutenant-General Sir Steuart Pringle, Bart.
- Lieutenant-General Sir William Henry Pringle
- Major-General George Prior-Palmer
- Brigadier Sir Otho Prior-Palmer
- Major-General Harry Pritchard
- Brigadier Michael Barry Pritchard CBE ADC, Queen's Own Hussars
- General Sir Dighton Probyn
- Major-General Henry Procter
- General Sir Henry ap Rhys Pryce KCB CMG DSO (1874–1950)
- Major-General William John "Bill" Pryn OBE , Royal Army Medical Corps
- Major-General Michael Whitworth Prynne
- Major-General Lewis Pugh
- Brigadier Neville Maurice Pughe
- General Sir James Pulteney, 7th Baronet
- General Harry Pulteney
- Lieutenant-General Sir William Pulteney
- Major-General Corran Purdon
- Brigadier Robert William Hunt Purdy
- Brigadier Richard Brownlow Purey-Cust
- Brigadier Hugh William Kellow Pye (1938–2024), 12th Royal Lancers, 9th/12th Royal Lancers
- Brigadier Randall Thomas Kellow Pye
- General Charles Pye-Douglas (c. 1767–1844), 3rd The King's Own Hussars
- General Sir Harold Pyman

== Q ==
- Major-General Thomas David Graham Quayle CB, Royal Artillery
- General Sir Edward Quinan

== R ==
- Brigadier Basil Bedsmore Rackham
- Brigadier-General Frederick Walter Radcliffe
- General Sir Percy Radcliffe
- General Sir Tim Radford
- Major-General Sir Digby Raeburn
- Brigadier Peter Rafferty, Duke of Lancaster's Regiment, King's Regiment
- Field Marshal FitzRoy Somerset, 1st Baron Raglan
- General Robert Napier Raikes
- Major-General Sir Geoffrey Raikes
- Major-General Bertram George Ralfs
- Major-General Charles Ramsay
- Major-General Frank William Ramsay
- General the Hon. Sir Henry Ramsay
- Lieutenant-General the Hon. John Ramsay
- General David Ramsbotham, Baron Ramsbotham
- Major-General William Havelock Ramsden
- Brigadier Gael Kathleen Ramsey
- Major-General Sir Hubert Rance
- Brigadier John Pomeroy Randle OBE MC (1921–2021), Devonshire and Dorset Regiment
- Major-General John Brocklehurst, 1st Baron Ranksborough
- Major-General Robert St. George Tyldesley Ransome
- Major-General Tony Raper
- Brigadier Roy Elliot Ratazzi
- Major-General Hurdis Ravenshaw
- Brigadier James Maudesley Rawcliffe
- Brigadier-General Cecil Rawling
- General Henry Rawlinson, 1st Baron Rawlinson
- Brigadier-General Michael Richard Raworth, 7th Parachute Regiment Royal Horse Artillery
- Major-General Geoffrey Rawson
- General Sir Antony Read
- Brigadier Gregory Read CBE (c. 1935–2014), Royal Tank Regiment
- Lieutenant-General Sir John Read
- Major-General Raymond Northland Revell Reade
- Major-General Arnold Reading
- General Sir Felix Ready
- Major-General John Ready
- Lieutenant-General Sir Alan Reay
- Major-General Joseph Reay (c. 1829–1902), Bengal Staff Corps
- General Francis Slater Rebow
- Major-General Sir Roy Redgrave
- Major-General Denis Redman
- Lieutenant-General Sir Harold Redman
- Lieutenant-General John Patrick Redmond CB (1824–1902)
- Major-General Hamilton Reed VC
- Brigadier-General Hubert Conway Rees
- Major-General Thomas Wynford Rees
- Brigadier John Joseph Regan
- Major-General Michael Regan
- Major-General A. T. Reid, CB, Bombay Staff Corps
- Major-General Alexander Thomson Reid (c1840–1903), Bombay Staff Corps, son of previous
- General Sir Charles Reid
- Major-General Denys Whitehorn Reid
- General John Reid
- Major-General Peter Daer Reid CB (1925–2020), Royal Horse Guards and 1st Dragoons
- Major-General Sir William Reid
- Lieutenant-General Sir Jeremy Reilly
- Major-General William Edward Moyses Reilly
- General Sir John Reith
- Brigadier Dennis Bossey Rendell
- Major-General Francis Rodd, 2nd Baron Rennell
- Brigadier-General George Arthur Patrick Rennie DSO, King's Royal Rifle Corps
- Major-General Tom Rennie
- Major-General George Alexander Renny
- General Henry Renny
- Brigadier-General Lewis Frederick Renny
- Major-General James Renton
- Major-General William Revell Revell-Smith CB CBE DSO MC AM,
- Lieutenant-General Sir Thomas Reynell, 6th Baronet
- Major-General Jack Raymond Reynolds CB OBE ERD, Royal Army Service Corps
- Major-General Michael Frank Reynolds CB, Queen's Regiment
- Brigadier Robin Rhoderick-Jones
- General Sir Phineas Riall
- Brigadier-General Cecil Edward Rice DSO, Royal Fusiliers
- Major-General Sir Desmond Rice
- Gerard Beechey Howard Rice
- Major-General Sir Spring R. Rice
- Lieutenant-General George Whitworth Talbot Rich CB (c. 1822–1902), British Indian Army
- Field Marshal Sir Robert Rich, 4th Baronet
- Lieutenant-General Sir Robert Rich, 5th Baronet
- General The Lord Richards of Herstmonceux
- Lieutenant-General Sir John Richards
- Brigadier-General Michael Richards
- Major-General Sir Nigel Richards
- General Sir Charles Leslie Richardson
- Lieutenant-General Sir Robert Richardson
- Major-General Tony Richardson
- Major-General Edward Richbell
- General Sir Ian Riches
- Lieutenant-General Charles Lennox, 2nd Duke of Richmond
- Field Marshal Charles Lennox, 3rd Duke of Richmond
- Lieutenant-General Charles Lennox, 4th Duke of Richmond
- Brigadier John Francis Rickett CBE, Welsh Guards
- Major-General Abdy Ricketts
- Major-General Charles James Buchanan Riddell, CB (1817–1903), Royal Artillery
- General Henry Riddell
- Brigadier-General James Foster Riddell
- Major-General William Riddell CB (1805–1875)
- Major-General Michael Riddell-Webster
- General Sir Thomas Riddell-Webster
- Lieutenant-General John Wood Rideout, Indian Army
- Brigadier John Ridge
- Major-General Susan Ridge
- Lieutenant-General Sir Andrew Ridgway
- Brigadier Noel Thomas Anthony Ridings CBE, Royal Pioneer Corps
- Major-General Charles William Ridley
- Major-General Sir Dudley Ridout
- Brigadier John Rigby
- Lieutenant-General Jonathon Riley
- Lieutenant-General Samuel Rimington
- Major-General Gordon Risius
- Brigadier Alan MacDougall Ritchie
- Major-General Andrew Ritchie
- Major-General Sir Archibald Ritchie
- Brigadier Charles David Maciver Ritchie MBE, Royal Scots
- General Sir Neil Ritchie
- General Richard Savage, 4th Earl Rivers
- Major-General Sir Frederick Robb
- Major-General William Robb
- Major-General Frederick Robe
- General Sir Abraham Roberts
- Brigadier-General Arthur Roberts
- Brigadier Frank Roberts
- Major-General Frank Crowther Roberts
- Field Marshal Frederick Roberts, 1st Earl Roberts
- Brigadier Michael Rookherst Roberts
- General Sir Ouvry Lindfield Roberts
- Major-General Philip Roberts
- Major-General Sir Sebastian Roberts
- General Alexander Cunningham Robertson
- Brigadier Angus Francis Fletcher Hope Robertson CBE ( —2012), Royal Anglian Regiment
- General Brian Robertson, 1st Baron Robertson of Oakridge
- Major-General Ian Argyll Robertson
- Brigadier Iain Gregory Robertson OBE TD DL CStJ, Royal Army Medical Corps
- Major-General James Howden Robertson CB , Queen's Honorary Dental Surgeon, Royal Army Dental Corps
- General William Robertson of Lude ( —1820), Perthshire Fencibles
- Field Marshal Sir William Robertson, 1st Baronet GCB GCVO DSO (1860–1933), Chief of the Imperial General Staff
- Major-General William John Pherrick Robins CB OBE, Royal Corps of Signals
- Major-General Alfred Robinson
- General Sir Frederick Philipse Robinson
- Major-General Tim Robinson
- Brigadier Tom Robinson
- Major General Garry Robison
- Lieutenant-General George Brydges Rodney
- Major General Andrew Roe
- Major-General William Gordon Roe
- Major-General Robert Montresor Rogers
- Brigadier Thomas Leslie Rogers
- General Henry Robinson-Montagu, 6th Baron Rokeby
- Brigadier-General Andrew Rollo, 5th Lord Rollo
- Lieutenant-General Sir Bill Rollo
- Major-General Hamish Rollo
- Brigadier-General Stuart Peter Rolt
- Major-General Francis Rome
- General Sir Cecil Romer
- Brigadier Richard Rook
- Brigadier Vera Margaret Rooke CB CBE RRC QHNS, Queen Alexandra's Royal Army Nursing Corps
- Major-General Sir Horace Roome
- Major-General Oliver Roome
- Major-General Henry Roper
- Brigadier Ian Martin Rose
- Major-General John Gordon Rose
- Brigadier-General John Latham Rose
- General Sir Michael Rose
- Brigadier Alan Ross
- General Alexander Ross
- General Sir Campbell Claye Grant Ross
- General Charles Ross
- Brigadier David Ross CBE
- Field Marshal Sir Hew Dalrymple Ross
- General Ralph Gore, 1st Earl of Ross
- Major-General Robert Ross
- Major-General Robert Knox Ross
- Lieutenant-General Sir Robin Ross
- Brigadier-General Sir Walter Charteris Ross
- General James St Clair-Erskine, 2nd Earl of Rosslyn
- General Robert Cuninghame, 1st Baron Rossmore
- Brigadier Richard Campbell Rothery OBE, Royal Irish Rangers
- General John Leslie, 10th Earl of Rothes
- Major-General Francis de Rottenburg
- Major-General Charles Jeremy Rougier CB, Royal Engineers
- Brigadier-General Edward Murray Colston, 2nd Baron Roundway
- Brigadier George Roupell VC CB DL
- Lieutenant-General the Honourable Sir William Rous
- Major-General Jeremy Rowan
- Field Marshal Sir William Rowan
- Brigadier Gawaine Basil Rowan-Hamilton DSO MC (1884–1947), Commanding Officer, Fife Sub-Area
- Major-General Sir Eric Bertram Rowcroft
- Major-General Peter Rowell
- General Sir Hugh Rowlands
- Major-General William Roy
- Brigadier Michael John Roycroft
- Brigadier-General William Charles Eric Rudkin
- Major-General Sir Harold Goodeve Ruggles-Brise
- General Sir Leslie Rundle
- General Lord Alexander Russell
- Brigadier-General the Honourable Alexander Victor Frederick Villiers Russell
- General Sir Baker Russell
- Brigadier Bruce Russell
- General Sir David Russell
- Lieutenant-General Sir Dudley Russell
- Major-General Francis Russell
- Major-General Lord George Russell
- Brigadier Gerald David John Robert Russell
- Brigadier Hugh Edward Russell
- Major-General John Cecil Russell
- Brigadier Valentine Cubitt Russell
- Major General John Russell-Jones
- Major-General David Rutherford-Jones
- Major-General Walter Hore-Ruthven, 10th Lord Ruthven of Freeland
- Major-General Martin Rutledge
- Brigadier John Bleaden Ryall
- Major-General Denis Edgar Ryan CB, Royal Army Educational Corps
- Brigadier J.S. Ryder
- Brigadier-General William Henry Ryves

== S ==
- General Sir Edward Sabine
- General Joseph Sabine
- Major-General Charles Sackville-West, 4th Baron Sackville
- Lieutenant-General George Germain, 1st Viscount Sackville
- Brigadier-General Lionel Sadleir-Jackson
- Brigadier Geoffrey Chartres Safford CBE, Royal Artillery
- General the Honourable James St. Clair
- Major-General Thomas Staunton St. Clair
- Major-General Sir Peter St. Clair-Ford
- General Sir John St. George
- Major-General Roger Ellis Tudor St. John
- Major-General Anthony St. Leger
- Brigadier-General John Townshend St Aubyn, 2nd Baron St Levan
- Major-General Sir Robert Henry Sale
- Major-General Sir Guy Salisbury-Jones
- Brigadier William Baines Sallitt
- Brigadier Henry Lionel Broome Salmon
- Major-General Harold Francis Salt
- Lieutenant-General Alexander Fraser, 17th Lord Saltoun
- Brigadier Alexander Fraser, 19th Lord Saltoun
- Brigadier Thomas Sampson CBE, Army Catering Corps
- Brigadier Francis Wyld Sandars
- Brigadier-General Arthur Richard Careless Sanders
- General Sir Patrick Sanders
- Brigadier Philip Sanders
- Brigadier Barry Joseph Sanderson
- Brigadier Daniel Sandford
- General William Mansfield, 1st Baron Sandhurst
- Brigadier John Grey Sandie, (1897–1975)
- Brigadier Harold Richard Sandilands DSO (1876–1961), Royal Northumberland Fusiliers
- Major-General James Walter Sandilands
- Lieutenant-General Arthur Hill, 2nd Baron Sandys
- Lieutenant-General Sir Richard Hieram Sankey
- Lieutenant-General Henry Sarel
- Lieutenant-General John Neptune Sargent
- Major-General Euston Henry Sartorius
- Major-General Reginald William Sartorius
- General Sir Thomas Saumarez
- Major-General Kenneth Saunders
- Major-General Sir John Boscawen Savage
- Brigadier-General Walter Clare Savile CB DSO (1857–1928)
- Lieutenant-General Sir Reginald Savory
- Major-General Michael Saward
- Major-General James Maxwell Sawers CB MBE, Royal Corps of Signals
- Field Marshal Prince Edward of Saxe-Weimar
- Major-General Thomas Twisleton, 13th Baron Saye and Sele
- Lieutenant-General Sir James Sayer
- Lieutenant-General Sir Robert Scallon
- Major-General Aldred Lumley, 10th Earl of Scarbrough
- Lieutenant-General Richard Lumley, 2nd Earl of Scarbrough
- Major-General Roger Lumley, 11th Earl of Scarbrough
- General Sir James Yorke Scarlett
- Major-General the Honourable Percy Scarlett
- Brigadier-General George Adinston McLaren Sceales
- Major-General Henry Schaw, CB (1829–1902), Royal Engineers
- General Meinhardt Schomberg, 3rd Duke of Schomberg
- Brigadier-General Acton Lemuel Schreiber
- Lieutenant-General Sir Edmond Schreiber
- General Sir Henry Sclater
- Major-General Sir Harry Scobell
- Major-General Sir John Scobell
- Lieutenant-General Sir Ronald Scobie
- General Sir Geoffry Scoones
- Major-General Sir Robert Scot
- Major-General Edward William Smythe Scott
- Major-General Sir Francis Cunningham Scott
- Brigadier Henry St George Stewart Scott
- General Sir Hopetoun Stratford Scott
- Major-General James Bruce Scott
- Brigadier John M Scott (1887–1971)
- Major-General Michael Scott
- Major-General Robert Scott CB FRCS (1929–1991), Royal Army Medical Corps
- Major-General Thomas Scott CB (1897–1968), British Indian Army
- Major-General Thomas Scott
- Major-General William Arthur Scott
- Lieutenant-General Sir David Scott-Barrett
- Major-General Logan Scott-Bowden
- Major-General James Scott-Elliot
- General Sir William Scotter
- Brigadier-General Robert Scott-Kerr
- Major-General Sir George Kenneth Scott-Moncrieff
- General Sir George Scovell
- Lieutenant-General Francis Mackenzie, 1st Baron Seaforth
- Lieutenant-General Edward Seager
- Major-General Robin Searby
- Brigadier Albert Alexander Seaton CBE, Royal Engineers
- Field Marshal John Colborne, 1st Baron Seaton
- General Sir John Sebright, 6th Baronet
- Brigadier-General Hugh Sempill, 12th Lord Sempill
- Lieutenant-General Sir Bertram Sergison-Brooke
- Lieutenant-General Sir Henry Hamilton Settle
- Brigadier-General Horace Sewell
- General Sir William Henry Sewell
- Major-General Francis Michael Sexton CB OBE, Royal Engineers
- General Sir Francis Seymour, 1st Baronet
- Lieutenant-General William Seymour
- Brigadier Edward Roy Shaddock
- Major-General Charles Maxton Shakespear (1816–1903), Madrass Staff Corps
- Field Marshal Richard Boyle, 2nd Viscount Shannon
- Major-General Peter Shapland
- Brigadier Ian Richard Duff Shapter OBE DL
- Brigadier John Sharland
- Major-General Alan George Sharman CBE, Defence Manufacturers' Association Director General
- General Sir John Sharp
- Major General Andrew Richard Darwen Sharpe
- Major-General Anthony Shaw
- Brigadier Arnold Shaw DSO
- Major-General David Shaw
- Brigadier David C.N. Shaw
- Major-General Dennis Shaw CB CBE, Commando Logistic Regiment
- Lieutenant-General Sir Frederick Shaw
- Major-General Hugh Shaw VC
- Major-General James Michael Shaw
- Major-General Jonathan Shaw
- General Sir James Shaw Kennedy
- Major-General John Heron Maxwell Shaw-Stewart
- General Sir John Shea
- General Sir Roger Hale Sheaffe
- Major-General Philip James Shears
- Brigadier Michael Sheehan CBE (1899–1975)
- Brigadier Maurice John Sheen CBE TD QVRM, Royal Logistic Corps
- Major-General Michael Francis Linton Shellard CBE, Royal Artillery
- Brigadier-General Gordon Strachey Shephard
- Major-General Joseph Kenneth Shepheard
- Brigadier Gilbert John Victor Shepherd DSO (1887–1969), Royal Engineers
- Brigadier-General H.C. Sheppard
- Major-General Peter John Sheppard CB CBE, Royal Engineers
- Major-General Seymour Hulbert Sheppard
- Brigadier William Paine Sheppard CBE MC TD DL, Yorkshire Volunteers
- General Sir John Coape Sherbrooke
- Major-General Sir George Moyle Sherer
- Brigadier Stephen Frederick Sherry CMG OBE, Royal Engineers
- Brigadier John Sherwood-Kelly, VC
- Brigadier Henry Anthony Lampen Shewell
- Brigadier Robert John Shields CBE, Royal Electrical and Mechanical Engineers
- General Sir Horatio Shirley (1805–1879)
- Lieutenant-General William Shirley
- General Sir Richard Shirreff
- Major-General Stephen Shoosmith
- Major-General James Henderson Terry Short (1950–2022), Colonel of the 9th/12th Royal Lancers
- Brigadier Michael John Short CBE ADC, Royal Army Ordnance Corps
- Brigadier Sir Noel Edward Vivian Short MBE MC, Secretary to the Speaker, House of Commons
- Major-General William Robert "Robin" Short CB (1942–2023), Royal Army Medical Corps
- Major-General Colin Shortis
- Major-General Arthur Shortt
- Major-General Herbert Shoubridge
- Lieutenant-General Henry Shrapnel
- Major-General John Shrimpton
- General Sir Cameron Shute
- General Sir Charles Cameron Shute
- Brigadier A. R. B. Shuttleworth
- Major-General Peter Sibbald
- Major-General Herbert Taylor Siborne (1826–1902), Royal Engineers
- Brigadier Ronald George Silk CBE DL (c. 1942–2020), Worcestershire and Sherwood Foresters Regiment colonel
- Lieutenant-General Duncan Sim (c1790–1865)
- Brigadier Ian Angus Sim CBE TD ADC, 51st Highland Volunteers
- Lieutenant-General John Graves Simcoe
- Brigadier Alan John Simmons (1930–2020)
- Major-General Frank Keith Simmons
- Field Marshal Sir Lintorn Simmons
- Brigadier Richard Simpkin
- General Sir Frank Simpson
- General Sir James Simpson
- Brigadier John Simpson
- Major-General Sir John Sinclair
- Major-General George Brian Sinclair
- Lieutenant-General Patrick Sinclair
- Major-General Ewen Sinclair-MacLagan
- Lieutenant-General Sir Pratap Singh of Idar
- Major-General Martin Henry Sinnatt CB (1928–2022), Director of Combat Development, late Royal Tank Regiment
- Brigadier Arthur Alexander Sisson
- Lieutenant General Stuart Skeates
- General Sir Andrew Skeen
- Lieutenant-General Robert Skene (1719–1787)
- Major-General Keith Skempton
- Major-General Bruce Skinner
- Major-General Michael Timothy Skinner KCB, Royal Artillery
- Major-General Sir Percy Cyriac Burrell Skinner
- General Sir John Slade, 1st Baronet
- Major-General Sir John Ramsay Slade
- Brigadier-General Gerald Carew Sladen
- Major-General Rudolf Carl von Slatin
- General Sir James Wallace Sleigh
- Field Marshal William Slim, 1st Viscount Slim
- Lieutenant-General Sir Arthur Sloggett
- Brigadier-General Henry Stanhope Sloman
- General Sir Robert Sloper
- Major-General John Small
- Major-General Gerald Smallwood
- Brigadier John Smedley
- Lieutenant-General Sir Arthur Smith
- Brigadier-General Clement Leslie Smith
- Brigadier Etienne Lionel Heriz Smith
- Major-General Francis Smith
- Major-General Frederick Henry Smith (died 1903), Bengal Staff Corps
- Major-General Sir Frederick Smith
- Major-General Greg Smith
- Lieutenant-General Sir Harry Smith, 1st Baronet
- General Sir Lionel Smith, 1st Baronet
- Major-General Martin Smith
- Lieutenant-General Philip Smith
- Brigadier Richard Ross Smith
- General Sir Rupert Smith
- Major-General Sir William Douglas Smith
- General Sir Horace Smith-Dorrien
- Brigadier Peter Lockwood Smith-Dorrien (1907–1946)
- General Sir Edward Selby Smyth
- Major-General George Stracey Smyth
- General Henry Augustus Smyth
- Brigadier Sir John Smyth, 1st Baronet, acting Major-General
- Lieutenant-General the Honourable Sir Leicester Smyth
- Major-General Sir Nevill Maskelyne Smyth
- Brigadier Thomas Stuart Sneyd
- Lieutenant-General Sir Thomas Snow
- Brigadier Edward Joseph Dove Snowball O.B.E. (1913–1987), Argyll and Sutherland Highlanders
- Brigadier-General George Joseph Fitzmaurice Soady CMG, British Indian Army
- General Algernon Seymour, 7th Duke of Somerset
- General Lord Edward Somerset
- Lieutenant-General Edward Arthur Somerset
- Lieutenant-General Henry Somerset
- Brigadier the Honourable Nigel FitzRoy Somerset
- Lieutenant-General Henry Somerset
- Brigadier Desmond Henry Sykes Somerville
- Brigadier Sir John Nicholas Somerville CBE, infantry
- Major-General Ronald Macaulay Somerville OBE, Royal Artillery
- Major-General David William Southall CBE
- General Charles FitzRoy, 1st Baron Southampton
- Lieutenant-General George Ferdinand FitzRoy, 2nd Baron Southampton
- Major-General Keith Spacie CB OBE (1935–2022), Director of Army Training, Parachute Regiment
- Brigadier John William Charles Spackman
- Major-General Sir Edward Spears
- Brigadier-General Cecil Herbert Speer OBE (1892–1956), British Indian Army
- Brigadier-General Nigel Ian Bartlett Speller MBE, Royal Corps of Transport
- Major-General Norman Henry Speller
- Brigadier Ian Fleming Morris Spence (c.1906—1966)
- General the Honourable Sir Augustus Spencer
- General Sir Brent Spencer
- Brigadier Richard Anthony Winchcombe Spencer CBE, Royal Marines
- Major-General Richard John Bemrose Spencer
- Major-General Jeremy Spencer-Smith
- Major-General Edgar John Spilsbury (1827–1903), Bengal Staff Corps.
- General Sir John Spink
- Major-General Sir Charlton Spinks
- Brigadier John Spottiswoode
- Brigadier-General Frederick Spring
- Brigadier Edmund Philip Osborn Springfield CBE, Intelligence Corps
- Lieutenant-General John Sprot, Argyll and Sutherland Highlanders colonel
- Lieutenant-General William Spry
- Major-General Peter Lester Spurgeon CB (1927–2014), Royal Marines
- Lieutenant-General Sir John Blick Spurgin
- Brigadier John Roger Spurry CBE, Royal Army Veterinary Corps
- Major-General Sir Lee Stack
- Brigadier-General William Stafford
- Major-General Charles Stainforth
- Field Marshal John Dalrymple, 2nd Earl of Stair
- General John Dalrymple, 8th Earl of Stair
- Major-General Samuel Stallard (c. 1824–1902), Bengal Artillery
- Brigadier-General Stacey Frampton Stallard, Royal Artillery
- Major General Richard Stanford
- Major-General James Stanhope, 1st Earl Stanhope
- Brigadier Sir Alexander Beville Gibbons Stanier, 2nd Baronet
- Field Marshal Sir John Stanier
- Brigadier Anthony Graham Staniforth CBE, Corps of Royal Electrical and Mechanical Engineers
- Brigadier-General Henry Calvert Stanley-Clarke
- Brigadier-General Thomas Wolryche Stansfeld
- General Sir Edward Stanton
- Lieutenant-General John Stanwix
- Brigadier-General Thomas Stanwix
- Lieutenant-General William Stapleton
- Brigadier John Geoffrey Starling CBE MC ADC, Parachute Regiment
- General Sir Charles William Dunbar Staveley
- Brigadier Robert Staveley (1892–1968)
- Lieutenant-General William Staveley
- General Sir Edward Stedman
- Brigadier Charles Steel
- Major-General James Anthony Steel (c. 1825–1902), Bengal Staff Corps, Honorary Major-General
- Lieutenant-General Sir Scudamore Winde Steel
- General Sir James Steele
- Brigadier-General Julian Steele
- General Sir Thomas Steele
- Brigadier William Lindsay Steele
- Major-General Christopher Michael Steirn CBE, Royal Logistic Corps
- Lieutenant General Zac Stenning
- Major-General Robert Alexander Stephen
- Major-General Keith Fielding Stephens
- Brigadier Michael Stephens
- General Sir Reginald Byng Stephens
- Major-General John Aubrey Stephenson CB OBE, 1st Artillery Brigade
- General Sir Frederick Stephenson
- Major-General Theodore Stephenson
- Brigadier Alan S. Stepto
- Major-General Arthur Stevens
- General Edmund Stevens
- Major-General Gary Roger Stevens MVO
- Brigadier-General George Archibald Stevens
- Brigadier William Barry Stevens
- Brigadier-General Alexander Gavin Stevenson, Royal Engineers
- General Nathaniel Stevenson
- Major-General Paul Timothy Stevenson
- Brigadier Peter Ian Boldero Stevenson CBE, King's Own Scottish Borderers
- Major-General Andrew Stewart
- Major-General David Stewart of Garth
- Field Marshal Sir Donald Stewart, 1st Baronet
- Major-General Sir Herbert Stewart
- Brigadier Ian MacAlister Stewart
- Lieutenant-General Sir Robert MacGregor Stewart
- Lieutenant-General Sir William Stewart
- Major-General Arthur Stewart-Cox
- Brigadier Peter Neil Ralli Stewart-Richardson
- Lieutenant-General Giles Stibbert
- General Sir John Stibbon
- Lieutenant-General Sir Charles Stickland
- Brigadier David Madryll Stileman OBE, Royal Green Jackets
- Brigadier-General Archibald Stirling
- Brigadier James Erskine Stirling
- Brigadier Walter Andrew Stirling
- General Sir William Stirling GCB CBE DSO (1907–1973), Commander-in-Chief, British Army of the Rhine
- Lieutenant-General Sir Henry William Stisted KCB (1817–1875), 78th (Highlanders) Regiment of Foot
- Major-General Reginald Booth Stockdale
- Brigadier-General Arthur Uniacke Stockley
- Brigadier-General Clifton Inglis Stockwell
- Major-General George Stockwell
- General Sir Hugh Stockwell
- Brigadier Ralph Shelton Griffin Stokes DSO MC (1882–1979), Royal Engineers
- Major-General John Douglas Stokoe CB CBE, Royal Corps of Signals
- Major-General Anthony Charles Peter Stone CB, Royal Artillery
- Brigadier John Southam Wycherley Stone
- Brigadier Michael Stone
- Major-General Patrick Phillip Dennant Stone CB CBE (1939–2022), Royal Anglian Regiment colonel, Military Provost Staff Colonel Commandant
- Lieutenant-General Robert Stone
- Major-General Philip le Marchant Stonhouse Stonhouse-Gostling Royal Regiment of Artillery
- Major-General the Honourable Edward Stopford (1732–1794)
- Lieutenant-General the Honourable Sir Edward Stopford (1766–1837)
- Lieutenant-General Sir Frederick Stopford
- Brigadier James Stopford CBE
- General Sir Montagu Stopford
- Major-General Stephen Robert Anthony Stopford CB MBE, Royal Scots Dragoon Guards
- Lieutenant-General Sir Henry Knight Storks
- Lieutenant-General Sandy Storrie
- General Sir Frederick Stovin
- Lieutenant-General Sir Richard Strachey
- Field Marshal John Byng, 1st Earl of Strafford
- Brigadier Alistair Campbell, 4th Baron Stratheden
- Field Marshal Hugh Rose, 1st Baron Strathnairn
- Lieutenant-General Sir William Stratton
- Major-General John Strawson CB OBE, Royal Armoured Corps
- Brigadier Richard John Streatfield
- Major-General Timothy Stuart Champion Streatfeild CB MBE, Royal Artillery
- Major-General Vivian Street
- Major-General John Arkwright Strick CB CBE DSO (1870–1934), King's Shropshire Light Infantry
- Major-General Gerald Strickland
- Lieutenant-General Sir Peter Strickland
- Major-General Sir Kenneth Strong
- Brigadier Humphrey Cecil Travell Stronge (1891–1977), Southern Brigade, Nigeria CO, Blackdown & Deepcut CO
- Major-General Mark Strudwick
- Lieutenant-General Sir Charles Stuart
- Major-General James Stuart ( —1793)
- General James Stuart
- Lieutenant-General Sir John Stuart, Count of Maida
- General the Honourable Sir Patrick Stuart
- Lieutenant-General the Honourable William Stuart
- Brigadier Vernon Stuart Stuart-Smith (1926–2021)
- Brigadier-General Herbert Studd
- Brigadier Malden A. Studd
- Major-General Henry Arthur John Sturge CB, Royal Corps of Signals colonel commandment
- Brigadier Nigel Richard Sturt
- Brigadier-General William Hodgson Suart
- General John Howard, 15th Earl of Suffolk
- General Sir Cecil Sugden
- Major-General Francis George Sugden CB CBE, Royal Engineers
- Major-General Timothy Sulivan
- Brigadier Percival Suther
- Major-General John Sutherell
- Major-General Hugh Sutton
- Brigadier John Sutton
- Brigadier-General Wilfred Spedding Swabey
- Major-General Sir Leopold Swaine
- Major-General John Christopher Swann
- Lieutenant-General Sir John Swayne
- Lieutenant General James Swift
- Brigadier David Henry Amyatt Swinburn
- Lieutenant-General Sir Richard Swinburn
- Major-General George Michael Geoffrey Swindells CB, 9th/12th Royal Lancers
- Major-General Sir John Swinton of Kimmerghame
- Major-General Sir Ernest Dunlop Swinton KBE CB DSO, RE - War Correspondent, armoured warfare pioneer, Colonel Commandant of the Royal Tank Corps
- Air Vice Marshal Sir Frederick Sykes
- Brigadier-General Sir Percy Sykes (1867–1945)
- Major-General Matthew Sykes
- Brigadier Paul William Symes
- Brigadier-General Adolphe Symons
- Major-General Charles Bertie Symons (1795–1880), Royal Artillery, Honorary Major-General
- Major-General Sir William Penn Symons
- Lieutenant-General Coote Synge-Hutchinson (1832–1902), 19th Hussars colonel

== T ==
- Major-General David Tabor
- General Sir Norman Tailyour
- Major-General Dennis Talbot
- Lieutenant-General Sir Norman Talbot
- Major-General Sir Reginald Talbot
- Major-General Robert Talbot Rice
- Brigadier-General John Arthur Tanner
- Major-General James John Bonifant Tapley
- Major-General Sir Nigel Tapp
- General Sir Banastre Tarleton
- Lieutenant-General William Tatton
- Major General Alex Taylor
- Lieutenant-General Sir Allan Taylor
- Brigadier Basil Anthony Bethune Taylor
- Brigadier Donald Verner Taylor
- Brigadier George Taylor
- Lieutenant-General Sir Herbert Taylor
- Brigadier John Taylor (Army Legal Corps)
- Major-General Markham Le Fer Taylor
- Brigadier Michael Gordon Taylor MBE, Royal Corps of Signals
- Major-General Reynell Taylor
- General Sir Richard Taylor
- General Robert Taylor
- Major-General Thomas William Taylor
- Francis, Duke of Teck
- Major-General Sir Christopher Teesdale
- Brigadier Charles Brockbank Telfer CBE ADC, Royal Pioneer Corps
- Major-General Alexander Telfer-Smollett
- Brigadier Edward Temple
- Brigadier Harold Beecham Temple-Richards
- Field Marshal Sir Gerald Templer
- Major-General James Robert Templer CB OBE, Royal Artillery
- Major-General Alfred Templeman
- General George Upton, 3rd Viscount Templetown
- Brigadier-General Sir James Tennant
- Major-General Michael Trenchard Tennant CB, Royal Artillery
- Brigadier Charles Russell Terrot DSO , 6th (Inniskilling) Dragoons, 5th Royal Inniskilling Dragoon Guards
- Brigadier James Noel Tetley
- Lieutenant-General Andrew Rutherford, 1st Earl of Teviot ( —1664), Garde Écossaise, Tangier Regiment
- Brigadier-General Frank Staniford Thackeray
- General Frederick Rennell Thackeray
- Brigadier Denys Thackwell
- Lieutenant-General Sir Joseph Thackwell
- Lieutenant-General the Honourable Charles Wemyss Thesiger
- Major-General George Thesiger
- Brigadier Henry John Anthony Thicknesse
- Brigadier Ralph Nevill Thicknesse
- Brigadier Brian Thomas CBE, Royal Military Police
- Brigadier-General Sir Godfrey Thomas, 9th Baronet
- Lieutenant-General Henry Thomas
- General Sir Ivor Thomas
- Major-General Jeremy Hywel Thomas
- Brigadier John Francis "Jack" Thomas CBE, Royal Military Police
- Major-General Lechmere Thomas
- General Sir Noel Thomas
- Major-General Vivian Davenport Thomas
- Major-General Walter Babington Thomas
- Major-General Charles Simeon Thomason
- Major-General Christopher Noel Thompson CB, Royal Engineers colonel commandment
- Lieutenant-General Sir Geoffrey Thompson
- Major-General Julian Thompson, Royal Marines
- Brigadier Nicholas Herbert Thompson CBE ADC, Royal Engineers
- Major-General Thomas Perronet Thompson
- Brigadier Timothy Kenrick Thompson
- Brigadier-General William Arthur Murray Thompson
- Brigadier Alan Fortescue Thomson (1880–1957)
- Major-General David Philips Thomson CB CBE MC
- Brigadier (James Alexander) John Thomson
- Major-General James Noel Thomson
- Brigadier Jonathan James Thomson
- Brigadier Michael Thomson
- General Sir Mowbray Thomson KCSI KH
- Brigadier-General Noel Arbuthnot Thomson CMG DSO, GOC Infantry Brigade, Seaforth Highlanders
- Lieutenant-General Sir William Montgomerie Thomson
- Brigadier Jeremy William Richard Thorn CBE, Royal Engineers
- General Sir Andrew Thorne
- Major-General Sir David Thorne
- Brigadier Michael Everard Thorne
- Major-General Alexander Thorneycroft
- Major-General Gervase Thorpe
- Brigadier Gerald Thubron
- Major-General Harry Cumming-Bruce, 7th Baron Thurlow
- Brigadier Peter Thwaites
- General Sir William Thwaites
- Major-General Sir Reginald Thynne
- Brigadier John Gerhard Edward Tiarks
- Lieutenant-General Sir Christopher Tickell
- Major-General Marston Tickell
- Brigadier Ord Tidbury
- Major-General Patrick Anthony Macartan Tighe
- Brigadier Thomas William Tilbrook, Queen's Royal Irish Hussars
- Major-General Philip Blencowe Tillard
- Major-General Henry Michael Tillotson CB CBE (1928–2023), Colonel, Prince of Wales's Own Regiment of Yorkshire
- Brigadier Robert Tilney
- Brigadier John Tiltman
- Brigadier John Titley
- Brigadier Edward Joseph Todhunter
- Major-General David Arthur Hodges Toler
- Major-General Sir Humphry Tollemache, Bt.
- Lieutenant-General Thomas Tollemache
- Major-General Sir Henry Tombs
- Major-General John Tombs
- General William Percival Tomkins CIE (1841— ), Royal Engineers colonel commandment
- Brigadier Henry Archdale Tomkinson
- Major-General Michael John Tomlinson CB OBE, Royal Artillery
- Major-General David Phillips Thomson CB CBE MC, Argyll and Sutherland Highlanders
- Brigadier George Herbert Norris Todd
- General Patrick Tonyn
- Brigadier Richard Toomey
- Brigadier Sir Philip Toosey
- Brigadier Michael Robert Topple CBE ADC, Royal Corps of Signals
- Major-General Sir Henry Torrens
- Lieutenant-General Sir Henry Torrens
- Brigadier Edward John Torrens-Spence CBE, Royal Dragoon Guards
- Major-General George Byng, 3rd Viscount Torrington
- General John Gray Touch (c. 1822–1902), Madras Staff Corps
- Brigadier Rowland Henry Towell
- Brigadier Peter Gerald Sandeman Tower
- Major-General Philip Tower
- Brigadier Ian Glen Townsend
- Major-General Sir Charles Townshend
- Field Marshal George Townshend, 1st Marquess Townshend
- Lieutenant-General Sir Frederick Traill-Burroughs
- General Sir Richard Trant
- General Cyrus Trapaud
- Brigadier Basil Charles Trappes-Lomax (1896–1963)
- General James Travers
- Brigadier-General Jonas Hamilton du Boulay Travers
- Lieutenant-General Sir Paul Travers
- Brigadier-General Hon. John Frederick Hepburn-Stuart-Forbes-Trefusis (1878–1915)
- Major-General Sir Francis Harper Treherne KCMG
- Major-General Charles Trelawny
- Brigadier-General Henry Trelawny
- Major-General Erroll Tremlett
- Marshal of the Royal Air Force Hugh Trenchard, 1st Viscount Trenchard
- Major-General Ivor Herbert, 1st Baron Treowen
- Brigadier-General Herbert Trevor
- Major-General William Spottiswoode Trevor
- Brigadier-General Edward Fynmore Trew DSO, Royal Marines
- Lieutenant-General William Henry Lainson Tripp CB DSO, Royal Marine Artillery, Royal Marines
- General Sir Charles Trollope
- Major-General Robert Nixon Tronson
- Brigadier-General Gerald Trotter
- Major-General Sir Henry Trotter
- Lieutenant-General Sir Philip Trousdell
- Major-General Ashley Truluck
- Brigadier Charles Tryon, 2nd Baron Tryon
- Lieutenant-General William Tryon
- Major-General Anthony John Trythall CB, Royal Army Educational Corps
- Lieutenant-General Sir Charles Tucker
- Major-General Sir Hugh Tudor
- Lieutenant-General Sir Francis Tuker
- Major-General Sir Alexander Bruce Tulloch
- Major-General Sir Alexander Murray Tulloch
- Major-General John Walter Graham Tulloch
- Major-General Sir Alfred Edward Turner
- Brigadier Arthur Turner
- Major-General Charles Turner
- Brigadier Michael Henry Turner
- Lieutenant-General Sir William Turner
- Major-General Patrick George Turpin
- General Sir Harry Tuzo
- Field Marshal George Hay, 8th Marquess of Tweeddale
- Brigadier John William Tweedie
- Brigadier Oliver Robert Tweedy
- General Sir Philip Geoffrey Twining
- Major-General David Tyacke
- Brigadier-General Arthur Malcolm Tyler CB DSO, Royal Garrison Artillery
- Major-General Christopher Tyler CB (1934–2017), Royal Electrical and Mechanical Engineers
- Brigadier-General James Arbuthnot Tyler, CRA
- Major-General Sir Leslie Tyler
- Major-General Timothy Tyler
- Major-General Trevor Bruce Tyler CB CSI DL, Royal Artillery, Glamorganshire Territorial Force Association Chairman
- Brigadier-General Julian Dallas Tyndale Tyndale-Biscoe, Remount Depot Commandant
- Field Marshal James O'Hara, 2nd Baron Tyrawley
- Brigadier William Grant Tyrrell DSO, Royal Engineers
- Brigadier-General John Tytler VC

== U ==
- Major-General Peter Alfred Ullman (1897–1972)
- Brigadier-General Percy Umfreville KCMG, Royal West Kent Regiment, Military Prisons Director
- Brigadier William Ernest Underhill (1898–1968)
- Lieutenant-General Sir Herbert Crofton Campbell Uniacke, GOC Royal Artillery
- Brigadier Robert Babington Everard Upton (1896–1977)
- Lieutenant General Sir Tyrone Urch
- Major-General Robert Elliott Urquhart (1901–1988)
- Major-General Ronald Urquhart
- Brigadier Thomas Clive Usher (1907–1982)
- Major-General John Edward Utterson-Kelso CB DSO OBE MC (1893–1972)
- Brigadier Sir Robin Unsworth 1941 to date

== V ==
- Major-General Henry Tanfield Vachell ( —1902), Royal Artillery
- Brigadier Croxton Sillery Vale (1896–1975)
- General Charles Vallancey
- Brigadier Claude Max Vallentin (1896— )
- Major-General Albert Robert Valon (1885–1971)
- Major-General B. G. van der Gucht (c. 1828–1902), Bengal Staff Corps
- Brigadier Rupert van der Horst CBE, Royal Marines
- Brigadier Mark Charles van der Lande CBE, Life Guards
- General Sir John Ormsby Vandeleur (1763–1849)
- Brigadier Joe Vandeleur (1903–1988)
- Brigadier Jacob William van Reenan (1889— )
- General George Henry Vansittart
- Brigadier Arthur Bowen van Straubenzee (1891–1967)
- Major-General Sir Casimir Cartwright van Straubenzee (1867–1956), GOC Royal Artillery
- Brigadier-General Casimir Henry Claude Van Straubenzee (1864–1943) GOC Infantry Brigade
- General Sir Charles van Straubenzee (1812–1892)
- Major-General Turner van Straubenzee (1838–1920)
- Brigadier William Edmund Vaudrey (1894–1968)
- Berkeley Vaughan, GOC Infantry Brigade
- Edward Vaughan, GOC Infantry Brigade
- Henry Osman Vaughan CHA
- Lieutenant-General Sir John Vaughan (c. 1731–1795)
- Major-General John Vaughan CB DSO DL JP (1871–1956), 7th Queen's Own Hussars, 10th Royal Hussars, 3rd Cavalry Brigade, 3rd Cavalry Division
- Lieutenant-General Sir Louis Ridley Vaughan, General Staff major general
- Major-General Robert Edward Vaughan, DA & QMG
- Brigadier Edward William Drummond VaughanCB DSO MC (1894–1953), 3rd Indian Motor Brigade
- Brigadier Gerald Birdwood Vaughan-Hughes (1896–1983)
- Brigadier Charles Hilary Vaughan Pritchard (1905–1976)
- Major-General Nick Vaux
- Brigadier Harley Gerald Veasey (1896–1982)
- Brigadier Sir Charles Michael Dillwyn-Venables-Llewelyn (1900–1976)
- Brigadier David John Venn
- Brigadier Arthur Noel Venning (1895–1986), 5th West African Brigade
- General Sir Walter King Venning (1882–1964)
- Major-General Francis Ventris
- Major-General Sir Charles Broke Vere
- Brigadier Anthony Peter Verey QVRM TD DL, Royal Corps of Signals
- Brigadier Henry Richard Wentworth Vernon
- Major-General William Henry McNeile Verschoyle-Campbell (1884–1946)
- General Sir Ivo Vesey
- Brigadier John Vicary (1893— )
- Brigadier James Sholto Vickers (1910— )
- Lieutenant-General Sir Richard Vickers (1928–2024), Commandant of the Royal Military Academy Sandhurst
- Lieutenant-General Wilmot Gordon Hilton Vickers (1890–1987)
- Lieutenant-General Sir Freddie Viggers
- Brigadier Richard Montague Villiers (1905–1973)
- General John Vincent
- Field Marshal Richard Vincent, Baron Vincent of Coleshill
- Brigadier Frederick Hubert Vinden (1895–1977)
- Brigadier Martin Vine (1953— ), Gloucestershire Regiment CO,
- Brigadier George Arthur Viner (1900— )
- Brigadier Anthony Chester Vivian CBE, Royal Welch Fusiliers
- Brigadier-General Sir Arthur Vivian
- Lieutenant-General Hussey Vivian, 1st Baron Vivian
- General Sir Robert Vivian
- Brigadier John Alan Vivian (1898— )
- Brigadier Robert John Volkers (1908— )
- Major-General Michael von Bertele
- Brigadier John Leslie Von der Heyde (1896–1974)
- Major-General Sir Stanley von Donop
- Major-General Rudolf Carl von Slatin
- Major-General William John Vousden
- Brigadier Stephen George Vowles
- Major-General Colwyn Henry Hughes Vulliamy (1894–1972)
- General Richard Vyse
- Major-General Richard William Howard Vyse
- Major-General Charles Gerard Courtenay Vyvyan (1944— )
- Major-General Ralph Ernest Vyvyan (1891–1971)

== W ==
- Brigadier-General Edward Gurth Wace CBE DSO, Royal Engineers
- Brigadier Thomas Thelwall Waddington (1888–1958)
- Major-General Ashton Wade (1898–1996)
- Brigadier Charles Gordon Campbell Wade (1900— )
- Brigadier Ernest Wentworth Wade (1889–1952)
- Field Marshal George Wade
- Brigadier-General Thomas Stewart Herschel Wade, Lancashire Fusiliers
- Major-General Frederick William George Wadeson CB (c. 1860–1920), British Indian Army
- Brigadier Richard Danvers Waghorn (1896–1975)
- Brigadier-General William Danvers Waghorn CB CMG, Royal Engineers Chief Engineer
- Major-General Cyril Mosley Wagstaff CB CMG CIE DSO (1878–1934), Royal Military Academy, Woolwich commander
- Major-General George Wahab (1752–1808) Father of Generals George Lancelot, James & Charles Wahab
- Major-General George Wahab (1775–1843) Nephew of previous
- Major-General George Lancelot Wahab (1782–1846)
- Major-General James Wahab CB (1783–1842)
- Lieutenant-General Charles Wahab (1802–1871)
- Brigadier-General Arthur Reginald Wainwright, Royal Artillery
- Major-General Charles Brian Wainwright (1893–1968)
- Major-General Sir Hereward Wake, 13th Baronet CB CMG DSO (1876–1963), King's Royal Rifle Corps, Supreme War Council secretariat, 12th Armoured Brigade Combat Team, 46th (North Midland) Division, Home Guard
- Brigadier John Chrysostom Barnabas Wakeford (1898–1989)
- Major-General Arthur Victor Trocke Wakely (1886–1959)
- Brigadier Arthur Gordon Walch (1906— )
- General John Waldegrave, 3rd Earl Waldegrave
- Brigadier Oswald John Waldram
- General Charles Wale
- Brigadier Owen Murton Wales (1895–1969)
- Charles, Prince of Wales (1948— ), Royal Navy, Royal Air Force
- Brigadier-General Alexander Walker
- General Sir Antony Walker
- Brigadier Edward John Worley Walker
- General Sir George Walker, 1st Baronet
- Lieutenant-General Sir Harold Walker KCB KCMG DSO (1862–1934), Duke of Cornwall's Light Infantry, British Indian Army, 1st Division (Australia), 48th (South Midland) Division
- Brigadier-General Henry Alexander Walker CB CMG DSO JP (1874–1953), Royal Fusiliers, King's African Rifles
- Brigadier John Eric Walker (1898— )
- Brigadier John Francis Walker DSO, (1901–1979), King's Own Yorkshire Light Infantry
- Major-General Joseph Walker (1890–1965)
- General Sir Mark Walker VC
- Field Marshal Michael Walker, Baron Walker of Aldringham
- Brigadier Niel Alexander McDonald Walker (1895–1960)
- Brigadier Robert Fowler Walker (1890–1976)
- Brigadier Roderick Walker
- Brigadier Rodney Clive Walker CBE, Royal Artillery
- General Sir Roland Walker KCB DSO
- General Sir Walter Walker
- Major-General William George Walker
- Major-General John Christopher Walkey (1903–1989)
- Major-General Alec Walkling
- General Sir Peter Wall
- Major-General Robert Percival Walter Wall
- Major-General Charles John Wallace (1886–1943)
- Lieutenant-General Sir Christopher Wallace
- Major-General Sir Cuthbert Sidney Wallace, Bt.
- General Sir John Alexander Wallace
- General Peter Margetson Wallace
- Brigadier Quentin Vaughan Brooke Wallace (1891— )
- Major-General Sir George Henry Waller, 3rd Baronet
- Brigadier Robert Peel Waller (1895— )
- Brigadier-General Francis Edward Wallerstein CB GOC Infantry Brigade
- Major-General Algernon Ransome Wallis (1896— )
- Brigadier Cedric Wallis (1896–1982)
- Brigadier Charles Robinson Ashby Wallis (1898–1962)
- Major-General Colin Sainthill Wallis-King OBE (1926–2012), Coldstream Guards
- Brigadier Arthur Walmesley-White CBE, Royal Engineers
- Brigadier Arthur Patrick Walsh (1899— )
- Major-General Francis James Walsh (1900–1987)
- Major-General George Peregrine Walsh (1899–1972)
- General Hunt Walsh
- Major-General Michael Walsh
- Richard Knox Walsh CB CMG DSO, Royal Scots Fusiliers
- Brigadier-General Frederick William Henry Walshe, Royal Artillery
- Brigadier-General Henry Ernest Walshe, 27th Infantry Brigade, South Staffordshire Regiment
- Lieutenant-General George de Grey, 3rd Baron Walsingham
- Brigadier Edward Charles Walthall Delves Walthall, Royal Artillery
- Brigadier William Edward Walters-Symons (1896— )
- Brigadier Bendyshe Brome Walton (1905–1987)
- Brigadier Sir George Hands Walton ( —1976)
- Major-General Joseph Walton
- Brigadier-General L.B. Walton
- Brigadier Walter Frederick Walton (1899— )
- Major-General Robert Wanless O'Gowan CB CMG (1864–1947), 31st Division GOC
- Major-General Llewelyn Wansbrough-Jones (1900–1974)
- Brigadier-General Robert Loyd-Lindsay, 1st Baron Wantage
- Major-General John Rollo Noel Warburton (1890–1962)
- General Sir Dudley Ward (1905–1991)
- Major-General Francis Ward
- Brigadier Frederick Ward MC
- Major-General Henry Dudley Ossulston Ward Royal Artillery Brigadier-General
- Major-General Sir Philip Ward
- General Sir Richard Ward
- Major-General Robert Ward
- Major-General Anthony Ward-Booth
- Major-General John Ward-Harrison
- General Sir Edward Charles Warde
- General George Warde
- General Sir Francis Warde
- Major-General William Henry Wardell (c.1838–1903), Royal Artillery
- Lieutenant-General Richard Wardlaw
- General Sir Alexander Wardrop, Royal Artillery GOC
- Brigadier George Thexton Wards (1897–1991)
- Major-General Sir Fabian Arthur Goulstone Ware KCVO KBE CB CMG, British Red Cross, Commonwealth War Graves Commission Head, Imperial War Graves Commission founder
- Brigadier Richard Fenwick Ware (1899— )
- Brigadier Michael Henry Frank Waring (1905— )
- Brigadier Brian Kenneth Warner
- Lieutenant-General Sir William Warre
- General Sir Charles Warren
- Surgeon Major-General John Warren (1835–1905)
- Major-General Dermot Frederick William Warren (1895–1945)
- Brigadier Edward Galway Warren (1893–1975)
- General George Warren (1801–1884)
- Brigadier Harbin Edward Warry (1895— )
- Lieutenant-General Sydney Rigby Wason (1887–1969)
- Major-General George Guy Waterhouse (1886–1975)
- General Sir John Waters (1935–2025), Deputy Supreme Allied Commander Europe
- Brigadier Bernard Springett Watkins (1900–1977)
- Major-General Guy Hansard Watkins CB OBE, 1st Artillery Brigade, Royal Artillery (–2026)
- Major-General Harry Reginald Bristow Watkins (1894— )
- General Sir Henry Bulckley Burlton Watkis CB, British Indian Army
- Major-General Geoffrey Lionel Watkinson (1899–1971)
- Major-General Andrew Linton Watson
- Major-General Charles Moore Watson
- General Sir Daril Watson (1888–1967)
- Major-General David Watson KCB CMG (1869–1922), 2nd Battalion CEF, 2nd Canadian Division, 4th Canadian Division
- Brigadier E.E. Watson
- Major-General Gilbert France Watson (1895–1976)
- Lieutenant-General Sir James Watson
- General Sir John Watson VC GCB (1829–1919), Bengal Army, British Indian Army
- General John Watson Tadwell Watson (1748–1826), 3rd Regiment of Foot Guards
- Major-General Norman Vyvyan Watson (1898–1974)
- Major-General Stuart Watson CBE (1922–2022), Colonel of the 13th/18th Royal Hussars
- Major-General William Arthur Watson CB CMG CIE, Imperial Cadet Corps, British Indian Army
- Brigadier Donald Munro Watt DSO, 145th Infantry Brigade GOC
- General Sir Redmond Watt
- General Louis de Watteville
- Lieutenant-General Sir Herbert Edward Watts KCB KCMG, 7th Infantry Division, XIX Corps
- Lieutenant-General Sir John Watts
- Major-General Andrew Gilbert Wauchope
- General Sir Arthur Grenfell Wauchope
- Major-General Sir Andrew Scott Waugh
- Brigadier Thomas Ian Macdonald Waugh CBE, Royal Corps of Signals
- Field Marshal Archibald Wavell, 1st Earl Wavell
- Major-General Archibald Graham Wavell
- Brigadier Gordon Redvers Way (1900–1981)
- Lieutenant-General Sir Gregory Way
- Brigadier Jack Cassell Waycott (1898— )
- Lieutenant-General Daniel Webb
- Brigadier Francis Wynne Webb (1907–1968)
- General John Richmond Webb
- Air Vice Marshal (formerly Brigadier-General) Sir Tom Webb-Bowen KCB CMG DL, Royal Air Force
- Brigadier-General William Ince Webb-Bowen DSO, Middlesex Regiment GOC
- Brigadier Brian Wolseley Webb-Carter
- Major-General Sir Evelyn John Webb-Carter
- Brigadier-General Norman William Webber CMG DSO (1881–1950), Canadian Corps commander, General Staff,
- Brigadier Samuel Thomas Webber CBE, Royal Electrical and Mechanical Engineers
- Major-General Bryan Courtney Webster CB CBE, Royal Regiment of Fusiliers
- Brigadier Richard Sheffield Webster
- Brigadier John Wedderburn-Maxwell (1894–1990)
- Brigadier-General Gilbert Henry Wedgwood (1876–1963), York and Lancaster Regiment GOC
- Brigadier-General Sir Ralph Wedgwood, 1st Baronet KCB CMG TD (1874–1956)
- Brigadier David Weeks
- Lieutenant-General Ronald Weeks, 1st Baron Weeks (1890–1960)
- General Sir George Alexander Weir KCB CMG DSO DL (1876–1951), 84th Brigade, 55th Infantry Division, British Troops in Egypt
- Brigadier Edward Theyre Weigall (1895— )
- Major-General Colin Weir
- General Sir George Weir (1876–1951)
- Brigadier Richard Ambrose Weir (1891— )
- Major-General Sir Christopher Welby-Everard (1909–1996)
- Brigadier Anthony Cleland Welch
- Brigadier John Digby Welch (1903–1963)
- Major-General Nick Welch
- Brigadier Godfrey de Vere Welchman (1894— )
- Brigadier Robert Maximilian Armitage Welchman (1898— )
- Major-General Charles Joseph Weld (1893–1962)
- Brigadier Hamilton Edward Crosdill Weldon
- Major-General Lord Charles Wellesley
- Brigadier-General Richard Ashmore Colley Wellesley, Royal Artillery
- Field Marshal Arthur Wellesley, 1st Duke of Wellington
- Lieutenant-General Arthur Wellesley, 2nd Duke of Wellington
- Brigadier Charles Anthony Gilbert Wells CBE, 15th/19th The King's Royal Hussars, Light Dragoons
- General Sir Colville Wemyss (1891–1959)
- General David Douglas Wemyss
- General Sir James Wemyss of Caskieberry
- General William Wemyss, 93rd Highlanders
- Lieutenant-General Thomas Wentworth
- Major-General Sir Harold Wernher, 3rd Baronet (1893–1973), Department of Co-ordination of Ministries Service Facilities
- Major-General Clement Arthur West (1892–1972)
- General Sir Michael Montgomerie Alston Roberts West (1905–1978)
- General Sir John Westall
- Brigadier Ernest Walter Davie Western (1901–1952)
- Brigadier-General Claude Berners Westmacott GOC Infantry Brigade
- Brigadier Peter Germanus Westmacott (1894— )
- Major-General Gerald Grosvenor, 6th Duke of Westminster
- General John Fane, 11th Earl of Westmorland
- Lieutenant-Colonel Percy Thuillier Westmorland CMG DSO (1863–1929), 10th Battalion, London Regiment, 151st (Durham Light Infantry) Brigade
- Lieutenant-General Eric Culpeper Weston (1888–1950)
- Brigadier-General Spencer Vaughan Percy Weston, GOC Infantry Brigade
- Major-General Victor John Eric Westropp (1897–1964)
- General Sir Frederick Augustus Wetherall
- General Sir George Wetherall
- Lieutenant-General Sir Harry Edward de Robillard Wetherall (1889–1979)
- Major-General William Leonard Whalley CB, Royal Army Ordnance Corps
- Chief Controller Dame Leslie Whateley DBE TD (1899— ), Auxiliary Territorial Service Director
- Major-General Sir Henry Wheatley, 1st Baronet
- Brigadier-General Leonard Lane Wheatley CMG DSO, Argyll and Sutherland Highlanders
- Major-General Mervyn Savile Wheatley (1900–1979)
- Brigadier-General Philip Wheatley, Royal Artillery
- Brigadier Robert Wheatley CBE, Royal Engineers
- Brigadier Sir Edward Oliver Wheeler (1890–1962)
- Major-General Norman Wheeler
- General Sir Roger Wheeler
- Major-General Sir Francis Wheler, 10th Baronet
- General Thomas Whetham
- Major-General Robert Whigham (c. 1837–1902), 16th The Queen's Lancers
- General Sir Robert Whigham GCB KCMG DSO (1865–1950), Royal Warwickshire Regiment, II Corps, 59th Division, 62nd Division
- General Sir Edward Charles Whinyates
- General George Palmer Whish (1813–1902), Bengal Staff Corps
- General Sir William Sampson Whish
- Major-General Alwyne Michael Webster Whistler (1909–1993)
- General Sir Lashmer Gordon Whistler (1898–1963)
- Major-General Harry Colwell Whitaker (1892–1975)
- Major-General Sir John Albert Charles Whitaker (1897–1957)
- Major-General Philip Sidney Whitcombe (1893–1989)
- Brigadier Aubrey Edward White (1895–1980)
- Major-General Cecil Meadows Frith White (1897–1985)
- Brigadier Christopher Anthony White (1900–1969)
- General Sir Cyril Brudenell Bingham White, General Staff
- Brigadier Cyril Jennings White (1898— )
- Brigadier Denis White (1910–2000)
- Brigadier E.H.L. White
- Major-General Geoffrey Herbert Anthony White, Royal Artillery
- Field Marshal Sir George White
- Major-General Gilbert Anthony White
- Brigadier Gilbert William White MBE (1912–1977)
- General Sir Henry Dalrymple White
- Major-General Sir Martin White
- Brigadier Michael White (1913–2003)
- Major-General Percival Napier White (1901–1982)
- General Sir Robert White KCB (1827–1902), Eastern Command GOC
- Brigadier-General William Lewis White, DA & QMG
- Lieutenant-General Sir Barney White-Spunner
- Brigadier-General Hugh Davie White-Thomson, Royal Artillery
- Major-General Philip Geoffrey Whitefoord (1894–1975)
- Major-General Andrew Francis Whitehead CB DSO, Royal Marines
- Major-General Sir Thomas Whitehead
- Brigadier Robert Douglas Whitehill (1892— )
- Major-General Gerald Abson Whiteley CB DSO OBE, Army Legal Services Branch
- General Sir John Whiteley (1896–1970)
- Brigadier John Percival Whiteley
- General Sir Peter Whiteley
- Lieutenant-General John Whitelocke
- Brigadier Murray Courtenay Whiteside OBE, Royal Green Jackets (1962— ), Army Air Corps
- Major-General Gerald Herbert Penn Whitfield (1896— )
- Lieutenant-General Henry Wase Whitfield
- Major-General John Yeldham Whitfield (1899–1971
- Major-General Albert Edward Whitley
- Brigadier-General Edward Nathan Whitley, Royal Artillery
- Lieutenant-General Sir George Cornish Whitlock KCB (1798–1868), Madras Army
- Lieutenant-General William Henry Whitlock (1833–1900), Madras Army
- Lieutenant-General Sir Edmund Whitmore
- Major-General Sir George Whitmore
- Major-General Robert Frederick Edward Whittaker (1894–1967)
- Lieutenant-General Sir Samuel Ford Whittingham
- Brigadier-General Cecil Henry Whittington
- Brigadier Gerald Eden Mynors Whittuck MC, Somerset Light Infantry
- Major-General Henry Martin Whitty (1896–1961)
- Brigadier Noel Irwine Whitty
- Major-General Rex Whitworth
- Brigadier John Wickham (1897— )
- Brigadier John Widgery, Baron Widgery
- Brigadier Leslie Frederick Ethelbert Wieler (1899–1965)
- Brigadier-General John Tyson Wigan
- Brigadier-General Edgar Askin Wiggin
- Brigadier James Buckley Aquilla Wigmore (1887–1962)
- General Sir Kenneth Wigram GCB CSI CBE DSO (1875–1949), Chief of the General Staff, Northern Command GO Commanding-in-Chief
- Brigadier-General Herbert William Wilberforce CB CMG (1833–1856), Royal Navy
- General Sir Richard Wilbraham
- Lieutenant-General Sir Alfred Thomas Wilde KCB CSI (1819–1878)
- Brigadier Alec Warren Greenlaw Wildey (1890— )
- Brigadier-General Charles Arthur Wilding GOC Infantry Brigade
- Major-General Murray Leslie Wildman CBE CEng, Royal Electrical and Mechanical Engineers
- Major-General Godfrey Edward Wildman-Lushington (1897–1970)
- Brigadier H.O. Wiley ( —1960)
- General Sir Michael Wilkes
- Lieutenant-General Sir Michael Wilkins
- Brigadier Charles Edward Wilkinson CBE TD ADC, Worcestershire and Sherwood Foresters Regiment
- Brigadier Claude John "Jack" Wilkinson DSO (1903–1999), 77th Indian Infantry Brigade, 44th Airborne Division, Royal Norfolk Regiment
- Brigadier Clive Anthony Wilkinson
- Brigadier-General Ernest Berdoe Wilkinson (1864–1946), Royal Lincolnshire Regiment
- Lieutenant-General Sir Henry Clement Wilkinson
- Major-General Joseph Harold Wilkinson (1899–1954)
- Brigadier-General Montagu Grant Wilkinson CB CVO CMG GOC Infantry Brigade
- Major-General Sir Percival Spearman Wilkinson KCMG CB (1865–1953), Royal Northumberland Fusiliers GOC
- Major-General W. Wilkinson, Bombay Army
- Major-General Carew Lovell Wilks CB CBE, Royal Engineers
- Brigadier John Barford Wilks CBE ADC, Royal Engineers
- Brigadier Frank Godfrey Willan CB CMG DSO, King's Royal Rifle Corps
- Lieutenant-General Harry Willans (1892–1943)
- Brigadier John Harte Harris Willans (1902— )
- Major-General Anthony Patrick Willasey-Wilsey CB MBE MC, 40 Commando
- General Sir James Willcocks GCB GCMG KCSI DSO (1857–1926), Prince of Wales's Leinster Regiment (Royal Canadians), British Indian Army
- Lieutenant-General Sir Michael Willcocks
- Lieutenant-General Sir Henry Beresford Dennitts Willcox (1889–1968)
- Major-General Aubrey Ellis Williams (1888–1977)
- Brigadier Cecil James Williams (1898–1948)
- Brigadier Dennis Williams (1936–2013)
- Brigadier Edgar Trevor Williams (1912–1995)
- Major-General Edward Alexander Wilmot Williams (1910–1994)
- Edward George Williams BEM, Royal National Lifeboat Institution
- Brigadier Edward Steven Bruce Williams (1892–1977)
- Brigadier Ernest Peter James Williams
- General Sir Fenwick Williams, 1st Baronet, of Kars
- Brigadier Frederick Christian Williams (1891–1970)
- Brigadier George Giffard Rawson Williams (1894— )
- Brigadier-General (Gideon) Coventry Williams
- General Sir Guy Williams, KCB CMG DSO (1881–1959) GOC Eastern Command
- Lieutenant-General Sir Harold Williams KBE CB (1897–1971), Royal Engineers, Bengal Sappers and Miners, 1st Division Commander Royal Engineer, IV Corps Chief Engineer, Indian Engineers Colonel Commandment
- Major-General Sir Hugh Bruce Williams KCB DSO, 37th Division GOC
- Major-General Sir Leslie Hamlyn Williams (1892–1956)
- Brigadier-General Oliver De Lancey Williams CMG DSO, Royal Welsh Fusiliers
- Lieutenant-General Owen Williams
- Major-General Peter Gage Williams
- Brigadier Reginald Thomas Williams (1897— )
- Brigadier Stephen Williams (1896— )
- Brigadier-General Sydney Frederick Williams CMG (1866–1942), Royal Engineers Chief Engineer
- Brigadier Thomas Gwyn Williams CBE, 14th/20th King's Hussars, Queen's Royal Hussars
- Brigadier Thomas Victor Williams (1897— )
- Major-General Victor Arthur Seymour Williams CMG (1867–1949), The Royal Canadian Dragoons, CFB Valcartier Commander, II Corps, II Corps, 8th Canadian Infantry Brigade
- Major-General Walter David Abbott Williams (1897–1973)
- Major-General Weir de Lancey Williams CMG DSO, Royal Hampshire Regiment
- Brigadier Hudleston Noel Hedworth Williamson MC, Royal Field Artillery
- Brigadier Maurice Joseph Williamson (1889–1958)
- Major-General William Williamson
- Brigadier Hugh Charles Gregory Willing
- Major-General Edward Willis, Royal Artillery
- Lieutenant-General Sir Frederick Willis
- General Sir George Willis
- Major-General John Brooker Willis CB, 10th Royal Hussars
- Lieutenant-General Sir David Willison
- Brigadier Arthur Cecil Willison (1896–1966)
- Major-General Edward George Willmott CB OBE, Royal Engineers Colonel Commandment
- Brigadier the Honourable Henry Ernest Christopher Willoughby
- Major-General Sir John Willoughby
- Major-General Michael Willoughby
- General Sir Charles Wills
- Brigadier John Howard German Wills (1899— )
- General Sir Thomas Willshire, Bart.
- Brigadier Graham Horace Wilmer
- Major-General John Harold Owen Wilsey
- General Sir John Finlay Willasey Wilsey (1939–2019)
- Major-General Sir Alexander Wilson
- Lieutenant-General Sir Archdale Wilson, 1st Baronet
- Brigadier Barrington Wilson
- Major-General Bevil Thomson Wilson (1885–1975)
- Brigadier Charles Stuart Wilson, Royal Engineers
- Major-General Christopher Wilson
- Brigadier Constantine Patrick Bartlett Wilson (1899— )
- Major-General Dare Wilson
- Major-General David Wilson
- Brigadier Donald Ruthven Wilson CBE, Black Watch
- Brigadier Edward William Gravatt Wilson (1888–1971)
- Major-General Francis Adrian Wilson, Royal Artillery
- Frederick Maurice Wilson CB CMG, Royal Army Service Corps
- Major-General Geoffrey Boyd Wilson CB, 1st Artillery Brigade
- Lieutenant-General Sir Gordon Wilson (1887–1971)
- Lieutenant-General Sir Henry Fuller Maitland Wilson KCB KCMG (1859–1941), Western Front
- Field Marshal Sir Henry Wilson, 1st Baronet GCB DSO (1864–1922), Chief of the General Staff, IV Corps, Rifle Brigade
- Field Marshal Henry Maitland Wilson, 1st Baron Wilson
- Lieutenant-General Sir James Wilson
- Brigadier James Wilson (1922–2006), United Kingdom Land Forces HQ Deputy QMG
- Major-General James Barnett Wilson
- General Sir John Wilson
- Major-General John Wilson
- Major-General Nigel Maitland Wilson (1884–1950)
- Brigadier Philip Joseph Wilson (1917-1982) London Rifle Brigade, Indian Army Service Corps, Royal Army Service Corps, Army Catering Corps
- General Sir Robert Thomas Wilson
- General Sir Roger Cochrane Wilson (1882–1966)
- Major-General Samuel Wilson
- Brigadier-General Sir Samuel Herbert Wilson, General Staff
- Major-General Thomas Arthur Atkinson Wilson (1882–1958)
- Major-General Thomas Needham Furnival Wilson (1896–1961)
- General Sir Thomas Spencer Wilson, 6th Baronet
- Brigadier Sir Mathew John Anthony "Tony" Wilson OBE MC (1935–2019), 5th Infantry Brigade
- Brigadier Adam Tyrie Wilson-Brand (1900— )
- Major-General Donald James Wilson-Haffenden (1900–1986)
- Brigadier Arthur John Millard Wilton (1898— )
- Major-General Douglas Neil Wimberley (1896–1983)
- Brigadier Richard Arabin Armine Wimberley (Indian Army officer) (1897–1986)
- Brigadier James Hennessy, 2nd Baron Windlesham
- Brigadier John Stephen Windsor (1894— )
- Brigadier Christopher Winfield CBE (1944— )
- Major-General Frederick Drummond Vincent Wing CB (1860–1915), 12th (Eastern) Infantry Division
- Major-General Orde Charles Wingate (1903–1944)
- General Sir Reginald Wingate
- Brigadier Anthony Desmond Rex Wingfield (1908–1995)
- Major-General Maurice Anthony Wingfield (1883–1956)
- Brigadier-General Cecil Wingfield-Stratford
- Brigadier Norman Douglas Wingrove (1903— )
- Brigadier-General Charles Rupert Peter Winser DSO CMG King's Own Royal Regiment (Lancaster)
- Major-General John Winslow
- Brigadier Herbert Gregory Winter (1890–1949)
- Brigadier-General Sir Ormond de l'Epée Winter, Royal Artillery
- Brigadier Harold St. John Loyd Winterbotham
- Major-General Sir John Winterton
- Brigadier Hugh Erskine Winthrop (1897— )
- Brigadier Arthur Kilgour Wintle (1905— )
- Major-General Fitzgerald Wintour CB CBE (1869–1945), Queen's Own Royal West Kent Regiment
- Brigadier-General Evan Alexander Wisdom CB CMG DSO VD 7th Brigade (Australia), 18th Battalion (Australia)
- Lieutenant-General Somerset M. Wiseman Clarke
- Major-General Billy Withall
- Brigadier Richard Leigh Withinton (1893–1969)
- Brigadier-General William Maunder Withycombe CB CMG DSO, 3rd West Riding Infantry Brigade
- Major-General John Evered Witt (1897–1989)
- Brigadier Frank Hole Witts (1887–1941)
- Lieutenant-General Frederick Witts (1889–1969)
- Brigadier Edmond Wodehouse (1894–1960)
- General Sir Josceline Wodehouse
- Lieutenant-General Edward Wolfe
- Major-General George Douglas Dunlevie Wolfe (c. 1826–1902)
- Major-General James Wolfe
- Field Marshal Garnet Wolseley, 1st Viscount Wolseley
- Brigadier John Noel Wolsey CBE , Adjutant General's Corps, Staff and Personnel Support Branch
- Major-General Denys Broomfield Wood CB (1923–2025), Director of Quartering
- Brigadier-General Edward Allan Wood CMG DSO (1865–1930), King's Shropshire Light Infantry, 55th Infantry Brigade
- Major-General Edward Alexander Wood CB (1841–1898), 10th Royal Hussars
- Lieutenant-General Sir Ernest Wood (1894–1971)
- Field Marshal Sir Evelyn Wood VC GCB GCMG
- Major-General George Wood (1898–1982)
- Brigadier Henry Wood (1906–1988)
- Major-General Sir James Wood, 2nd Baronet
- Brigadier John Morton Devereux Wood (1898–1973)
- Brigadier Leonard Walter Wood (1895–1972)
- Major-General Malcolm David Wood CBE, Royal Logistic Corps, Royal Army Ordnance Corps
- Brigadier-General Phillip Richard Wood, 139th (Sherwood Foresters) Brigade
- Lieutenant-General Robert Blucher Wood
- Brigadier Ronald Ernest Wood (1897–1987)
- Brigadier-General Thomas Birchall Wood, Royal Artillery
- Lieutenant-General Sir John Woodall (1897–1985)
- Brigadier Bill Woodburn
- Brigadier-General Wilfred James Woodcock DSO, Lancashire Fusiliers
- Lieutenant-General Sir Ralph Wooddisse
- Field Marshal Sir Alexander George Woodford
- Major-General David Woodford
- Brigadier Edward Cecil James Woodford (1901–1988)
- Major-General Sir John George Woodford
- Major-General Sir Edward Woodgate
- Brigadier James Woodham
- Brigadier Charles Hall Woodhouse (1891–1962)
- Brigadier E. Woodhouse
- Brigadier Francis Victor Reginald Woodhouse (1897–1987)
- Brigadier Harold Lister Woodhouse (1887–1960)
- Brigadier Harold Sealy Woodhouse (1894–1943)
- Major-General the Reverend Jonathan Woodhouse
- Brigadier Louis James Woodhouse (1896–1978)
- Major-General Sir Tom Percy Woodhouse KCMG CB, Surgeon General
- Brigadier-General Charles Richard Woodroffe (1878–1965), Royal Artillery DA & QMG
- Major-General Charles William Woods CB MBE MC (1917–1996), Royal Engineers
- Major-General Edward Ambrose Woods (1891–1957)
- Brigadier Edward Galbraith Woods (1906–1951)
- Major-General Ernest Woods (1894–1971)
- Major-General Henry Woods
- Brigadier-General Hugh Kennedy Woods Tank Brigade GOC
- Brigadier John Henry Woods (1891–1971)
- John Alfred Hudson Woodward, Infantry Brigade GOC
- Brigadier Douglas Stewart Hillersdon Woodward (1895–1980)
- Major-General Sir Edward Mabbutt Woodward
- Brigadier Richard Dean Townsend Woolfe (1888–1966)
- Lieutenant-General Sir Charles Woollcombe KCB KCMG (1857–1934), Allahabad Brigade, 20th Indian Brigade, 51st (Highland) Division, 11th (Northern) Division
- Major-General Christopher Geoffrey Woolner (1893–1984)
- Brigadier Bertie Woolnough
- Lieutenant-General Sir John Blaxell Woon
- Major-General Richard Montague Wootten (1889–1979)
- Brigadier Scott Ross Workman (1963— )
- Major-General Robert Wordsworth (1894–1984)
- Brigadier-General Rivers Berney Worgan, GOC Infantry Brigade
- Major-General Derrick Bruce Wormald
- Brigadier-General Frank Wormald, GOC Cavalry Brigade
- Brigadier David Eric Worsley
- Major-General Sir Henry Worsley
- Lieutenant-General Sir John Worsley
- General Sir Richard Worsley
- Major-General Geoffrey Christopher Hale Wortham (1913–1967)
- Lieutenant-General Henry Wray
- Brigadier-General John Cecil Wray, Royal Artillery
- Brigadier Antony Peter Wright
- Brigadier Arthur John Wright (1888— )
- Brigadier John Wright
- Brigadier Maurice Vernon Wright (1901— )
- Brigadier-General Wallace Duffield Wright, General Staff
- General Sir William Purvis Wright
- Lieutenant-General Sir Frederick George Wrisberg (1895–1982)
- Major-General John Wrottesley, 1st Baron Wrottesley
- Brigadier-General John Bartholomew Wroughton, Royal Sussex Regiment
- Brigadier Arthur Geoffrey Wyatt (1900–1960)
- Brigadier-General Louis John Wyatt, GOC Infantry Brigade
- Brigadier Richard John Penfold Wyatt (1892–1954)
- Brigadier Wilfred Penfold Wyatt (1889–1966)
- Major-General Sir Brian Wyldbore-Smith
- General William Wylde
- Brigadier-General Hon. Everard Humphrey Wyndham
- General Henry Wyndham
- General Sir Arthur Wynne
- Brigadier-General John George Erskine Wynne
- Brigadier-General Francis Arthur Wynter
- General Edward Buckley Wynyard
- Lieutenant-General William Wynyard

== X ==
- Lieutenant-General Sir David Ximenes

== Y ==
- Brigadier-General Hon. Henry Yarde-Buller MVO DSO CB
- Brigadier Morris Yates (1900— )
- Brigadier General Clement Yatman, GOC Infantry Brigade
- Brigadier Kenneth Darlaston Yearsley (1891— )
- Brigadier Herbert Charles James Yeo (1892— )
- Major-General Alan Yeoman
- Field Marshal Prince Frederick, Duke of York and Albany
- Field Marshal Sir Charles Yorke
- General John Yorke
- Major-General the Venerable John Youens
- Major-General Alexander Young
- Major-General Bernard Keith Young (1892–1969)
- Lieutenant-General Sir David Young
- Brigadier Desmond Young (1892–1966)
- Brigadier Henry Ayerst Young (1895–1952)
- Major-General James Young
- Brigadier-General Sir Julian Mayne Young (1872–1961)
- Major-General Peter Young
- Brigadier Peter Young (1915–1988)
- Major-General Robert Young, GOC Infantry Brigade
- Major-General Elton Younger
- Major-General Sir Jack Younger, Baronet.
- Major-General John Edward Talbot Younger (1888–1974)
- Major-General Ralph Younger (1904–1985)
- Major-General Sir George Younghusband
- Brigadier George Edward Younghusband (1896–1970)

== See also ==
- List of field marshals of the British Army
- List of British Army full generals
- List of serving senior officers of the British Army
- List of generals of the British Empire who died during the First World War
