= 1869 Birthday Honours =

Appointments by Queen Victoria

The 1869 Birthday Honours were appointments by Queen Victoria to various orders and honours to reward and highlight good works by citizens of the British Empire. The appointments were made to celebrate the official birthday of the Queen, and were published in The London Gazette on 2 June 4 June and 1 July 1869.

The recipients of honours are displayed here as they were styled before their new honour, and arranged by honour, with classes (Knight, Knight Grand Cross, etc.) and then divisions (Military, Civil, etc.) as appropriate.

== United Kingdom and British Empire ==
=== The Most Illustrious Order of Saint Patrick ===
==== Knight of the Most Illustrious Order of Saint Patrick (KP) ====
- Granville, Earl of Carysfort
- Archibald, Earl of Gosford

=== The Most Honourable Order of the Bath ===
==== Knight Grand Cross of the Order of the Bath (GCB) ====
===== Military Division =====
Royal Navy

- Admiral Sir Henry Prescott KCB
- Vice-Admiral Sir Augustus Kuper KCB

Army

- General George Charles, Earl of Lucan KCB
- General Sir Richard James Dacres KCB
- Lieutenant-General the Honourable Sir James Yorke Scarlett KCB
- Lieutenant-General Sir George Buller KCB

==== Knight Commander of the Order of the Bath (KCB) ====
===== Military Division =====
Royal Navy

- Vice-Admiral William Ramsay CB
- Vice-Admiral the Right Honourable Lord Clarence Edward Paget CB
- Vice Admiral Henry Kellett CB
- Rear Admiral Hastings Reginald Yelverton CB
- Rear-Admiral Bartholomew James Sulivan CB

Army

- Lieutenant-General George Frederick, Viscount Templetown CB
- Lieutenant-General Edward Huthwaite CB
- Major-General Frederick Horn CB
- Major-General Arthur Augustus Thurlow Cunynghame CB
- Major-General Lord George Augustus Frederick Paget CB
- Major-General Arthur Johnstone Lawrence CB
- Major-General Horatio Shirley CB
- Major-General William Jones CB
- Major-General John St George CB
- Major-General Edward Charles Warde CB
- Major-General James Brind CB
- Major-General the Right Honourable Percy Egerton Herbert CB
- Major-General John Lintorn Arabin Simmons CB
- Major-General Archibald Little CB
- Colonel Alfred Thomas Wilde CB CSI Madras Army
- Thomas Galbraith Logan CB Director-General of the Medical Department of the Army

==== Companion of the Order of the Bath (CB) ====
===== Military Division =====
Royal Navy

- Rear-Admiral Sir John Charles Dalrymple-Hay Bt
- Rear-Admiral Charles Farrel Hillyar
- Staff-Captain William Trickett Wheeler
- Captain Edward Augustus Inglefield
- Captain Edward Tatham
- Captain George Granville Randolph
- Captain Charles Joseph Frederick Ewart
- Captain Robert Hall
- Captain Octavius Cumberland
- Captain George William Preedy CB (Civil)
- Captain George Le Geyt Bowyear
- Captain John Corbett
- Captain David Craigie
- Captain John Edmund Commerell VC CB (Civil)
- Captain William Everard Alphonso Gordon

Army

- General Henry Ivatt Delacombe, Royal Marine Light Infantry
- General John Tatton Brown, Royal Marine Light Infantry
- Lieutenant-General Alexander Anderson, Royal Marine Light Infantry
- Major-General George Colt Langley, Royal Marine Light Infantry
- Colonel Charles Cameron Shute, 4th Dragoon Guards
- Colonel Thomas Hook Pearson
- Colonel Lawrence Fyler, 12th Lancers
- Colonel Robert William Disney Leith
- Colonel Henry James Stannus, 20th Hussars
- Colonel Henry Forster, Royal Artillery
- Colonel Henry Garner Rainey
- Colonel Joseph Edwin Thackwell
- Colonel Lawrence Shadwell
- Colonel George Frederick Stevenson Call, 18th Regiment
- Colonel Henry Poole Hepburn, Scots Fusilier Guards
- Colonel John Christopher Guise VC
- Colonel John Hynde King, Grenadier Guards
- Colonel Horace William Montagu, Royal Engineers
- Colonel the Honourable Henry Hugh Clifford VC
- Colonel William Templer Hughes, Bengal Army
- Colonel Doveton Hodson, Madras Army
- Colonel Henry Hope Crealock
- Colonel Joseph Lyon Barrow, Royal Artillery
- Colonel Charles Cureton, Bengal Army
- Colonel the Honourable Percy Robert Basil Feilding, Coldstream Guards
- Colonel the Honourable David McDowall Fraser, Royal Artillery
- Colonel John Patrick Redmond, 61st Regiment
- Colonel William Hardy, Depot Battalion
- Colonel Pearson Scott Thompson, 14th Hussars
- Colonel Charles Loudon Barnard, Royal Marine Artillery
- Colonel Henry Peel Yates, Royal Artillery
- Colonel John Edward Michell, Royal Artillery
- Colonel Charles Hodgkinson Smith, Royal Artillery
- Colonel Nathaniel Octavius Simpson Turner, Royal Artillery
- Colonel Thomas Raikes, 102nd Regiment
- Colonel Charles William Adair, Royal Marine Light Infantry
- Colonel Richard Bulkeley Prettejohn, 18th Hussars
- Colonel Alfred William Lucas, Bombay Army
- Colonel Henry William Holland, Bombay Army
- Colonel Henry Andrew Sarel, 17th Lancers
- Lieutenant-Colonel James Farrell Pennycuick, Royal Artillery
- Lieutenant-Colonel Frederick Robert Mein, 94th Regiment
- Lieutenant-Colonel Robert William Harley, 3rd West India Regiment
- Lieutenant-Colonel Charles Brisbane Ewart, Royal Engineers
- Lieutenant-Colonel Thomas James, Bengal Army
- Lieutenant-Colonel Alexander Mackenzie, 78th Regiment
- Major Trevenen James Holland, Bombay Army
- Inspector-General of Hospitals and Fleets George Burn
- Inspector-General of Hospitals George Stewart Beatson
- Deputy Inspector-General of Hospitals Hampden Hugh Massy
- Staff Surgeon-Major George Saunders

===== Civil Division =====
- Lieutenant-Colonel Andrew Clarke, Royal Engineers, Director of Engineering and Architectural Works under the Board of Admiralty
- John Grant Stewart Inspector-General of Hospitals and Fleets
- Thomas Baker, late Chief Inspector of Machinery, Royal Navy
- The Reverend Robert Mills Inskip, Chief Naval Instructor of Her Majesty's Training Ship Britannia for Naval Cadets
- Andrew Murray, Surveyor of Factories and Consulting Engineer, Royal Navy
- James Scott Robertson, Purveyor-in-Chief to the Army
- Henry Tatum, Principal Superintendent of Stores
- Penrose Goodchild Julyan, Assistant Commissary-General

=== The Most Exalted Order of the Star of India ===
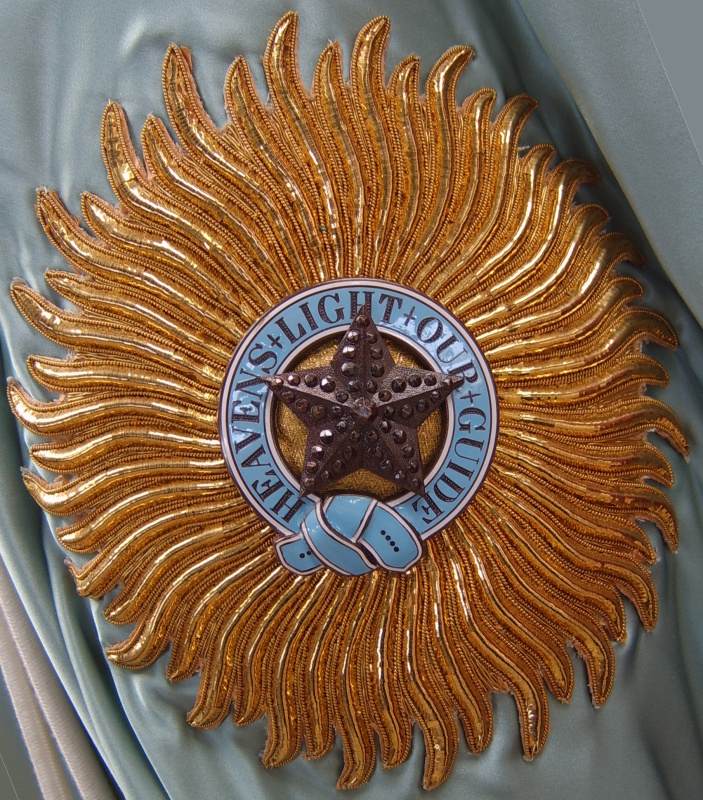
Star of a Knight Grand Commander of the Most Exalted Order of the Star of India

==== Knight Grand Commander (GCSI) ====
- The Rana of Dholepore

==== Knight Commander (KCSI) ====
- His Highness the Rajah of Cochin
- Lieutenant-General John Campbell CB Madras Army
- Major-General George Le Grand Jacob CB late Bombay Army

==== Companion (CSI) ====
- Major-General Henry Renny, formerly in command of Her Majesty's 81st Regiment in the Punjab
- Syud Ahmed Khan, late Principal Sudder Ameen, Allyghur, Bengal
- Henry Charles Hamilton, Bengal Civil Service (Retired), late Chief Civil Officer and Government Agent at Ghazeepore during the Mutinies 1857–1858
- Cowasjee Jehanghier, of Bombay
- Richard Pryce Harrison, Bengal Civil Service (Retired), late Controller-General of Accounts, Bengal
- Colonel George Samuel Montgomery, Bombay Army, Brigadier-General, Commanding the Forces at Neemuch, sometime in command of Police in Upper Scinde
- Major Henry Court, Bengal Civil Service, Commissioner at Allahabad
- Colonel John Blick Spurgin, 102nd Regiment Madras Fusiliers
- Colonel Edward Arthur Henry Webb, Madras Staff Corps
- Colonel William George Woods, Madras Staff Corps, late Adjutant-General of the Madras Army
- William James Money, Bengal Civil Service
- George Nelson Barlow, Bengal Civil Service, Magistrate and Collector of Pooree, in Orissa, during the famine of 1866
- John William Shaw Wyllie, Bombay Civil Service (Retired), late Under-Secretary to the Government of India, Foreign Department
- Lieutenant-Colonel George Hutchinson, Bengal Staff Corps, Inspector-General of the Punjab Police
- Captain Edward Thompson, Bengal Staff Corps, Deputy Commissioner in Oude
- Major William Dickinson, Bombay Staff Corps, Second in command of the 3rd Regiment Scinde Horse, sometime Acting Political Agent in Baloochistan
- John F. Arthur late Surgeon-Major, Madras Medical Department
- Captain Meadows Taylor, late Deputy-Commissioner Hyderabad assigned Districts
- Richard Vicars Boyle
- Meer Akbar Ali, of Hyderabad, in the Deccan, late of the Intelligence Department, Abyssinian Field Force

=== The Most Distinguished Order of Saint Michael and Saint George ===
Star of the Order of Saint Michael and Saint George

==== Knight Grand Cross of the Order of St Michael and St George (GCMG) ====
- The Right Honourable Earl of Derby KG sometime one of Her Majesty's Principal Secretaries of State having the Department of War and Colonies
- The Right Honourable Earl Grey KG sometime one of Her Majesty's Principal Secretaries of State having the Department of War and Colonies
- The Right Honourable Earl Russell KG sometime one of Her Majesty's Principal Secretaries of State having the Department of War and Colonies

Colonial Office

- The Right Honourable Viscount Monck, late Governor-General of the Dominion of Canada, and Captain-General and Governor-in-Chief of the Island of Prince Edward

==== Knight Commander of the Order of St Michael and St George (KCMG) ====
- Paul Edmund de Strzelecki CB
- The Right Honourable Baron Lyttelton, sometime Under Secretary of State for War and Colonies
- The Right Honourable Frederick Peel, sometime Under Secretary of State for War and Colonies
- The Right Honourable Charles Bowyer-Adderley, late Under Secretary of State for the Colonies
- Sir Frederic Rogers Bt Under Secretary of State for the Colonies
- Sir Hercules George Robert Robinson Kt Governor and Commander-in-Chief of the Island of Ceylon
- Alexander Tilloch Galt, late Minister for Finance in the Dominion of Canada
- Henry Taylor, of the Colonial Department
- Thomas Frederick Elliot, late Assistant Under Secretary of State for the Colonies

Colonial Office

- Francis Hincks CB late Governor and Commander-in-Chief of the Colony of British Guiana
- James Walker CB Governor and Commander-in-Chief of the Bahama Islands
- Major-General Charles Hastings Doyle, Lieutenant-Governor of the province of Nova Scotia, in the Dominion of Canada

==== Companion of the Order of St Michael and St George (CMG) ====
- George Macleay, of New South Wales

Colonial Office

- Charles Cowper, late Chief Minister of the Government of New South Wales
- William Charles Gibson, late Colonial Secretary of the Island of Ceylon
- Felix Bedingfeld, late Colonial Secretary for the Island of Mauritius
- John Bayley Darvall, late Attorney-General of the Colony of New South Wales
- John Sealey, Attorney-General of the Island of Barbados
- John Lucie-Smith, Attorney-General of the Colony of British Guiana
- Thomas Skinner, late Civil Engineer and Commissioner of Roads for the Island of Ceylon
- Theophilus Shepstone, Secretary for Native Affairs in the Colony of Natal
- Ferdinand Mueller MD, Government Botanist for the Colony of Victoria
