= General Shirley =

General Shirley may refer to:

- Horatio Shirley (1805–1879), British Army general
- Sir Thomas Shirley, 1st Baronet (1727–1800), British Army lieutenant general
- William Shirley (1694–1771), British Army lieutenant general
