= Battle of Sidon =

Battle of Sidon may refer to the following battles at Sidon in modern-day Lebanon:

- Battle of Sidon (1840), Egyptian–Ottoman War (1839–1841)
- Battle of Sidon (1941), Syria–Lebanon campaign of World War II
- Battle of Sidon (1991), Lebanese Civil War
- 2013 Sidon clash, Syrian civil war spillover in Lebanon
