= The Whim =

The Whim is a play written by Eglantine Wallace in 1795. The play was banned under the Licensing Act 1737 and never performed. It was published that same year with an indignant subtitle and went into a second edition:

With an address to the public, upon the arbitrary and unjust aspersion of the licenser against its political sentiments. Offered to be acted for the benefit of the Hospital and Poor of the Isle of Thanet, but refused The Royal Licence.

== Overview ==
The Whim is set in 18th-century English society on the estate of Lord Crotchett--a wealthy noble who decides on a whim to host an ancient Roman event known as the Feast of Saturnalia. The Feast challenges existing social structures by inverting the roles of nobility and the servant class. Wallace's upturning of the social hierarchy may have prompted the ban, given political sensitivities during the period that saw both the American and the French revolutions.

== Plot ==
During the Feast of Saturnalia, Lord Crotchett temporarily forfeits his position as master of his estate and takes on the role of a servant. Nell and Fag, two actual servants, are put in charge of the estate for the day. The play follows events as they unfold and culminate in a marriage between Maria, the head maid, and Caesar, a disguised noble. While Lord Crotchett does not consent to the marriage initially, he ultimately permits and even condones it as he does not have the power to deny Fag or Nell within the up-side-down social structure of the Feast.

== Criticism and interpretation ==
Many theatre historians have argued that the censorship of Wallace's The Whim highlights the ongoing impact of the Licensing Act 1737. Historians also argue that the censoring of this play demonstrates the excessive power of the Examiner of Plays and the negative impact that office had on late 18th-century British theatre, effectively sterilizing productions of any potentially critical political themes or alignments.

== Bibliography ==
- The whim, a comedy, in three acts. By Lady Wallace. With an address to the public, upon the arbitrary and unjust aspersion of the licenser against its political sentiments. Offered to be acted for the benefit of the Hospital and Poor of the Isle of Thanet, but refused The Royal Licence. London: printed by W. Epps; and sold by S. and J. Reed, No. 26, St. James's Street, London, 1795.
