= 88th Regiment of Foot (Connaught Rangers) =

88th Regiment of Foot (The Connaught Rangers)
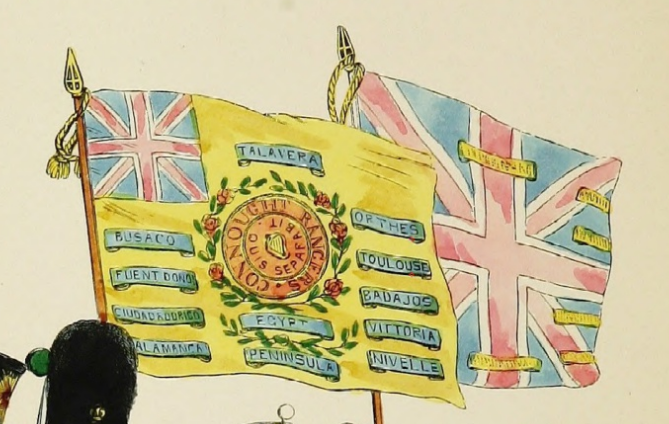
- Regimental Colours
- Active: 1793–1881
- Country: Great Britain (1787–1800); United Kingdom (1801–1881)
- Branch: British Army
- Type: Line Infantry
- Role: Line Infantry
- Size: 1 battalions (two battalions 1805–1816)
- Garrison/HQ: Renmore Barracks, Galway
- Nickname: The Devil's Own
- Motto: Quis Separabit ("Who shall separate us?")
- Engagements: French Revolutionary Wars; Napoleonic Wars; Crimean War; Indian Rebellion of 1857

The 88th Regiment of Foot (Connaught Rangers) was an infantry Regiment of the British Army, raised in 1793. Under the Childers Reforms it amalgamated with the 94th Regiment of Foot to form the Connaught Rangers in 1881.

== History ==
=== Formation ===
The regiment was raised in Connaught on 25 September 1793 by John de Burgh, 13th Earl of Clanricarde as the 88th Regiment of Foot (Connaught Rangers) in response to the ongoing War of the First Coalition. The regiment was sent to join the Duke of York's army in the Dutch Republic in summer 1794 as part of the unsuccessful defence of that country against the French army during the Flanders campaign. The regiment embarked for the West Indies in autumn 1795 and, after a difficult voyage, two companies took part in the suppression of Fédon's rebellion in Grenada and the capture of Saint Lucia before returning to England in summer 1796. The regiment then embarked for British India in January 1799 and arrived in Bombay in June 1800. The regiment sailed from India for Egypt in December 1800 for service in the Egyptian campaign, reaching Cairo on the day that the French army in the city surrendered. It arrived back in England in May 1803.

=== Napoleonic Wars ===
A second battalion was raised in Dumfries in November 1805. The 1st Battalion sailed from Falmouth for the Cape of Good Hope in November 1806. The battalion sailed for South America in April 1807 and took part in the disastrous expedition under Sir Home Popham: it saw action in the unsuccessful attack on Buenos Aires in July 1807. Two companies were ordered to remove the flints from their muskets before they went into action which effectively rendered them defenceless. After a lengthy fight the battalion surrendered. Captain William Parker-Carroll remained in Río de la Plata and was well-treated by the Spanish troops. The rest of the battalion, once released, embarked for home and arrived at Portsmouth in November 1807.

The 1st Battalion landed in Portugal in March 1809 for service in the Peninsular War. It formed part of the Portuguese forces commanded by General William Beresford, 1st Viscount Beresford tasked with removing Marshal Jean-de-Dieu Soult from Porto. It held firm at the top of Medellin hill at the Battle of Talavera in July 1809. Then, at the Battle of Bussaco in September 1810, the battalion, under the command of Lieutenant-Colonel John Wallace, together with a detachment of the 45th Regiment of Foot, made a bayonet charge which sent the French troops reeling. Sir Arthur Wellesley, arriving at the scene, said,

Wallace, I never saw a more gallant charge than that just now made by your regiment.

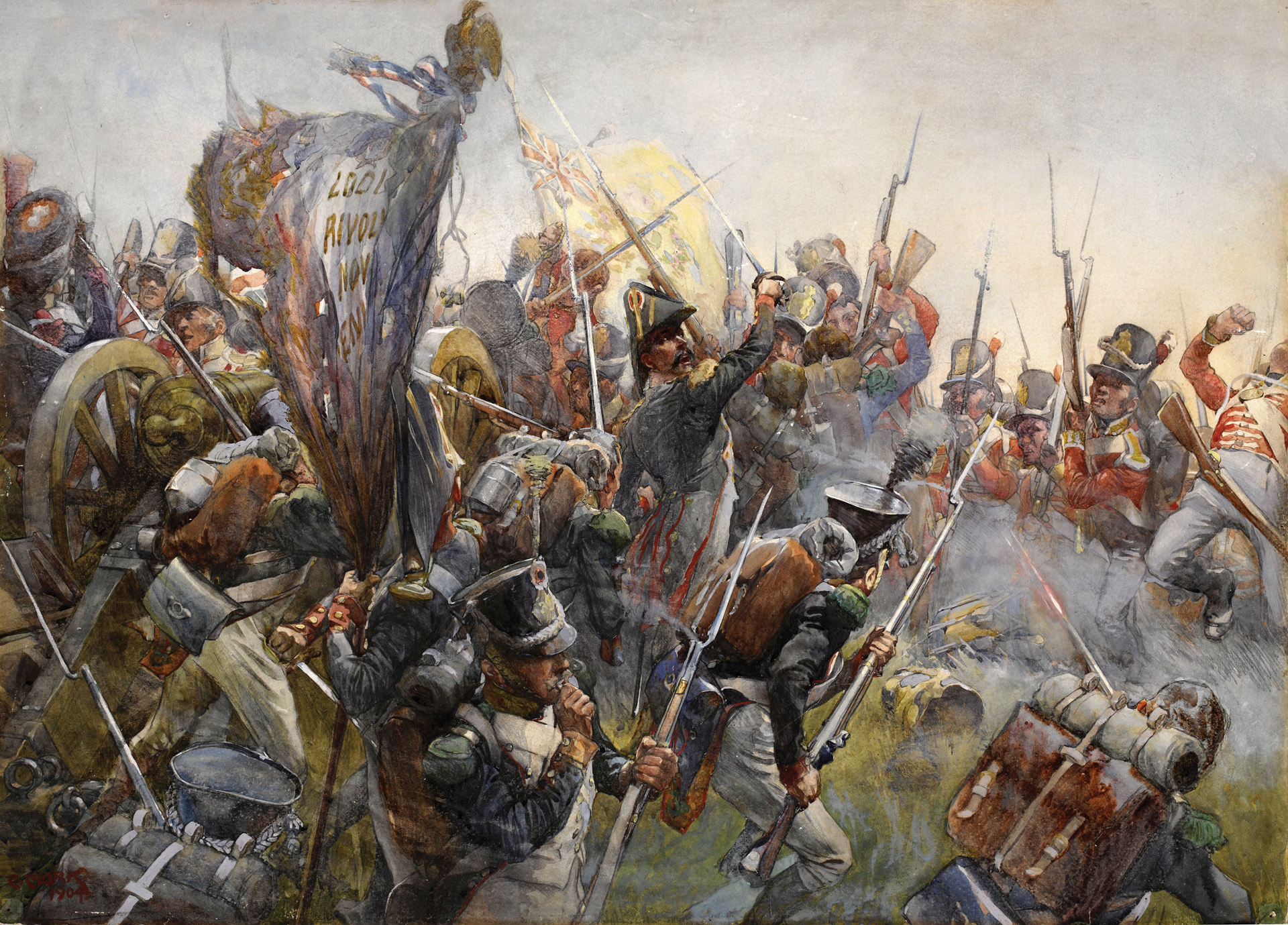
Regimental troops (right) at the Battle of Salamanca

The 1st Battalion then retreated, with the rest of Wellesley's army, to the Lines of Torres Vedras. The battalion, still under the command of Lieutenant-Colonel Wallace made another bayonet charge at the Battle of Fuentes de Oñoro in May 1811 and drove the French Army from the village. It went on to fight at the Siege of Ciudad Rodrigo in January 1812 and scaled the walls of the fortress at the Siege of Badajoz in April 1812. At the Battle of Salamanca in July 1812 the battalion was at the centre of the brigade as it advanced and routed the French troops. At Salamanca the battalion captured an old Moorish standard adorned with crescents and bells: the standard, more correctly known as a Turkish crescent, became known in the regiment as the "Jingling Johnny".

The 1st Battalion also took part in the Siege of Burgos in September 1812 and the Battle of Vitoria in June 1813. It then pursued the French Army into France and fought at the Battle of the Pyrenees in July 1813, the Battle of Nivelle in November 1813 and the Battle of the Nive in December 1813 as well as the Battle of Orthez in February 1814 and the Battle of Toulouse in April 1814. It then embarked for North America in June 1814 for service in the War of 1812. It arrived too late for the Battle of Plattsburgh in September 1814, the last engagement of the war, and so was dispatched to Ostend in May 1815 arriving there in July 1815. It arrived home in spring 1817.

Meanwhile, the 2nd Battalion embarked for Lisbon in summer 1809 for service in the Peninsular War: its only engagement was the Battle of Sabugal in April 1811 before most of it was absorbed by the 1st Battalion in July 1811. One cadre, which returned to the UK, was expanded to battalion strength and was deployed to Ireland before being disbanded in January 1816.

=== The Victorian era ===
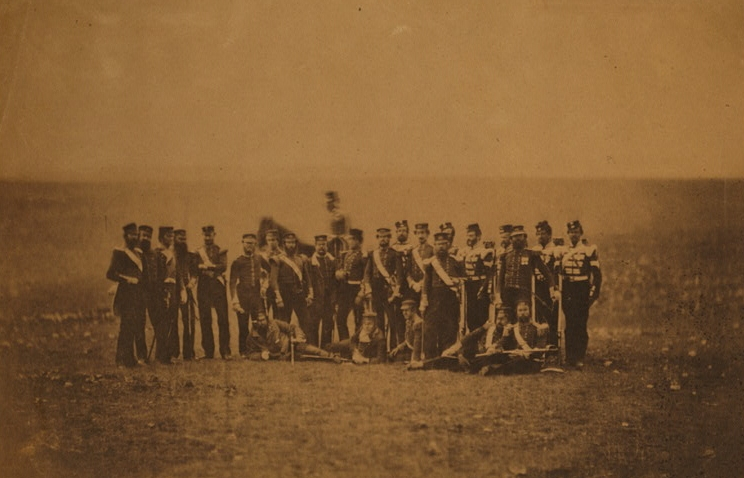
Regimental officers in 1855 during the Crimean War

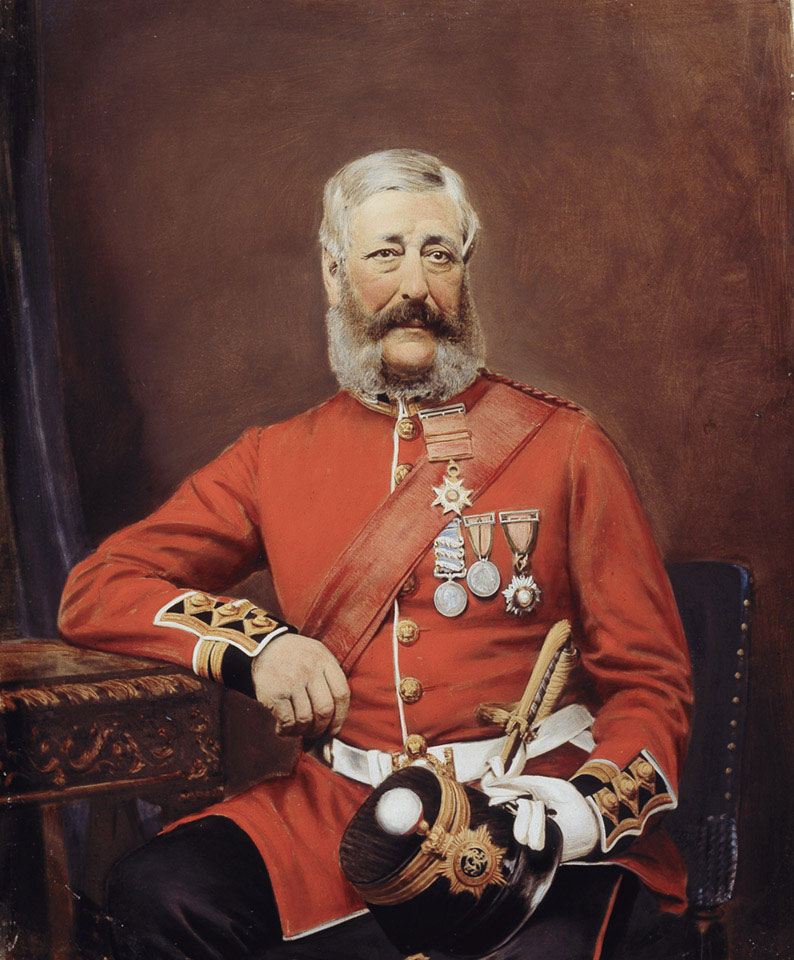
The regimental colonel in c. 1858

The regiment was deployed to the Ionian Islands in late 1825 and returned in July 1836. It embarked for Malta in 1840 and then went on to the West Indies in 1847 and Nova Scotia in 1850 before returning home in 1851.

The regiment was also deployed for the Crimean War and saw action at the Battle of Alma in September 1854, the Battle of Inkerman in November 1854 and the Siege of Sevastopol in winter 1854. Its service in the Crimean War was recognised by the presentation to the City of Galway of a pair of cannons which remain on public display. After the Crimean War, the regiment returned home in 1856 but was deployed to India in 1857 in response to the Indian Rebellion. In November 1870 the regiment boarded the troopship HMS Jumna in Bombay, and commenced the passage home. Nine officers, and 407 non-commissioned officers and men, died in India, mainly from cholera, during the 13 years that the regiment were in India.

The regiment was sent to the Cape Colony in 1877 and served in the Ninth Xhosa War and Anglo-Zulu War before returning to India in 1879. As part of the Cardwell Reforms of the 1870s, where single-battalion regiments were linked together to share a single depot and recruiting district in the United Kingdom, the 88th was linked with the 87th (Royal Irish Fusiliers) Regiment of Foot and assigned to district no. 68 at Renmore Barracks in Galway. On 1 July 1881 the Childers Reforms came into effect and the regiment amalgamated with the 94th Regiment of Foot to form the Connaught Rangers.

== Battle honours ==
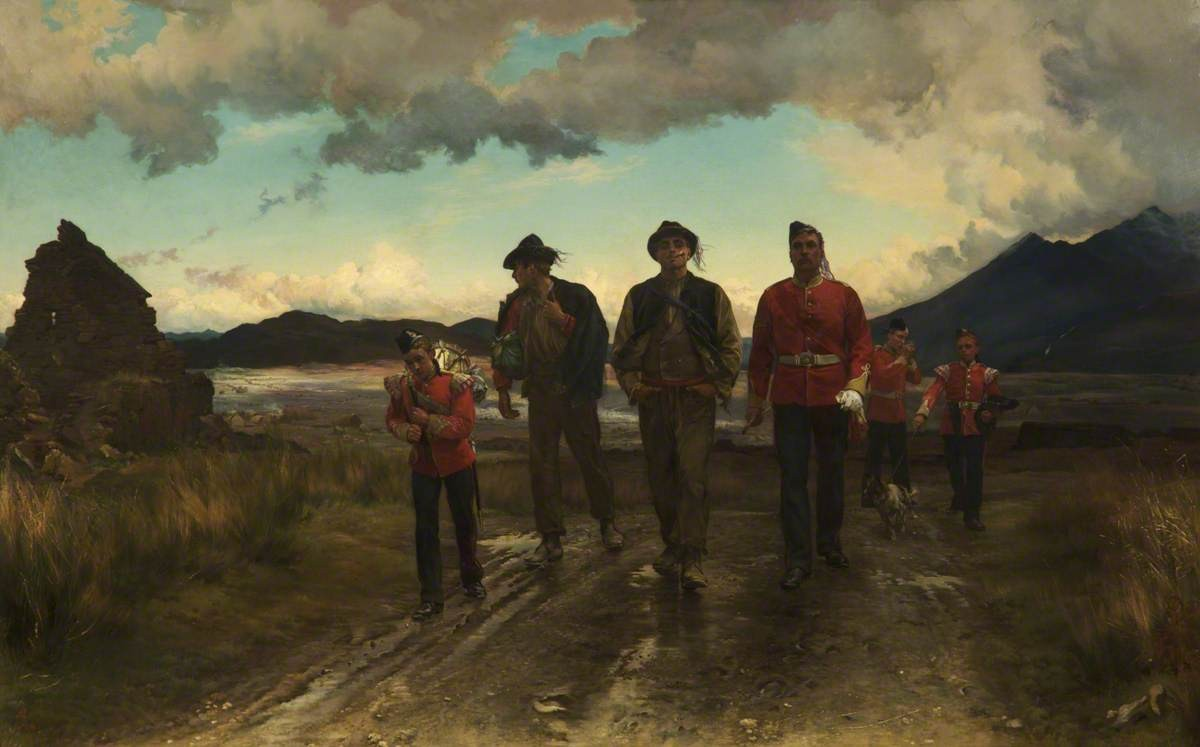
Listed for the Connaught Rangers by Elizabeth Thompson, 1878

Battle honours won by the regiment were:

- Napoleonic Wars: Egypt (sphinx superscribed "Egypt")
- Peninsular War: Talavera, Busaco, Fuentes d'Onor, Ciudad Rodrigo, Badajoz, Salamanca, Vittoria, Nivelle, Orthes, Toulouse, Peninsula
- Crimean War: Alma, Inkerman, Sevastopol
- Central India

== Victoria Cross ==
- Major Hans Garrett Moore, 9th Cape Frontier War (29 December 1877)

== Colonels of the Regiment ==
- Colonels of the Regiment were:
- 1793–1794: Gen. John Thomas de Burgh, 13th Earl of Clanricarde
- 1794–1807: Gen. John Reid
- 1807–1819: Gen. Sir William Beresford, 1st Viscount Beresford, GCB, GCH
- 1819–1824: Gen. Sir Gordon Drummond, GCB
- 1824–1831: Gen. Sir Henry Frederick Campbell, KCB, GCH
- 1831–1857: Gen. Sir John Alexander Dunlop Agnew Wallace, Bt., KCB
- 1857–1858: Lt-Gen. Robert Barclay Macpherson, CB, KH
- 1858–1860: Lt-Gen. Horatio George Broke
- 1860: Gen. Sir George Buller, GCB
- 1860–1863: Maj-Gen. John Cox, KH
- 1863–1864: Gen. Arthur Dalzell, 9th Earl of Carnwath
- 1864–1874: Gen. Montague Cholmeley Johnstone
- 1874–1879: Gen. Sir Horatio Shirley, KCB
- 1879–1881: Gen. William Irwin

== Sources ==
- Cannon, Richard (1838). Historical record of the Eighty-Eighth Regiment of Foot, or Connaught Rangers: containing an account of the formation of the regiment in 1793, and of its subsequent services to 1837. CIHM/ICMH Microfiche. Parker, Furnivall and Parker. OCLC 2378240.
