= Henry Hope Crealock =

British Army general

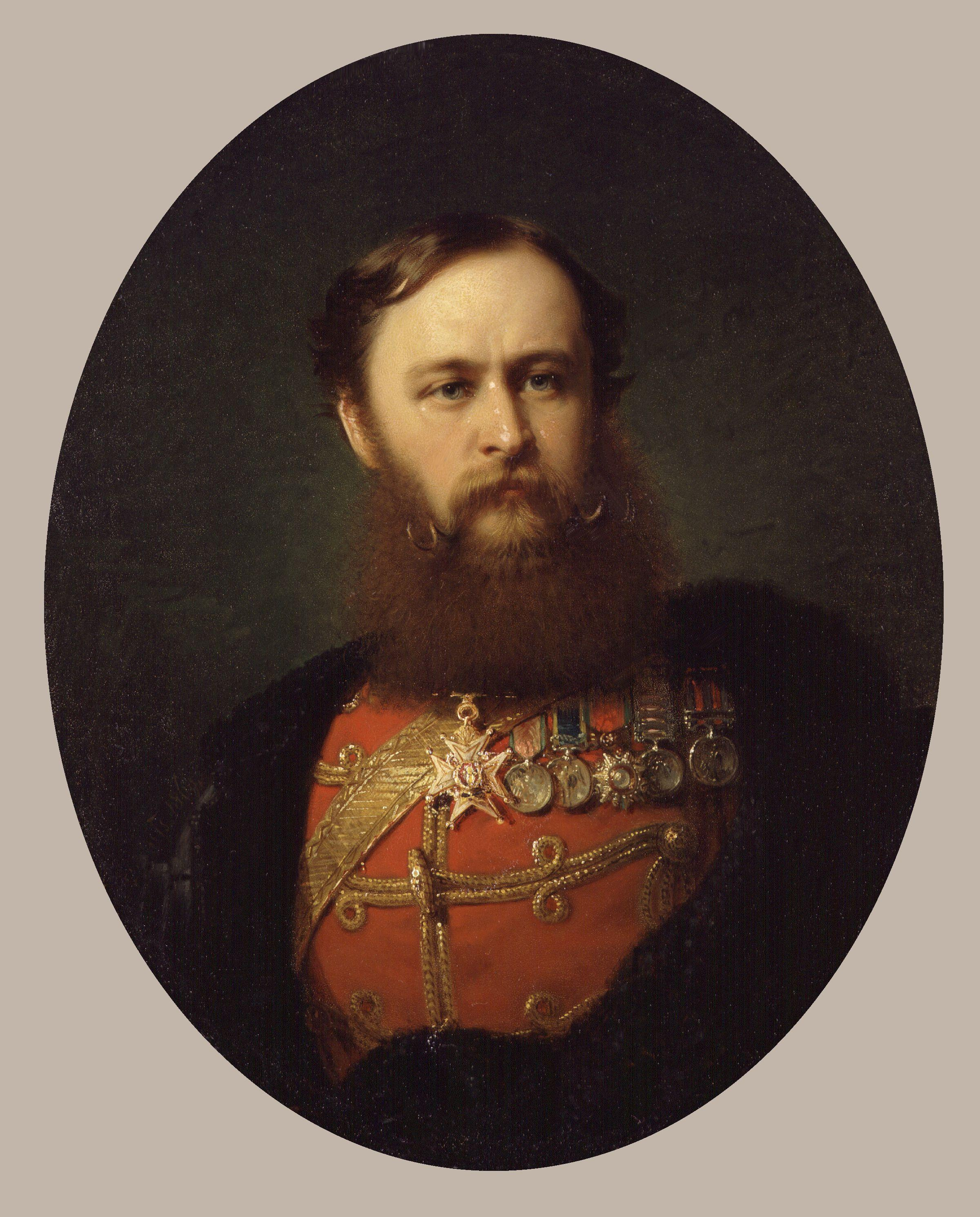
Henry Hope Crealock, portrait by Robert Russ

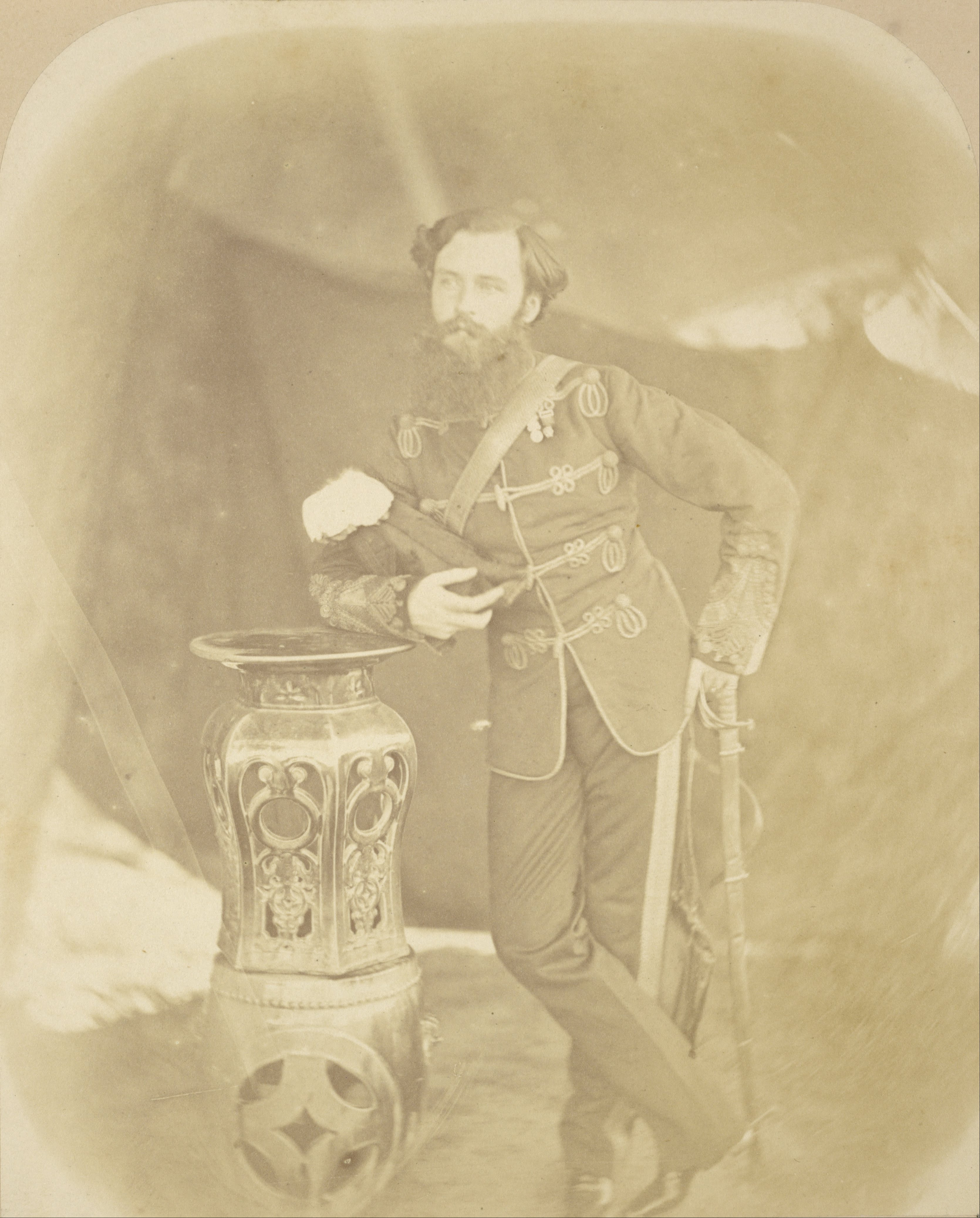
Photograph by Felice Beato, 1858–1859

Lieutenant-General Henry Hope Crealock CB CMG (31 March 1831 – 31 May 1891) was a British soldier, artist, and author.

== Life ==
He was born on 31 March 1831, the second son of William Belton Crealock of Langerton in Devon. Crealock entered Rugby School in February 1844 and purchased a commission in the 90th Light Infantry on 13 October 1848. He purchased his lieutenancy on 24 December 1852, and his captaincy on 29 December 1854.

On 5 December he landed at Balaklava and served at the siege of Sebastopol. He was mentioned in despatches for his gallant conduct during the attacks on the Redan on 18 June and 8 September 1855 and was appointed deputy adjutant quartermaster-general at headquarters on 17 September and at Constantinople in December. For his services, he received the brevet rank of major, the Crimean War medal with 'Sebastopol' clasp, and the fifth class of the Turkish order of the Medjidie.

On 26 December 1856 he attained the substantive rank of major, and in March 1857 he was appointed deputy adjutant quartermaster-general to the China expeditionary force in the Second Opium War. He was present during the operations at Canton in December 1857 and January 1858, and received the brevet rank of lieutenant-colonel and Second China War Medal with 'Canton 1857' clasp.

On 20 July 1858, he purchased the regimental rank of lieutenant-colonel.

He served in the Indian campaigns of Rohilkhand, Biswara, and Trans-Gogra following the Indian Rebellion of 1857, serving during 1858 and 1859 on the staff of Sir William Rose Mansfield. He was present at the actions of Bareilly and Shajehanpur, was mentioned in despatches, and received the Indian Mutiny Medal with 'Central India' clasp.

In March 1860 he was appointed military secretary to Lord Elgin during his Chinese embassy. He was attached to the headquarters of the army during the war that followed; was present at the action of Sinho, the capture of the forts at Tangku and Taku, the engagement at Palichau, and the capture of Pekin; and received the additional 'Taku Forts 1860' and 'Penkin 1860' clasps for his previously-awarded Second China War Medal.

On 6 July 1864 he received his colonelcy, and on 2 January 1870 was gazetted major-general.

During the Austro-Prussian War he was military attaché at Vienna, and from 1874 to 1877 he served as quartermaster-general in Ireland.

In the Anglo-Zulu War he commanded the No.1 Division, and duly received the South Africa Medal (1880) with '1879' clasp.

He was created a Companion of the Order of the Bath in the 1869 Birthday Honours and Companion of the Order of St Michael and St George in 1879.

Crealock retired from the army on 4 September 1884 with the honorary rank of lieutenant-general. He died on 31 May 1891, at his residence, 20 Victoria Square, Pimlico.

== Works ==
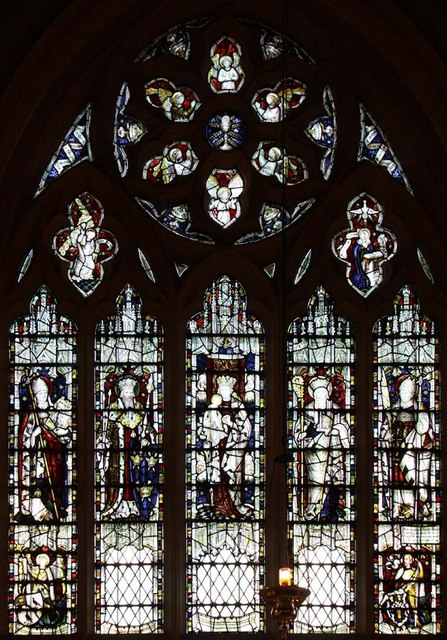
Memorial window by C. E. Kempe in St Peter's in Ely, Cambridgeshire

Crealock was an accomplished draughtsman, who made sketches of scenes in the Indian mutiny and China campaign are valuable records. He furnished many sketches of the Zulu campaign to the Illustrated London News. He illustrated Wolf-Hunting, or Wild Sport in Lower Brittany (1875), and George Whyte-Melville's Katerfelto (1875). In 1885 he republished a series of papers which had appeared between 1870 and 1879 on 'the Eastern question' (London), written from a point of view hostile to Russia. At the time of his death, Crealock was engaged on his work Deer-Stalking in the Highlands of Scotland, which appeared in 1892 under the editorship of his brother, Major-general John North Crealock (1837–1895). The book is profusely illustrated with Crealock's drawings.
