= Horatio Shirley =

General Sir Horatio Shirley KCB (8 December 1805 – 8 April 1879) was a British general of the Victorian era. His disinclination for studies led his family to purchase him a commission in the Rifle Brigade in 1825; in 1833, he obtained a captaincy in the Connaught Rangers. He rose to become lieutenant-colonel commanding that regiment in 1848 and led it to the Crimean War in 1854. During the Siege of Sevastopol, Shirley supervised a successful attack on the Quarries in front of the Great Redan and received the CB and command of a brigade. Wounded in the Battle of the Great Redan, he returned home on leave and commanded troops in Great Britain and Ireland until 1861. Made a K.C.B. and a general in retirement, he became colonel of his old regiment before his death in 1879.

== Education and early service ==
Shirley was the fifth and youngest son of Evelyn Shirley of Ettington Park and his wife Phillis, the daughter of Charlton Wollaston. His eldest brother was Evelyn John Shirley. He was educated at Mr. Davies' school in Streatham and became a student at Rugby School in 1820; however, his mother, in 1821, described him as "a pleasant, droll, active boy, but would never make a scholar." He matriculated on 10 May 1823 at Trinity College, Oxford, where his brother James was a student. True to his mother's prediction, he was "very idle" in college, and she withdrew him in November 1824 to send him into the British Army, in which his brothers Charles and William were officers.

He purchased a second lieutenancy in the Rifle Brigade on 12 May 1825, and joined the regiment on 1 July in Dublin. The Rifle Brigade was ordered to Malta in January 1826; Shirley initially stayed with the regimental depot in Kinsale and then in Tralee, joining the regiment in Malta in September. Shirley purchased a lieutenancy in the Rifle Brigade on 31 October 1826, and was posted with the 1st Battalion in Gibraltar. He was with the regiment in Ireland in 1827, England in 1828, and went with them to Halifax, Canada in May 1829. Aside from a visit to England on leave in autumn 1831, Shirley remained in Canada with the Rifles until 1833.

On 5 July 1833, Shirley purchased a captaincy on the unattached list, and then paid to exchange as a captain into the 88th Regiment of Foot (Connaught Rangers), with whom he would serve for the rest of his active career. He reported to the Rangers' depot at Sheerness on 15 January 1834, and was stationed with them in England and Ireland until 1836, when the regiment was ordered to the Mediterranean. He reached Malta with the regiment on 1 January 1837. The regiment was several years in the Mediterranean, and he took a tour of Greece with several brother-officers in the summer of 1841. He purchased a majority after Ormsby Phibbs purchased the lieutenant-colonelcy of the regiment, on 31 December 1841. In 1847, the regiment was ordered to the West Indies. Shirley was promoted to lieutenant-colonel on 18 January 1848 and took command of the regiment, after Phibbs died of yellow fever in Barbados. The regiment was sent to Halifax in 1850, and returned to England in 1851. Under Shirley's command, the Connaught Rangers showed remarkably good discipline, largely free of crime and drunkenness.

== Crimean War ==
On 2 April 1854, the Connaught Rangers, then quartered in Preston, Lancashire, were ordered to march for Liverpool and take ship for the theatre of war on the Black Sea. At the Battle of the Alma on 20 September, the Connaught Rangers were engaged in the left brigade of the Light Division. Early in the action a Minié ball struck Shirley and became embedded in his prayer book, doing him no harm. As the regiment advanced to support William Norcott with some of the Rifle Brigade and crossed the River Alma, Shirley was ordered by Sir George Buller to have the regiment form square to repel a cavalry attack that never materialised. This allowed part of the 1st Division to overtake them so that the Rangers saw little further action at the battle.

Shirley was brevetted a colonel on 2 November 1854. He commanded the Rangers at the Battle of Inkerman on 5 November. During the Siege of Sevastopol, Shirley, as general officer commanding the trenches, prepared the attack of 7 June 1855 upon the "Quarries", a line of rifle pits lying before the Great Redan. The troops detailed for the purpose from the 2nd Brigade, Light Division, surprised the Russians that evening, successfully took the Quarries, and held them against Russian counterattacks throughout the night and the next morning. Shirley was mentioned in dispatches by Lord Raglan for his conduct of the attack. He was also general officer of the trenches during the unsuccessful attack on the Redan on 18 June, which he did not command. On 5 July 1855, he was rewarded with a grant of £100 p.a. and appointed a Companion of the Order of the Bath, and on 30 July 1855, was given the local rank of brigadier general in Turkey. As a result, he gave over command of the Rangers to Lt-Col. G. V. Maxwell on 14 August to take command of the 2nd Brigade, Light Division.

Though ill aboard ship, he quickly returned to the front when he heard of the plans for another attack on the Redan, and was with the Light Division at the Battle of the Great Redan on 8 September. During the attack, a round shot hit the parapet of the trench directly in front of him and blasted his face with sand and gravel, temporarily blinding him. He did recover his sight, although his face was much battered for some time thereafter. He was again mentioned in dispatches for his service in this battle. He left the Crimea for England, on leave, in October. The town of Bury, where the regiment had been quartered in 1852, had forwarded them a large supply of warm clothing the previous winter, and Shirley presented the town with several Russian military accoutrements by way of a trophy. The armistice of February 1856 supervened before he could return from leave, and the Crimean War ended. He was made an Officer of the Legion of Honour for his services in the campaign, and also received the Order of the Medjidie (3rd Class).

== Postwar career and retirement ==
Shirley was appointed a colonel on the staff in Great Britain on 8 March 1856, commanding troops in Monmouthshire and South Wales. On 8 August 1856, he received the temporary rank of major general while commanding a brigade, later antedated to 24 July 1856; this appointment was to the staff in Ireland, and he commanded five regiments at the Curragh. On 8 August 1861, after five years as a temporary major general, he received the rank of honorary major general. That year he declined an offer to command the British forces in New Zealand, and retired from active service.

After leaving active service, he moved to Dorset, living at Sydling St Nicholas until 1864 and then in Puddletown. He became a substantive major general on 24 October 1862. Shirley was made a Knight Commander of the Order of the Bath in the 1869 Birthday Honours, and on 3 February 1870, he was appointed colonel of the 61st Regiment of Foot.

He was promoted lieutenant-general on 25 October 1871. On 23 September 1874, he was transferred from the 61st to the colonelcy of his old regiment, the Connaught Rangers. Shirley was placed on the retired list and promoted to general on 1 October 1877. He died at his house in Puddletown on 8 April 1879. He was unmarried.

== Bibliography ==
- Shirley, Horatio (1879). Memoir of Sir Horatio Shirley, K.C.B.

Military offices
Preceded by Edward H.D.E. Napier	Colonel of the 61st Regiment of Foot; 1870–1874	Succeeded by Sir Thomas Montagu Steele
Preceded by Montague Cholmeley Johnstone	Colonel of the 88th Regiment of Foot; 1874–1879	Succeeded by William Irwin
