= John Alexander Wallace (British Army officer) =

General Sir John Alexander Wallace KCB
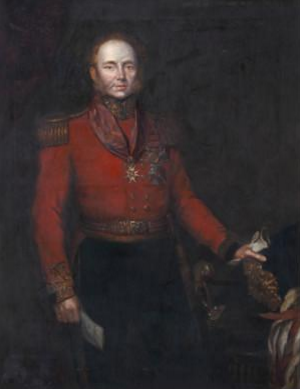
- Born: c. 1775
- Died: 11 February 1857; Stranraer
- Military career
- Allegiance: United Kingdom
- Branch: British Army
- Service years: 1787–1857
- Rank: General
- Commands: 88th Regiment of Foot
- Conflicts: Third Anglo-Mysore War; Siege of Seringapatam; French Revolutionary Wars; Mediterranean campaign; Capture of Minorca; Egypt campaign; Battle of Abukir; Siege of Alexandria; Napoleonic Wars; Peninsular War; Battle of Bussaco; Battle of Redinha; Battle of Casal Novo; Battle of Foz de Arouce; Battle of Sabugal; Battle of Fuentes d'Onoro; Siege of Badajoz; Battle of El Bodón; Battle of Salamanca; Hundred Days
- Awards: Army Gold Medal; Military General Service Medal

General Sir John Alexander Dunlop Agnew Wallace KCB (c. 1775 – 11 February 1857) was a British Army officer.

He was the only son of Sir Thomas Dunlop Wallace, of Craigie, Ayrshire, and his first wife, Eglantine Maxwell. Sir Thomas had been born John Dunlop and adopted the name and style of Baronet Wallace on inheriting the Craigie estate of his grandfather Sir Thomas Wallace, 4th Baronet.

John Alexander Wallace joined the British Army in 1787 as an ensign in the newly raised 75th (Highland) Regiment of Foot. He served with the regiment in India in 1789, became lieutenant in 1790, and took part in Cornwallis's operations against Sultan Tippoo in 1791–2, including the siege of Seringapatam in 1792. He acted as aide-de-camp to Colonel Maxwell, who commanded the army's left wing. In 1796 he obtained a company in the 58th Regiment of Foot and returned to England to join it.

He went with the 58th to the Mediterranean in 1798, was present at the capture of Minorca, and in the campaign of 1801 in Egypt. The 58th formed part of the reserve forces under Lt-General Moore, and was very hotly engaged in the Battle of Alexandria. It came home in 1802.

Wallace was promoted major on 9 July 1803, and obtained a lieutenant-colonelcy in the 11th Foot on 28 August 1804. At the end of 1805, he was transferred to the 88th Regiment of Foot (Connaught Rangers) to command a newly raised second battalion, which was posted to the Peninsular in 1809.

There he joined the first battalion of the 88th, which had suffered in the Talavera campaign, and restored it to be one of the finest corps in the army. It greatly distinguished itself at the Battle of Busaco, where it was on the left of the third division. When the French had gained the ridge and seemed to have cut the army in two, a charge made by the 88th, with one wing of the 45th Foot, drove them down headlong. Wellington, riding up, said, ‘Wallace, I never saw a more gallant charge than that just made by your regiment,’ and made special reference to it in his despatch. Picton, who was with another part of his division at the time, gave Wallace the credit of ‘that brilliant exploit.’

He commanded the 88th at the Battle of Fuentes de Oñoro, and was again particularly mentioned in Wellington's despatch. He was also mentioned in the despatch after the Salamanca, where he was in command of the right brigade of the third division. During the retreat of the army from Burgos, he had a very severe attack of fever at Madrid and was dangerously ill for nearly eight months. He saw no further service in the Peninsula, but commanded a brigade in the army of occupation in France in the latter part of 1815.

He received the gold medal with two clasps, and was made C.B. in 1815. He was made colonel in the army in 1813, major-general in 1819 and elevated to K.C.B. on 16 September 1833. On 20 October 1831 he was given the colonelcy of the 88th, a position he held until his death. He was promoted lieutenant-general in 1837 and full general on 11 November 1851.

He died at Lochryan House, Stranraer, Wigtownshire in 1857 at the age of 82. On 23 June 1829 he had married Janette, daughter of William Rodger, by whom he had five sons and one daughter.

Military offices
Preceded by Henry Frederick Campbell	Colonel of the 88th Regiment of Foot; 1831–1857	Succeeded by Robert Barclay Macpherson
