= Eglantine Wallace =

Scottish author

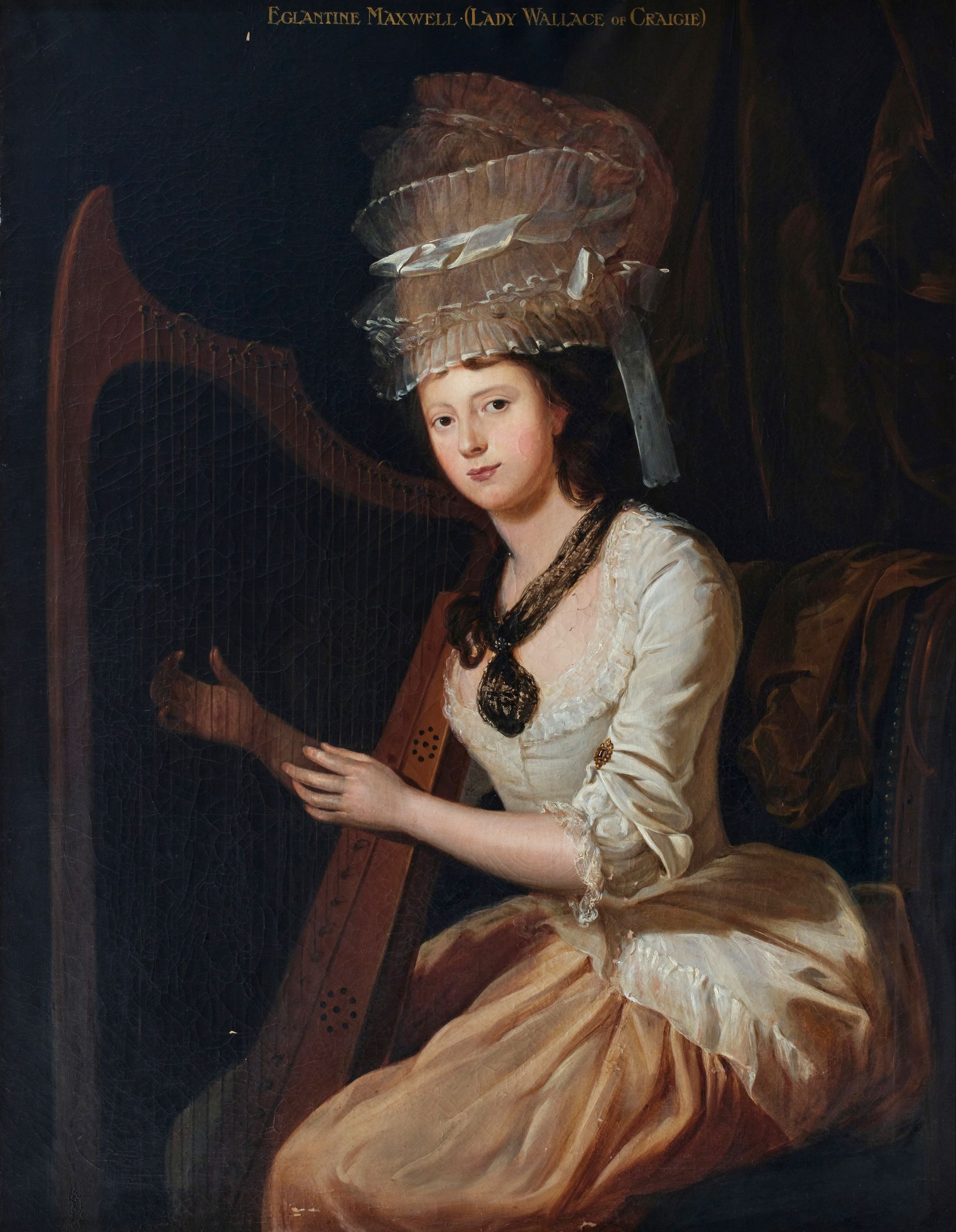
- Born: c. 1754
- Died: 28 March 1803; Munich
- Occupation: Playwright
- Spouse: Sir Thomas Dunlop-Wallace
- Children: 2, including John Alexander Wallace
- Parents: Sir William Maxwell of Monreith, 3rd Bt. (father); Magdalen Blair (mother)

Eglantine Wallace, Lady Wallace (née Maxwell; died 28 March 1803), was an 18th-century Scottish playwright and political commentator. She was the younger sister of society hostess Jane Gordon, Duchess of Gordon and a controversial figure in her own right.

== Biography ==
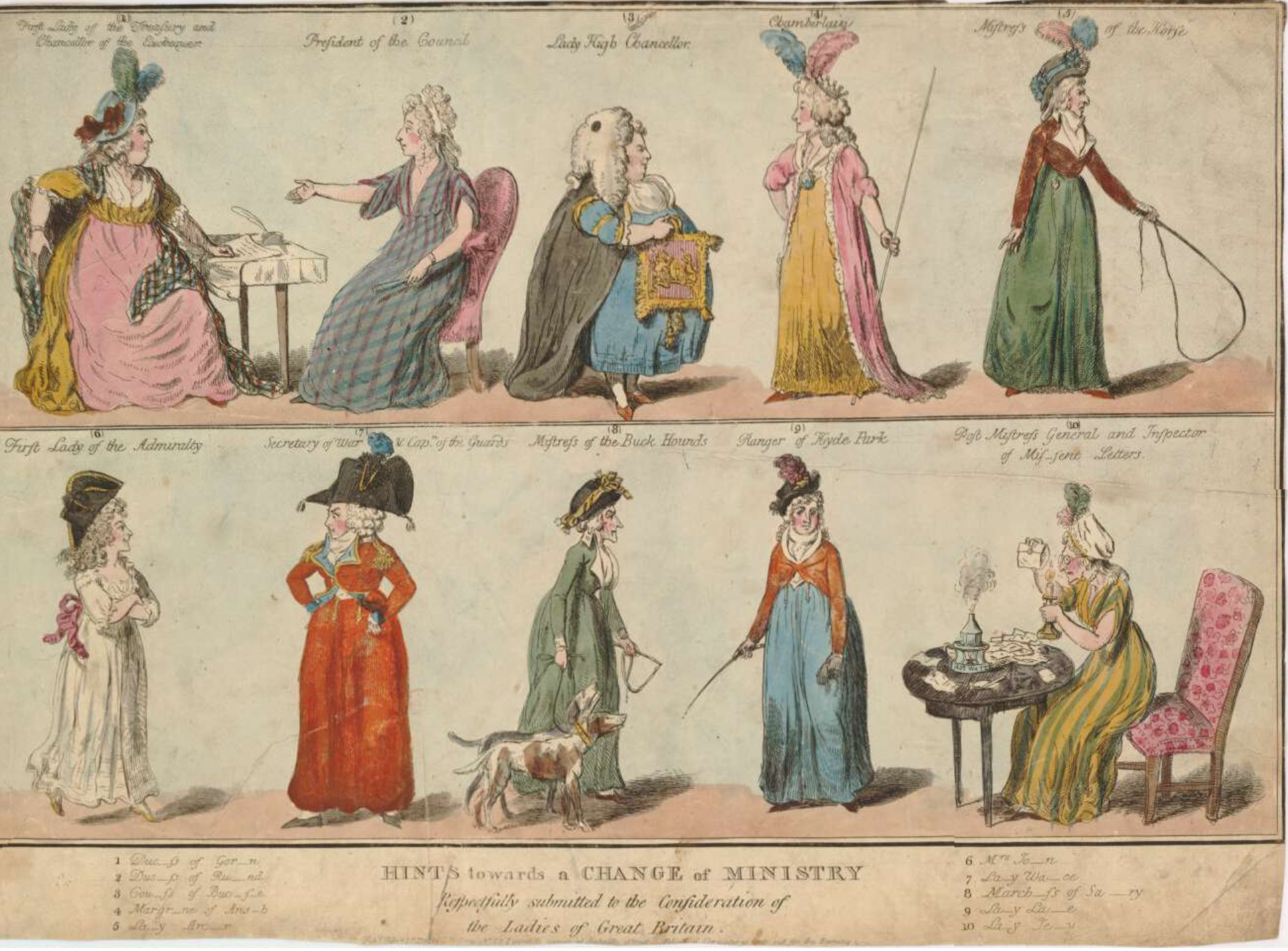
"Hints towards a change of ministry" (London: S.W. Fores, 1797), a satiric print by Isaac Cruikshank, targets 1. Jane Gordon, 2. Mary Isabella Somerset, 3. Albinia Hobart, 4. Elizabeth Craven, 5. Sarah Archer, 6. Dorothea Jordan, 7. Eglantine Wallace, depicted scowling and wearing martial dress, 8. Emily Cecil, 9. Letitia Lade, and 10. Frances Villiers. (British Library)

Wallace was the youngest daughter of Sir William Maxwell, 3rd Baronet, of Monreith, Wigtownshire. According to the Oxford Dictionary of National Biography, she was "[a] boisterous hoyden in her youth, and a woman of violent temper in her maturer years." She was married on 4 September 1770 to Thomas Dunlop, son of John Dunlop of Dunlop and Frances Anna Wallace, the daughter and heiress of Sir Thomas Wallace (1702–1770) of Craigie, fifth and last baronet.

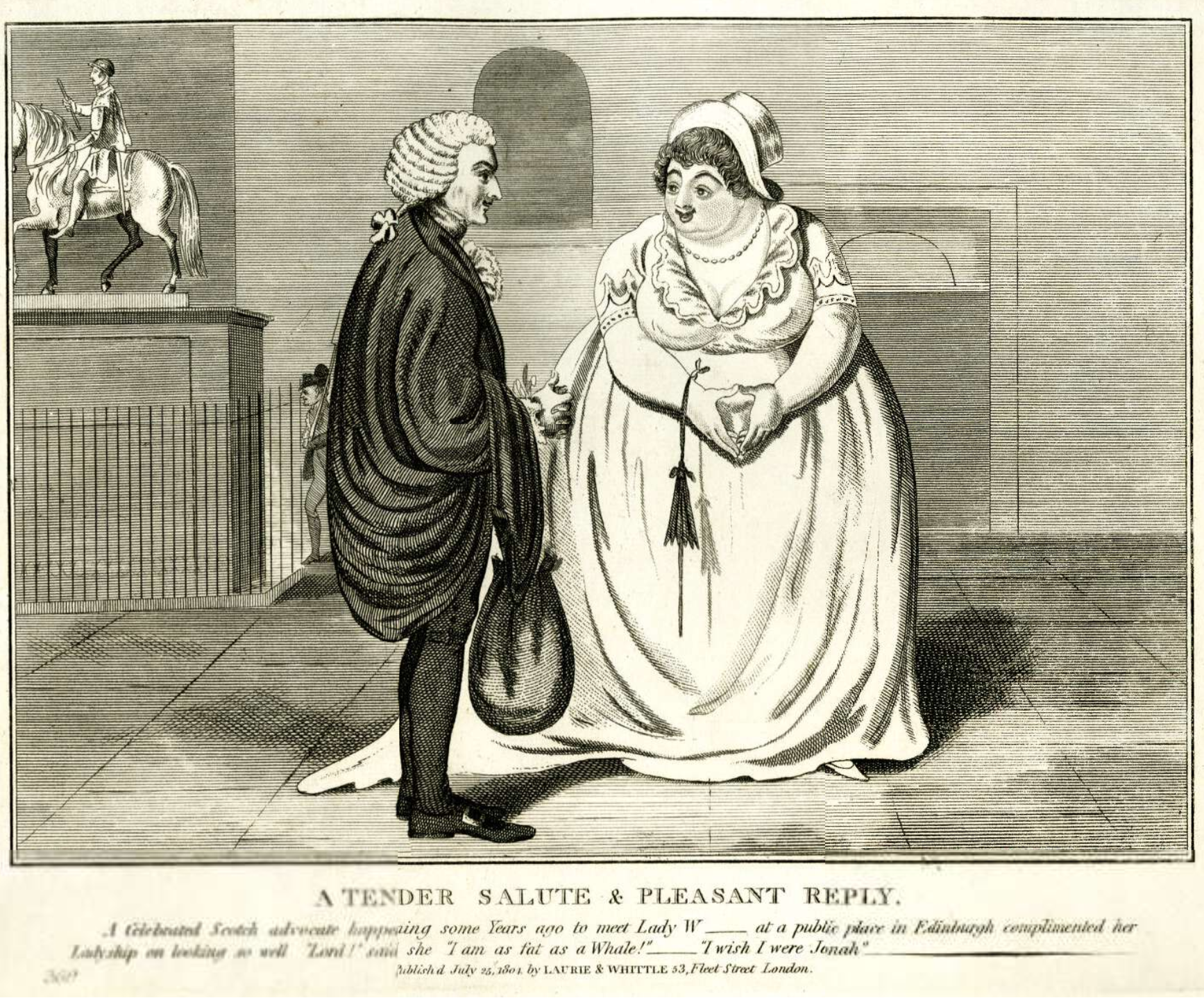
"A tender salute & pleasant reply" (Artist unknown; London: Laurie & Whittle, 1804) apparently satirizes Eglantine Wallace: " 'A Celebrated Scotch advocate happening some Years ago to meet Lady W------ complimented her Ladyship on looking so well "Lord!" said she "I am as fat as a Whale!" - "I wish I were Jonah." - '. (British Library)

On his grandfather's death in 1770, her husband inherited Craigie, took the surname Wallace, and assumed the style of a baronet; however, the property was deeply indebted, and in 1783 he was obliged to sell all that remained of Craigie. It would seem to have been shortly after this that Eglantine Wallace obtained a legal separation, on grounds of cruelty.

A little later Lady Wallace was herself summoned for assaulting a woman—apparently a paid companion—and was directed by the magistrate to settle the matter. Leaving Edinburgh, she relocated to London. Her comedy The Ton; or, Follies of Fashion was produced at Covent Garden on 8 April 1788 with a good cast, but, according to John Genest, the production was "very dull." Reviewers were critical of Wallace's skills, audiences responded poorly, and the play was withdrawn after three performances in London and one failed performance in Edinburgh. Her next play, The Whim (1795), was prohibited from the stage by the Lord Chamberlain and she left England in apparent disgust. In October 1789 she was arrested at Paris as a presumed English agent and narrowly escaped with her life. In 1792 she was in Brussels. There she began a relationship with General Charles François Dumouriez, and while her social standing was apparently unaffected, she was the occasional subject of salacious satires.

She died at Munich on 28 March 1803, leaving two sons, the elder of whom was General [Sir] John Alexander Dunlop Agnew Wallace.

== Selected works ==
- A letter to a friend, with a poem, called The Ghost of Werter. By Lady. London: T. Hookham, 1787.
- Diamond cut Diamond, a Comedy [from the French], 1787. (not produced)
- The Ton; or, Follies of Fashion. A Comedy. As it was acted at the Theatre Royal, Covent Garden. By Lady Wallace.. London: T. Hookham, 1788. (Extext, Internet Archive)
- Letter from Lady Wallace, to Capt. William Wallace, aid de camp to Colonel Maxwell, at Bangalore. London: J. Debrett, 1792. Two editions.
- The conduct of the King of Prussia and General Dumourier, investigated by Lady Wallace.. London: J. Debrett, 1793. (Etext, Internet Archive) Three editions.
- A supplement to The conduct of the King of Prussia, &c. investigated; Observations upon the present state of English politics; and a plan for altering the mode of carrying on the war. Addressed to all ranks of Britons. By Lady Wallace. London: J. Bell, 1794. Two editions.
- Cortes, a Tragedy (?).
- A sermon addressed to the people, pointing out the only sure method to obtain a speedy peace and reform. By Lady Wallace. London: S. and J. Reed, 1794.
- Lady Wallace's address to the Margate volunteers, on the 28th of May, 1795. London: W. Epps, 1795.
- The whim, a comedy, in three acts. By Lady Wallace. With an address to the public, upon the arbitrary and unjust aspersion of the licenser against its political sentiments. Offered to be acted for the benefit of the Hospital and Poor of the Isle of Thanet, but refused The Royal Licence. London: W. Epps, 1795. Two editions.
