= Alexander Anderson (Royal Marines officer) =

British army general in the 19th century

General Alexander Anderson CB
- Born: 7 May 1807
- Died: 21 November 1877 (aged 70); London
- Burial place: Brompton Cemetery
- Military career
- Allegiance: United Kingdom
- Branch: Royal Marines
- Service years: 1823-1877
- Rank: General
- Conflicts: Navarino Bay, Egyptian–Ottoman War (1839–1841)
- Awards: Companion of the Order of the Bath

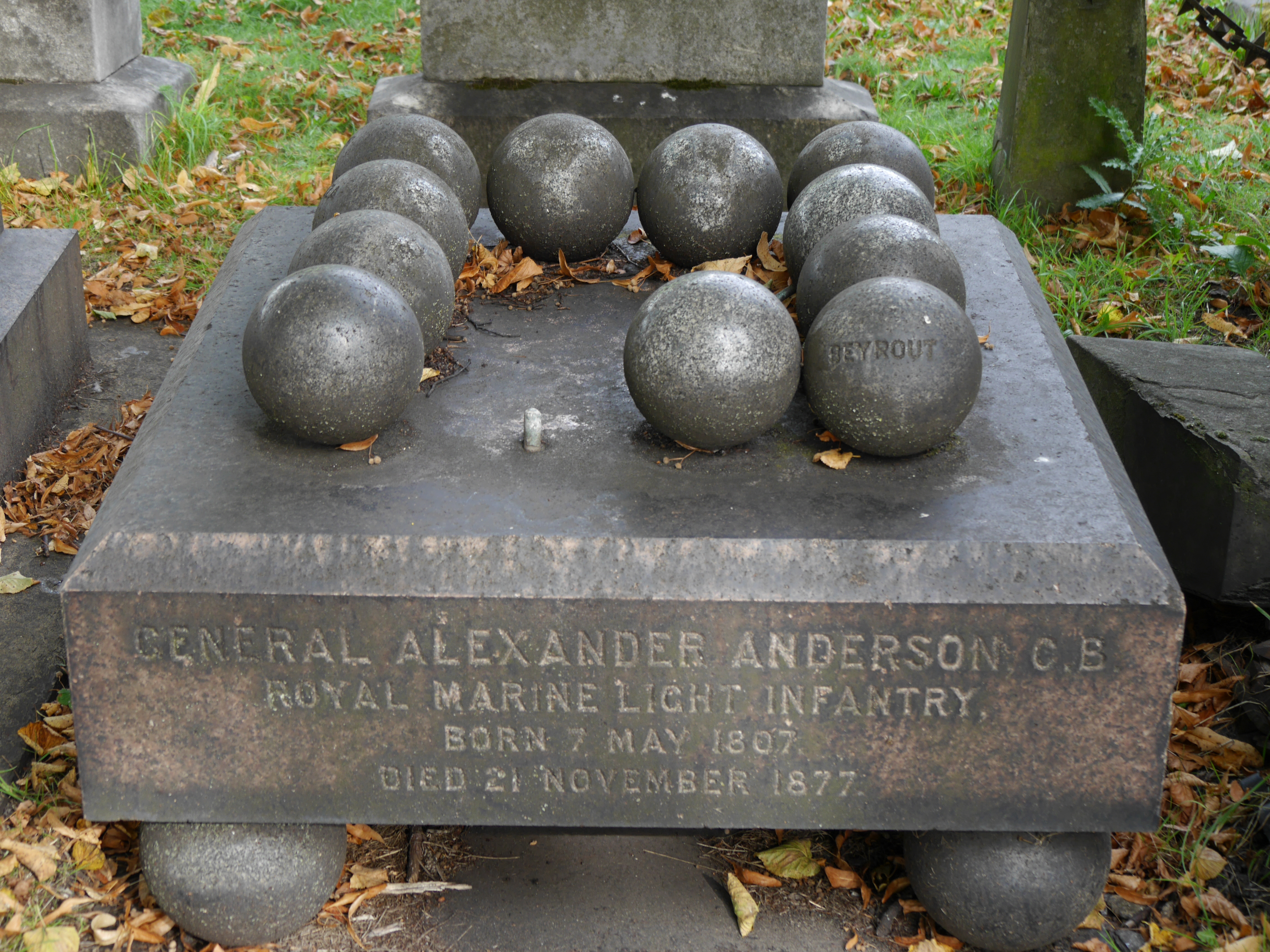
Funerary monument, Brompton Cemetery, London)

General Alexander Anderson CB (7 May 1807 – 21 November 1877) was a senior Royal Marines officer. He served in the Royal Marine Light Infantry and became a Companion of the Order of the Bath.

== Career ==
Anderson was commissioned into the Royal Marine Light Infantry as a second lieutenant on 24 May 1823 at Portsmouth. He served aboard HMS Albion from 1825 to 1827; during this time, the ship supported a British intervention in Portugal, a precursor to the Liberal Wars. On 20 October 1827, Albion formed part of the combined British, French and Russian fleet which defeated Ottoman forces at the Battle of Navarino; during which, Anderson led a boarding party and captured an enemy flag.

In 1840, Anderson participated in the Second Egyptian–Ottoman War, including the Bombardment of Beirut, the Battle of Sidon and the Battle of Acre. For this, he was awarded the Sultan's St Jean d’Acre Medal in silver and the Naval General Service Medal with clasps. He was promoted to Captain in 1842, Major and then Lieutenant Colonel in 1854, Colonel in 1859, Major General in 1862, and Lieutenant General in 1866. In 1869, he was made a Companion of the Order of the Bath, and was promoted to General in 1870. He retired in May 1877, shortly before his death in November of the same year.

== Memorial ==
Anderson is buried in Brompton Cemetery in London. His memorial is an unusual composition of cannonballs, one of which has disappeared. In 2018 the missing cannonball was replaced and the group has been added to. Three of the cannonballs are inscribed, individually bearing the words 'Beyrout', 'Gaza' and 'Syria'. The grave lies on the east side of the main path, midway between the north entrance and the colonnades.
