= St Peter-in-Ely =

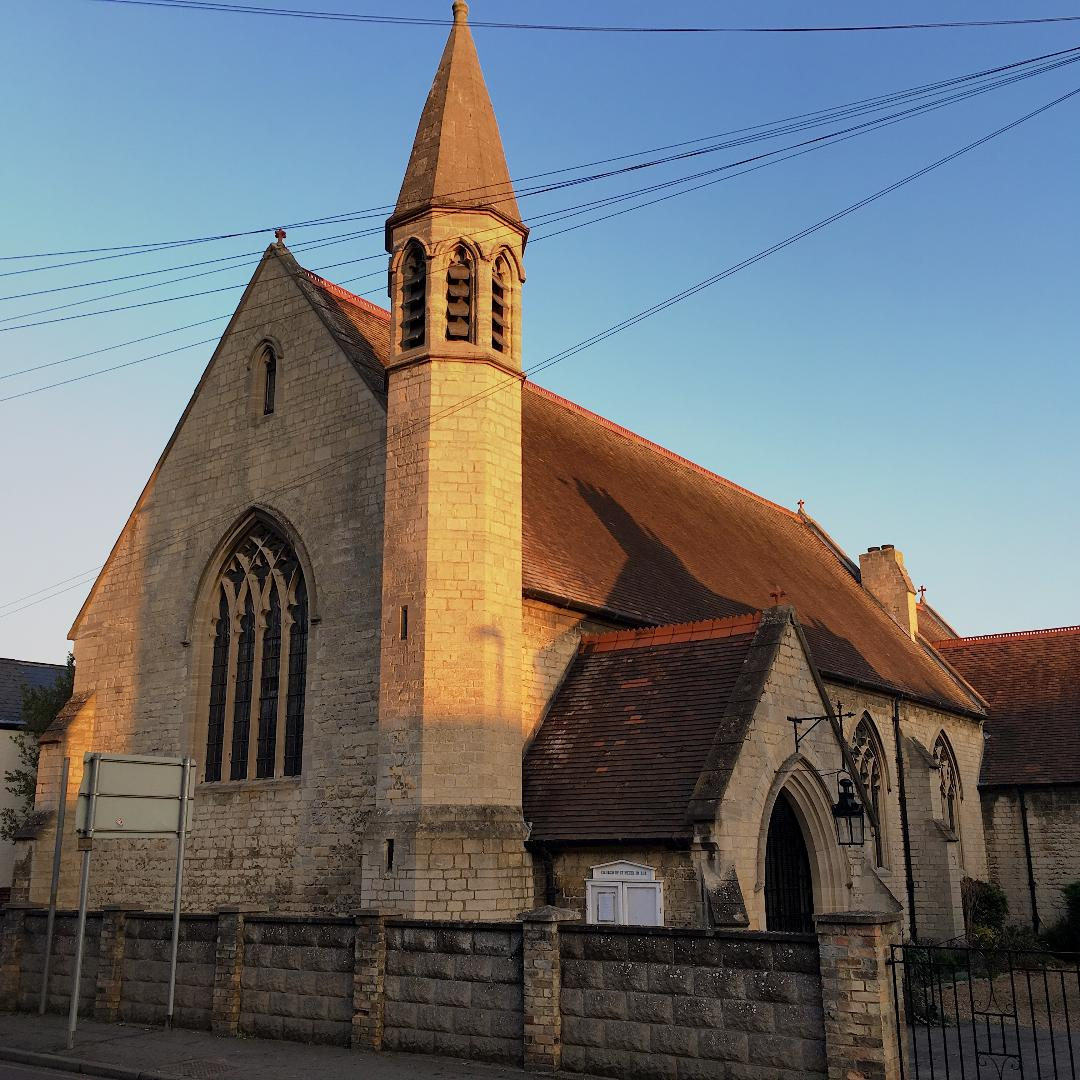

- Location in Cambridgeshire
- 52°23′40″N 0°15′55″E
- Location: Ely
- Country: England
- Denomination: Church of England
- Churchmanship: Anglo-Catholic
- Website: elystpeterschurch.co.uk

History
- Dedication: St Peter
- Dedicated: 1890

Architecture
- Architect(s): James Piers St Aubyn and Henry John Wadling

Administration
- Diocese: Ely

Clergy
- Vicar: Revd. Ann Williams

St Peter-in-Ely or St Peter's Church, Ely, is a Church of England proprietary chapel in Ely, Cambridgeshire, England, located on Broad Street. The chapel is in the Diocese of Ely and follows the Anglo-Catholic or high-church tradition of the Church of England.

It is a stone structure in the Early Decorated Period style and consists of chancel, nave, south porch and south-west bell turret with one bell. The architects responsible are named in a contemporary press report as 'St Aubyn and Wadling of London'. H. J. Wadling attended the dedication service as 'architect'. The east window is a notable work from the studio of Charles Eamer Kempe and there is a wooden screen and rood loft designed by Sir Ninian Comper.

The building opened for worship in 1890 with the intention of ministering to those living and working in Ely's riverside district.

== History ==
In the late 1880s Catharine Maria Sparke, widow of Canon Edward Bowyer Sparke (son of Bowyer Sparke, Bishop of Ely), decided to build a church in memory of her husband, who had been keenly aware of the need for a church for Ely's riverside district. The new church was built at a cost of £5,000 on land that had previously been an orchard. On St Peter's Day 1889 the foundation stone was laid, and on 30 June 1890 the church was dedicated to St Peter by the Bishop of Ely, Lord Alwyne Compton and opened for worship.

Maria Sparke established a trust for the building and establishment of the church and for the provision of a priest or curate, who would be responsible for holding services in accordance with the Doctrines and Liturgies of the Church of England.

As a proprietary chapel, St Peter-in-Ely is owned and administered by the Trustees of St Peter's Church, a registered charity.

== The Kempe window ==
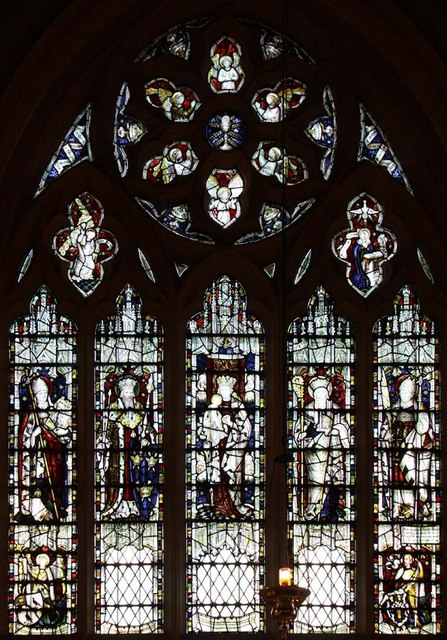
The Kempe window

The five-light east window, dating to 1892, was commissioned from the London studio of Charles Eamer Kempe, by the Revd. Salisbury Price, then a curate of the parish of Ely, Holy Trinity, in which St Peter's had been founded as a mission church. Its central light shows the Virgin Mary with the infant Christ, flanked by two lights: that to the north showing St Edmund, the martyred King of East Anglia; and that to the south showing St Etheldreda, seventh-century foundress of the monastery of Ely. The outermost lights show, to the north, St Augustine of Canterbury; and to the south, the martyred St Thomas Becket, also of Canterbury.

Above the main lights is a representation of the Eucharistic Host, set in the circular centre of a tracery rose window. Around the Host cluster six angels, so to speak within the 'petals' of the 'rose', while, in the spaces between the 'petals' are depicted six lilies, the stem of each shown surrounded by a circlet inscribed with 'Ave Maria'. The Marian theme is reiterated in the outer elements of the tracery, where the acclamation, Gloria tibi Domine/ qui natus es de virgine is seen, written on two scrolls. Panels in the lower tracery specifically depict the Annunciation: Gabriel addresses the Virgin with Ave Maria and she replies with Ecce ancilla Domini. The Holy Spirit is seen descending in the form of a dove. Emanations somewhat resembling ears of corn radiate from the dove, as from the Eucharistic Host placed at the centre of the 'rose'.

At the lowest level of the window we find heraldic art and representations of St Michael and St George flanking three central panels which have been left blank because, originally, damask cloth stretched over a tall frame or board set behind the altar obscured the lower, central part of the window. A very early photograph of the church interior shows this cloth-covered construction still in place. Later removed, it seems from the photographic records of the church never to have been replaced by any more solid reredos. The blank panels now shed bright light on the sanctuary.

The window was dedicated to Lieutenant-General Henry Hope Crealock CB, CMG, who was the uncle who had recently bequeathed a substantial fortune to the Revd Salisbury Price. The representations of St Michael and St George allude to his military honours. Both General Crealock and Salisbury Price are commemorated in the heraldry. The face of St George is a later replacement for the one that figured in the original Kempe glass.

Multi-coloured strapwork forming a border for the main five lights is patterned with alternate leopards' heads and wheatsheaves, motifs taken from the Price and Crealock arms respectively. A wheatsheaf in the bottom left hand corner, later the characteristic mark of Kempe windows, is found here for the first time in a design from his studio.

== The Comper screen ==
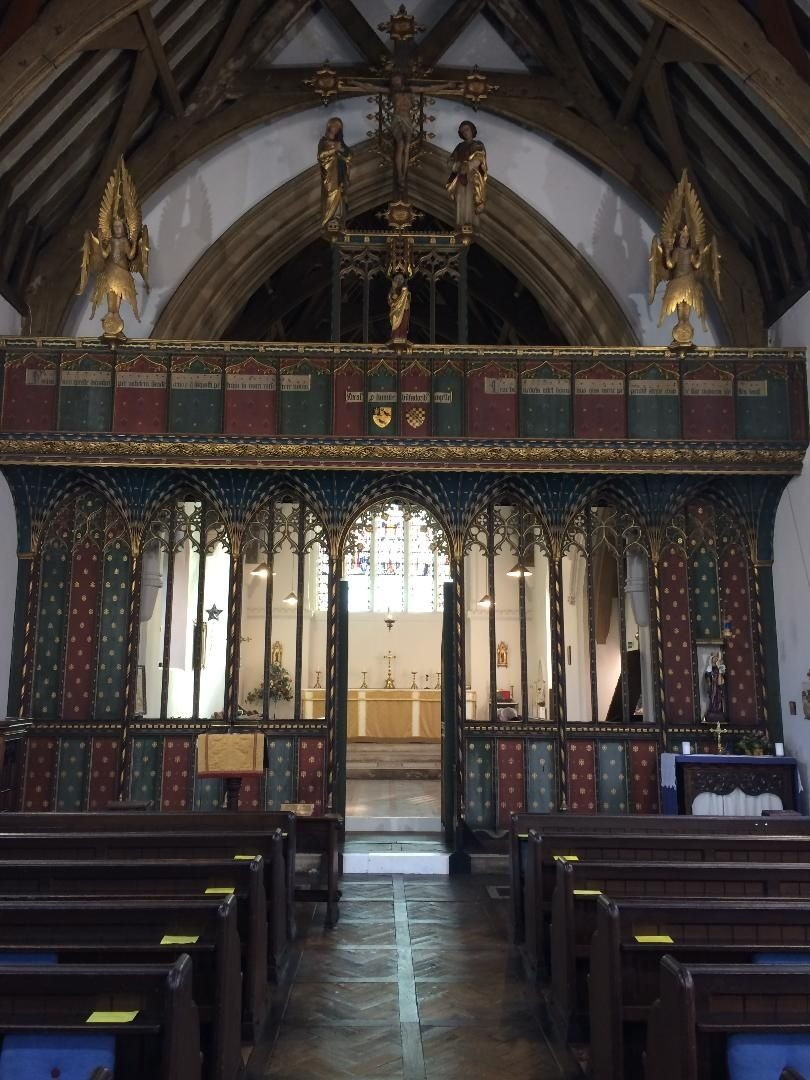
The Comper Screen

It is believed that the Rood Screen at St Peter-in-Ely is one of the earliest major works of Sir Ninian Comper. It dates from 1893 (rather than 1889, as stated in Symondson and Bucknall's standard work on Comper); the evidence for this is a report, dated September 22, 1893, in the Ely Weekly Guardian which tells us that the recent carving and general preparation of the screen was carried out in London, after which it was sent to Ely in sections to be assembled and painted in situ, a task which took more than three months. The screen is said to have been carved from 'Oregon pine'. Like the Kempe window, it was commissioned by the Revd. Salisbury Price.

The arches of the screen support a gallery six feet (1.8 m) wide and a rood. The underpart of the gallery is lavishly carved, richly gilded and painted. The panels of the screen are decorated with stylised flowers, whilst over the central doors are two shields bearing the arms of families who were generous in their gifts to the church: the Upcher and the Sparke families.

The screen contains the Latin inscription Oremus huiusce pro benefactoribus capellae (Let us pray for the benefactors of this chapel) and two antiphons provided for the Feast of Holy Cross according to the Sarum rite, as follows:

- Salva nos, Christe salvator per virtutem sancte crucis qua salvasti Petrum in mari; miserere nobis (Save us, Christ our Saviour by the virtue of the holy cross, through which you saved Peter in the sea; have mercy on us)
- Crux benedicta nitet dominus qua carne pependit, atque cruore suo vulnera nostra lavit (The blessed Cross shines forth, on which the Lord hung in flesh and with his blood washed our wounds).

As explained by the Revd Canon Chris Barber in the church's guide book, Comper was deeply aware of the liturgical significance of his designs and very knowledgeable about their historical context; and thus it is not surprising that in designing a chancel screen with the traditional rood and its supporters, St Mary and John the Apostle, Comper should incorporate the liturgical texts appropriate for the veneration of the Christian cross.

== The Hill pipe organ ==
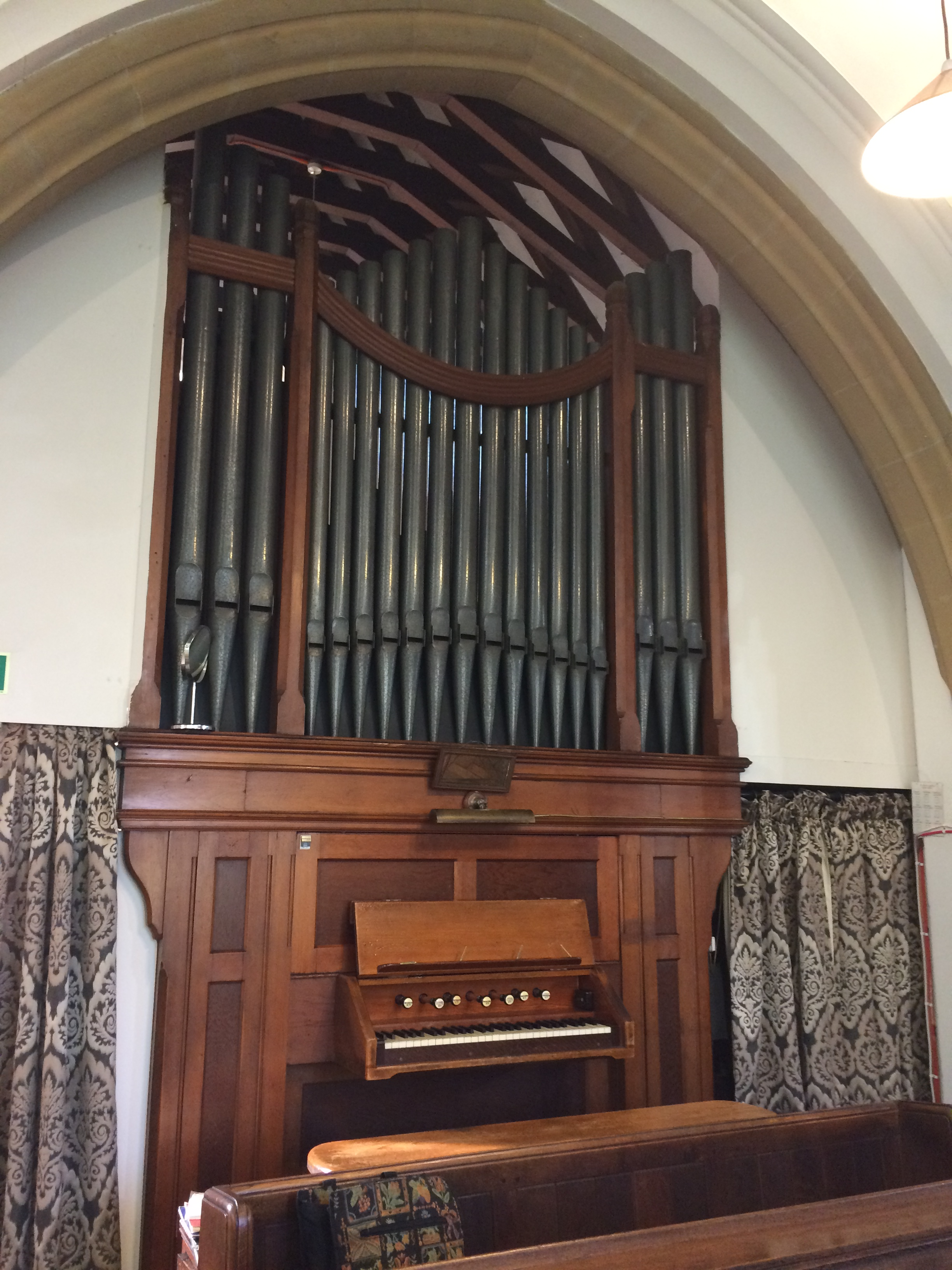
The Hill Organ

The pipe-organ at St Peter's-in-Ely is by William Hill & Son, a very small instrument with only seven stops, a single manual and half a pedal-board. It was the gift of the Upcher family of East Hall, Feltwell, into which Maria Hester, the daughter and heiress of Edward Bowyer and Catharine Maria Sparke, had married. Like the Kempe window and the Comper screen, it was not installed until somewhat later than the church's dedication, although, according to a press report from 1890, it was already promised at that time. Recent research indicates that the organ dates from 1891 and was purpose built for the church. In September 2021, the organ was awarded Grade II status by the British Institute of Organ Studies.

== Services ==
A sung service of Holy Communion is held at St Peter-in-Ely every Sunday at 9.30 am and a said service of Holy Communion is held every Tuesday at 12:00 pm. Evening Prayer is said at 6.00pm on Monday. Some additional services are held during Advent, Christmas, Lent and Easter. A choir augments the congregational singing on the fourth Sunday in the month.

== Gallery ==
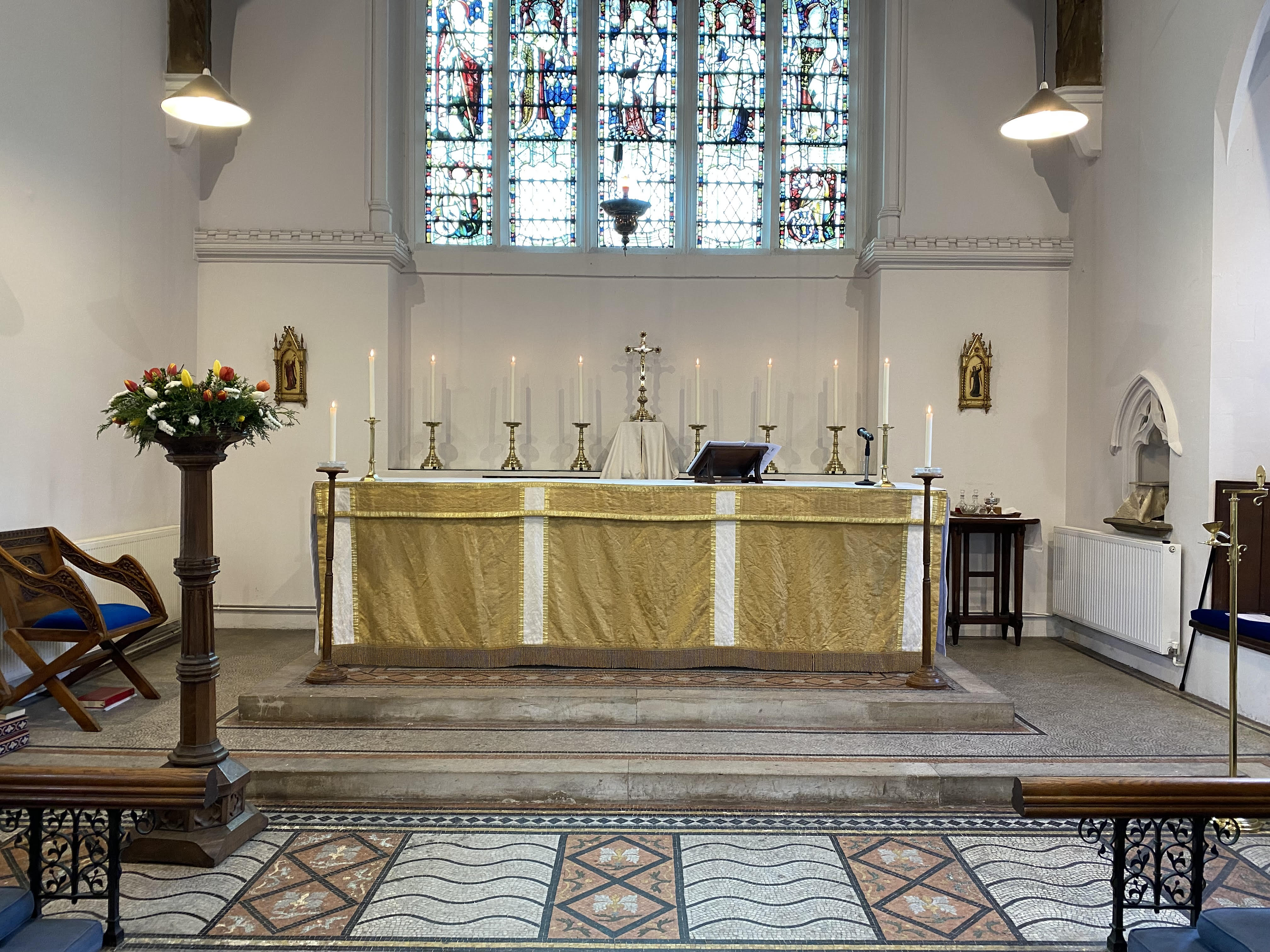
View of the Sanctuary

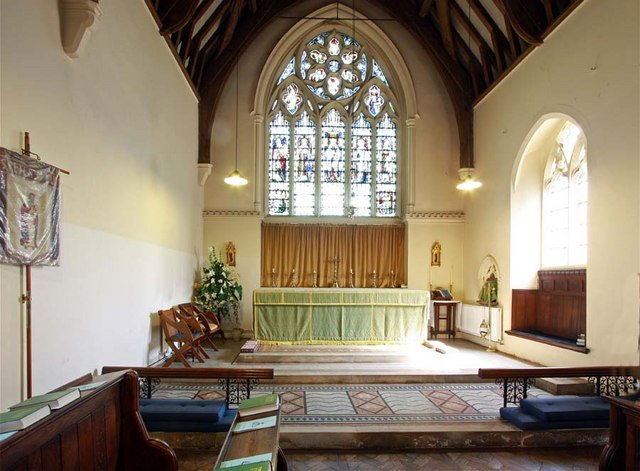
Chancel

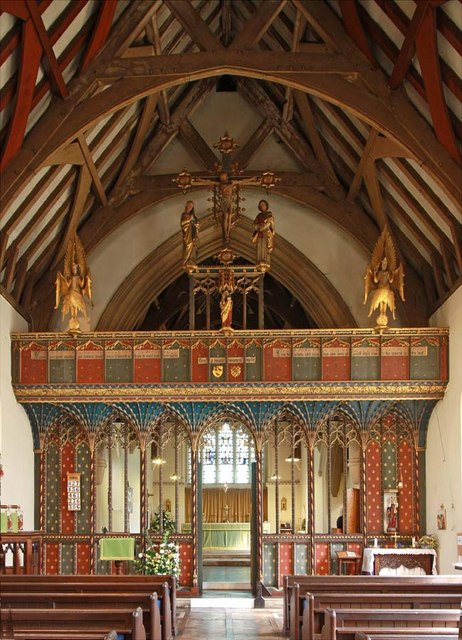
East end

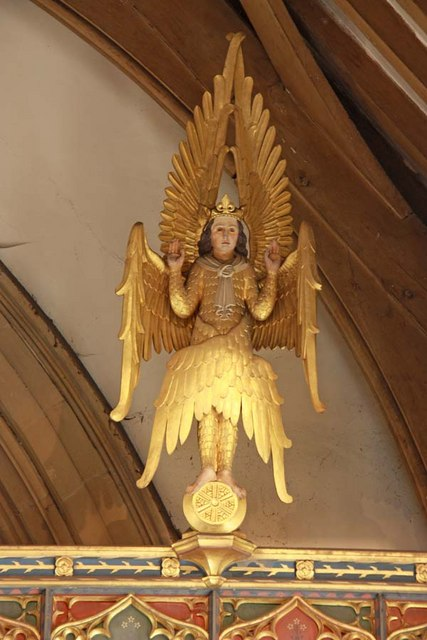
Angel on rood screen
