= George Buller =

General Sir George Buller GCB
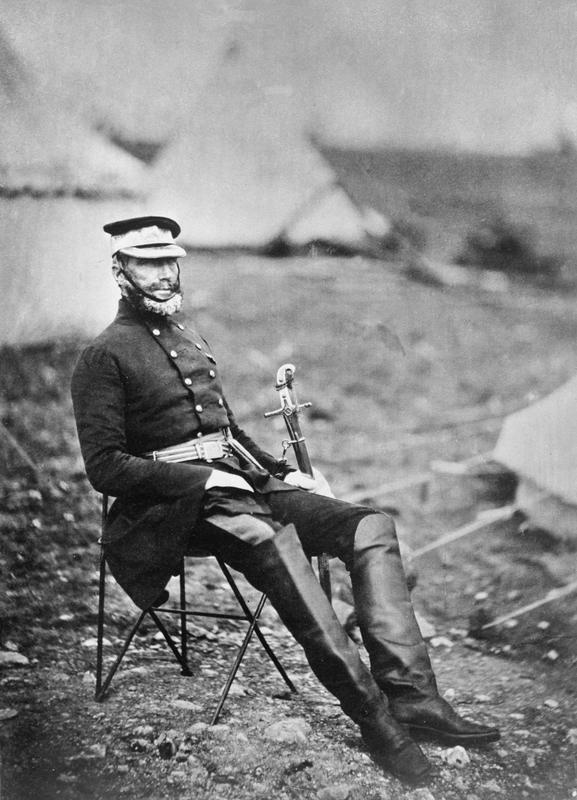
- Buller in camp during the Crimean War, 1854
- Born: 1802
- Died: 12 April 1884 (aged 81–82)
- Spouse: Henrietta Macdonald
- Military career
- Allegiance: United Kingdom
- Branch: British Army
- Rank: General

General Sir George Buller, GCB (1802 – 12 April 1884) was an English general officer of the British Army who served in the Rifle Brigade and as a commander of a brigade in the Crimean War.

== Life ==
He was the third son of General Frederick William Buller of Pelynt and Lanreath in Cornwall, who had himself served with distinction in the 57th Foot in the Netherlands and the West Indies. George was gazetted a second lieutenant in the Rifle Brigade on 2 March 1820. The first twenty-five years of his career in the army were spent in a time of peace, and his marriage with Henrietta, daughter of General Sir John Macdonald, Adjutant-General to the Forces, helped his rapid promotion. He became lieutenant in March 1825; captain, in August 1828; major, in December 1830; lieutenant-colonel in August 1835; and colonel in November 1841.

In February 1847, he joined his battalion at the Cape. The first Kaffir War had just broken out, and Buller was at once appointed to the command of a brigade, and eventually of the 2nd Division. In September 1847 he was appointed second in command to Sir George Berkeley in the campaign in the Amatola mountains, in which his battalion chased Sandilli so hotly that the chief surrendered to Buller on 19 October. He was gazetted Companion of the Order of the Bath in December 1847. In 1848 he served under Sir Harry Smith in the War against Pretorius, and on 29 August led the attack on the Boomplaats, where he was severely wounded, and had his horse killed under him. His battalion now came home, but in 1852 he was again ordered to go with his regiment to the Cape. At the head of a brigade in General Somerset's division he burnt the kraals in the Waterkloof in the Second Kaffir War, and was present at the Battle of Berea, where he was publicly thanked by Sir George Cathcart, and eventually succeeded Somerset in the command of his division in August 1852.

In October 1853, Buller's battalion was again ordered home, and in spite of Sir George Cathcart's entreaties that he would remain as a brigadier at the Cape, he insisted on accompanying it. When it was decided to send an expeditionary army to the East in 1854, Buller was appointed brigadier-general, and took the command of the 2nd Brigade of the Light Division, consisting of the 19th, 88th, and 77th Regiments. His conduct at the Battle of the Alma was severely criticised at the time, but was approved by military writers looking back at the war.

At the Battle of Inkerman he was severely wounded in the left arm. He was promoted to major-general in December 1854, and made Knight Commander of the Bath on 6 July 1855. He had to return home, owing to his wound, in March 1855.

He married Henrietta MacDonald 22 October 1855 at St John's Church, St John Lee, near Hexham in Northumberland.

He commanded the division in the Ionian Isles from 1856 to 1862, and was made colonel-commandant of the Rifle Brigade in 1860, and promoted lieutenant-general in 1862. He commanded the troops of the Southern District at Portsmouth from 1865 to 1870, was made Knight Grand Cross of the Bath in 1869, and promoted full general in 1871. He was a commander of the Legion of Honour, and knight of the second class of the Order of the Medjidie. He died at his house in Bruton Street on 12 April 1884, at the age of eighty-two.

== Notes ==
Military offices
Preceded by Horatio George Broke	Colonel of the 88th Regiment of Foot (Connaught Rangers); 1860	Succeeded by John Cox
Preceded by Sir Harry Smith	Colonel-Commandant of the 1st Battalion, The Prince Consort's Own (Rifle Brigade); 1860–1884	Succeeded by Sir Arthur Johnstone Lawrence
Preceded by Lord William Paulet (As GOC South-West District)	GOC Southern District; 1865–1870	Succeeded by The Viscount Templetown
