= Battle of Sidon (1840) =

- Part of the Egyptian–Ottoman War (1839–1841)
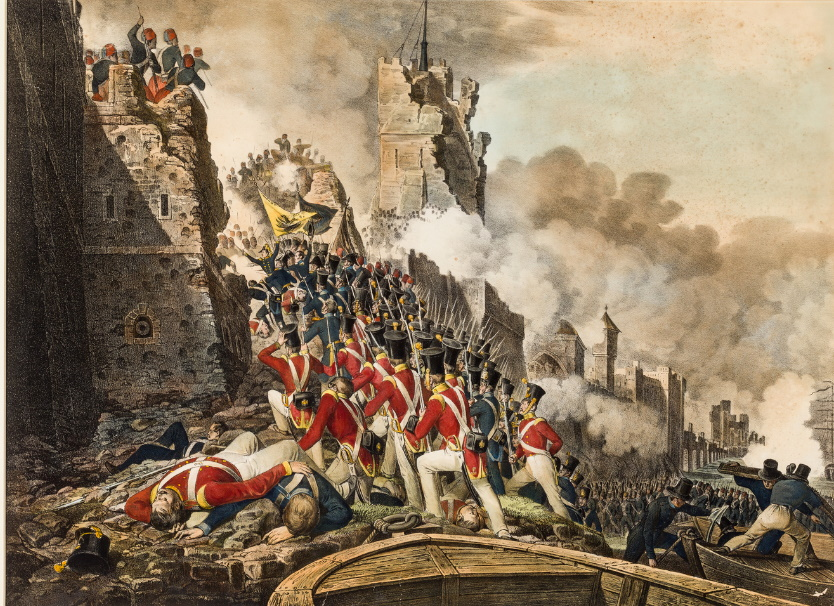
- Archduke Friedrich capturing Sidon
Date	26 September 1840
Location	Sidon, modern day Lebanon
Result	Anglo-Austrian-Ottoman victory

Belligerents
Egypt	(United Kingdom of Great Britain and Ireland) United Kingdom; Ottoman Empire; Austrian Empire

Commanders and leaders
Muhammad Ali Pasha	(United Kingdom of Great Britain and Ireland) Robert Stopford (United Kingdom of Great Britain and Ireland) Charles Napier (Austrian Empire) Archduke Friedrich

Strength
2,700	700 British; 500 Ottomans; 100 Austrians; 8 ships

Casualties and losses
1,500 prisoners	Light

The Battle of Sidon was an engagement between the Anglo-Austro-Ottoman and the Egyptian forces. It ended with the capture of Sidon by the Allies.

== Battle ==
Admiral Stopford wanted to seize Sidon and entrusted Admiral Napier with this task. Sidon was protected by a citadel and line of wall. With eight ships Napier began shelling the square for 30 minutes. The Anglo-Ottoman forces tried to land twice, but were repelled. Tasked with directing the attack on the southern castle while the ships were still firing, Archduke Friedrich first landed a detachment, which quickly climbed the heights of the banks, and soon afterwards a second, which landed despite the enemy gunfire coming from some houses. After this detachment, combined with a detachment of Englishmen, had positioned itself as a reserve at the entrance to the town, Archduke Friedrich himself, at the head of the first detachment and a few Englishmen, advanced towards the mountain castle, which he climbed first of all. Soon afterwards a detachment of Englishmen, who had entered the city from the north, arrived there, while the Turkish troops were entering from the side of the water castle. By 6 o'clock in the afternoon Sidon was captured. 1,500 Egyptians were taken prisoner.
