= List of commanders of the British 4th Division =

4th Division 4th Infantry Division 4th Armoured Division
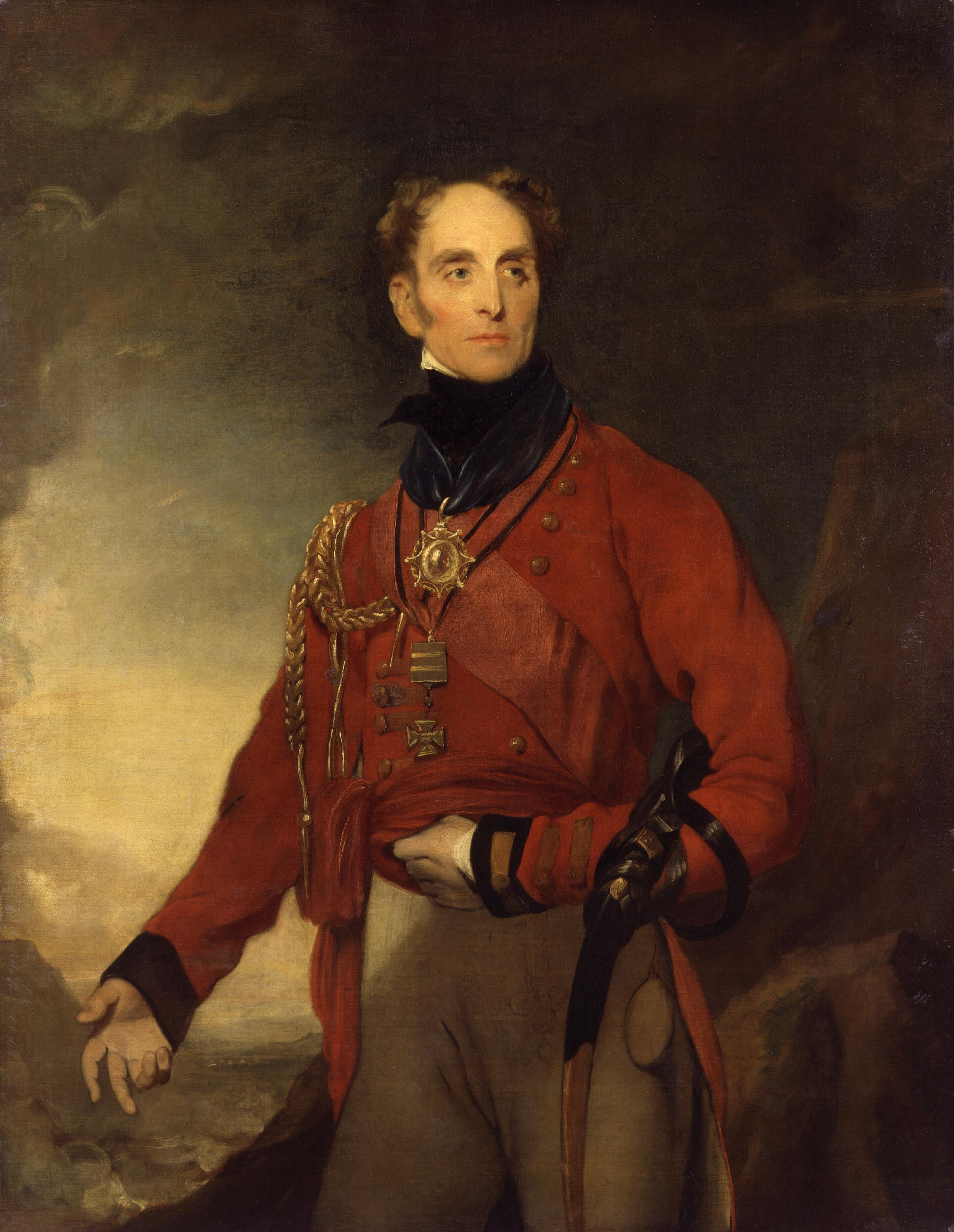
- Galbraith Lowry Cole, the commanding officer of the 4th Division, for the majority of the Peninsular War
- Active: Raised and disbanded numerous times between 1809 and 2012
- Country: United Kingdom
- Branch: British Army
- Engagements: Napoleonic Wars; Crimean War; Second Boer War; First World War; Second World War

The 4th Division was an infantry division of the British Army, which was first formed in 1809 and disbanded for the final time in 2012. The division was commanded by a general officer commanding (GOC). In this role, the GOC received orders from a level above him in the chain of command, and then used the forces within the division to undertake the mission assigned. In addition to directing the tactical battle in which the division was involved, the GOC oversaw a staff and the administrative, logistical, medical, training, and discipline of the division. The division had 63 different permanent GOCs over its history that spanned 203 years

Prior to 1809, the British Army did not use divisional formations. As the British military grew in size during the Napoleonic Wars, the need arose for such an implementation in order to better organise forces for administrative, logistical, and tactical reasons. The 4th Division was formed on 18 June 1809 by Lieutenant-General Arthur Wellesley, and served in the Peninsular War (part of the Napoleonic Wars). During this period, three of the division's commanding officers were wounded. Major-General Galbraith Lowry Cole was wounded on two separate occasions, while leading the division. After the Peninsular War ended in 1814, the division was disbanded only to be re-raised the following year when the War of the Seventh Coalition broke out. It then fought at the Battle of Waterloo, and was disbanded the same year when the Napoleonic Wars concluded.

It was next raised for service in the Crimean War (1853–1856). During the Battle of Inkerman (5 November 1854), the division had four different commanding officers, with two killed in action. Following the end of the war, in 1856, the division was disbanded. Forty-three years later, in 1899, the division was reformed to take part in the Second Boer War. Lieutenant-General William Penn Symons, who initially led the division, was wounded in action and subsequently taken prisoner. When the need for divisions subsided, the following year, the division was broken-up to provide garrisons for various static locations.

In 1902, a new 4th Division was formed as a permanent standing formation and not for a particular crisis. During the 20th century, the division fought in the First and Second World Wars. Major-General Louis Lipsett, the division's penultimate commander during the First World War, was killed in action shortly before the war ended in November 1918. In the post-Second World War years, it formed part of the British Army of the Rhine in Germany. During the 1960s, Major-General Jean Allard became the first Canadian to command a British Army division when he was appointed to lead the 4th. In 1978, the infantry division was transformed into an armoured formation. It maintained this role until the division was disbanded in 1993, when the British Army was downsized following the end of the Cold War. It was re-raised in 1995 as an administrative formation and maintained this role until 2012, when it was disbanded for the final time.

== General officer commanding ==
General officer commanding
No.	General officer commanding	Rank	Appointment date	Notes	Source(s)
1	Alexander Campbell	Major-General	18 June 1809	The division was formed for the first time, during the Peninsular War, from troops based in Portugal. Campbell was wounded in action at the Battle of Talavera, on 28 July 1809.	
Temporary	James Kemmis	Colonel	28 July 1809		
2	Galbraith Lowry Cole	Major-General	October 1809	Cole was wounded during the Battle of Albuera on 16 May 1811.	
Temporary	James Kemmis	Colonel	16 May 1811	Promoted to Major-General during temporary tenure	
2	Galbraith Lowry Cole	Major-General	July 1811	Cole returned to the UK on sick leave in December 1811.	
3	Sir Charles Colville	Major-General	22 December 1811	Colville was wounded in action during the siege of Badajoz in April 1812. His position was kept vacant following Colville's injury until June 1812.	
2	Galbraith Lowry Cole	Major-General	June 1812	Cole was assigned as commander following his return from injury. He was again wounded, this time at the Battle of Salamanca on 22 July.	
Acting	William Anson	Major-General	22 July 1812		
2	Galbraith Lowry Cole	Major-General	15 October 1812	Cole maintained this role until the conclusion of the Peninsular War, in 1814, when the division was disbanded in France.	
4	Henry de Hinuber	Major-General	11 April 1815	On 11 April 1815, the division was reformed in the Southern Netherlands.	
3	Sir Charles Colville	Lieutenant-General	28 April 1815	Following the conclusion of the Napoleonic Wars, the British military in France was reorganised into three divisions. The remaining forces, including the 4th Division, were stood down.	
5	Sir George Cathcart	Lieutenant-General	18 August 1854	The division was formed in Varna, Ottoman Bulgaria, from British troops who had been assembled, and had prepared to move to the Crimean peninsular during the Crimean War. Cathcart was killed in action at the Battle of Inkerman on 5 November 1854.	
Acting	Thomas Leigh-Goldie	Brigadier-General	5 November 1854	Leigh-Goldie commanded the division's first brigade, and took over command during the Battle of Inkerman after Cathcart was killed. Leigh-Goldie was killed soon after, during the same battle.	
Acting	Charles Windham	Brevet Colonel	5 November 1854	Windham was the assistant adjutant general of the division, and temporarily took command during the Battle of Inkerman.	
Acting	Frederick Horn	Brevet Colonel	5 November 1854	Horn commanded an infantry battalion within the division's first brigade. By the end of the Battle of Inkerman, command had fallen to him.	
Temporary	Sir John Campbell	Major-General	6 November 1854	Campbell took command of the division once the Inkerman fighting ended. He held this position until Bentinck took command the following year.	
6	Henry Bentinck	Lieutenant-General	1 June 1855	Bentinck was assigned to take command of the division following Cathcart's death. However, he was also wounded during the Battle of Inkerman and this delayed his ability to take command until June 1855.	
7	Robert Garrett	Major-General	5 October 1855	Garrett retained command of the division until 1856 and the conclusion of the war. With the end of hostilities, the division was disbanded in Crimea.	
8	Sir William Penn Symons	Lieutenant-General	9 October 1899	A new 4th Division was formed in southern Africa, from troops based there, for service in the Second Boer War. Symons was wounded during the Battle of Glencoe on 20 October. His force soon retreated following the battle and the wounded, including Symons, were captured. Symons died from his wounds on 23 October.	
Acting	James Herbert Yule	Brigadier-General	20 October 1899	Under Yule, the division retired to Ladysmith and became part of the besieged garrison on 26 October.	
9	Neville Lyttelton	Lieutenant-General	22 March 1900	Following the lifting of the siege of Ladysmith, the garrison was reorganised into a new 4th Division. At the end of 1900, while still in southern Africa, the division was broken-up.	
10	Sir Charles Knox	Major-General	30 October 1902	This marked the first time the 4th Division was formed as a permanent formation, and not raised on an ad hoc basis for a particular war.	
11	William Franklyn	Major-General	1 June 1906	Around May 1907, Franklyn's command was reorganised as the 3rd Division.	
12	Theodore Stephenson	Major-General	May 1907	Around May 1907, the 6th Division was reorganised as the 4th Division	
13	Herbert Belfield	Major-General	12 May 1907		
14	Thomas Snow	Major-General	12 May 1911	Under Snow, the division was mobilised for the First World War and departed for France. Snow was incapacitated on 9 September 1914, during the First Battle of the Marne.	
Acting	Henry Wilson	Brigadier-General	9 September 1914		
15	Sir Henry Rawlinson	Major-General	23 September 1914		
16	Henry Wilson	Major-General	4 October 1914		
17	William Lambton	Major-General	4 October 1914	Lambton was incapacitated on 12 September 1917.	
Acting	Ralph Berners	Brigadier-General	12 September 1917		
18	Torquhil Matheson	Major-General	21 September 1917		
19	Louis Lipsett	Major-General	14 September 1918	Lipsett was killed in action on 14 October 1918.	
20	Cuthbert Lucas	Major-General	15 October 1918	On 6 January 1919, the division was demobilised in Belgium.	
21	Sir Cameron Shute	Major-General	1 November 1919	The division was reformed in England	
22	Sir Reginald Stephens	Major-General	1 November 1923		
23	Sir Percy Radcliffe	Major-General	1 April 1926		
24	Archibald Cameron	Major-General	1 October 1927		
25	Charles Bonham-Carter	Major-General	1 June 1931		
26	John Brind	Major-General	21 July 1933	On 13 December 1934, Brind was temporarily assigned as the commander of the peacekeeping International Force in the Saar, and held this position until 16 March 1935.	
27	James Dick-Cunyngham	Major-General	1 June 1935	Died in office	
28	Clive Liddell	Major-General	27 November 1935		
Acting	Unknown	Unknown	13 December 1937	On this date, Liddell relinquished command of the division. A new commanding officer was not appointed until the new year.	
29	Dudley Johnson	Major-General	7 January 1938	During Johnson's tenure, the division was mobilised for service in the Second World War. The division was deployed to France in 1939 and was evacuated back to the UK in 1940.	
30	Ralph Eastwood	Major-General	25 June 1940		
31	John Swayne	Major-General	4 October 1940		
32	John Hawkesworth	Major-General	9 March 1942	During Hawkesworth's tenure, the division was deployed to Tunisia and fought in the Tunisian campaign.	
Acting	John Hogshaw	Brigadier	22 August 1943		
33	Hayman Hayman-Joyce	Major-General	5 September 1943	During Hayman-Joyce's tenure, the division was deployed to fight in the Italian campaign.	
34	Dudley Ward	Major-General	20 April 1944	In December 1944, the division was deployed to Greece and would remain there until the end of the war.	
Acting	Rudolph. Kirwan	Brigadier	9 March 1945		
34	Dudley Ward	Major-General	2 April 1945		
Acting	Rudolph Kirwan	Brigadier	20 April 1945		
35	Colin Callander	Major-General	25 April 1945		
36	Ernest Down	Major-General	26 September 1946	The division was disbanded, in Greece, in March 1947.	
37	Reginald Hewetson	Major-General	April 1956	In April 1956, the 11th Armoured Division, based in Germany, was reorganised as the 4th Infantry Division.	
38	Gerald Hopkinson	Major-General	2 March 1958	During Hopkinson's tenure, the word 'infantry' was dropped from the division's title.	
39	Desmond Gordon	Major-General	12 October 1959		
40	Jean Allard	Major-General	10 November 1961	Allard was a Canadian Army officer, and the first Canadian to command a British Army division.	
41	Basil Eugster	Major-General	15 October 1963		
42	Michael Forrester	Major-General	14 October 1965		
43	Vernon Erskine-Crum	Major-General	16 October 1967		
44	David Fraser	Major-General	10 October 1969		
45	Anthony Farrar-Hockley	Major-General	10 October 1971		
46	Michael Gow	Major-General	10 October 1973		
47	Nigel Bagnall	Major-General	21 September 1975		
48	Richard Vickers	Major-General	7 October 1977	On 1 January 1978, the formation was redesignated as the 4th Armoured Division.	
49	John Akehurst	Major-General	19 July 1979		
50	Jeremy Reilly	Major-General	20 November 1981		
51	John Waters	Major-General	21 November 1983		
52	Michael Hobbs	Major-General	December 1985		
53	William Rous	Major-General	30 November 1987		
54	Jeremy Mackenzie	Major-General	15 December 1989		
55	Anthony Denison-Smith	Major-General	15 December 1989	As part of Options for Change, the division was disbanded in Germany in 1993.	
55	Anthony Denison-Smith	Lieutenant-General	1 April 1995	The division was reformed in England	
56	Nigel Richards	Major-General	31 March 1996		
57	Timothy Sulivan	Major-General	1998		
58	John Holmes	Major General	29 January 2001		
59	Andrew Ritchie	Major General	1 April 2002		
60	David Judd	Major General	6 January 2003		
61	Seumas Kerr	Major General	1 May 2004		
62	Peter Everson	Major General	16 October 2006		
63	Lamont Kirkland	Major General	12 November 2008	During January 2012, the division was disbanded.	
