= General Kirkland =

General Kirkland may refer to:

- Donald Kirkland (fl. 1980s–2020s), U.S. Air Force lieutenant general
- Lamont Kirkland (fl. 1970s–2010s), British Army major general
- William Whedbee Kirkland (1833–1915), Confederate States Army brigadier general
