= Allan Adair =

British Army general

Major-General Sir Allan Adair Bt GCVO CB DSO MC & Bar JP DL
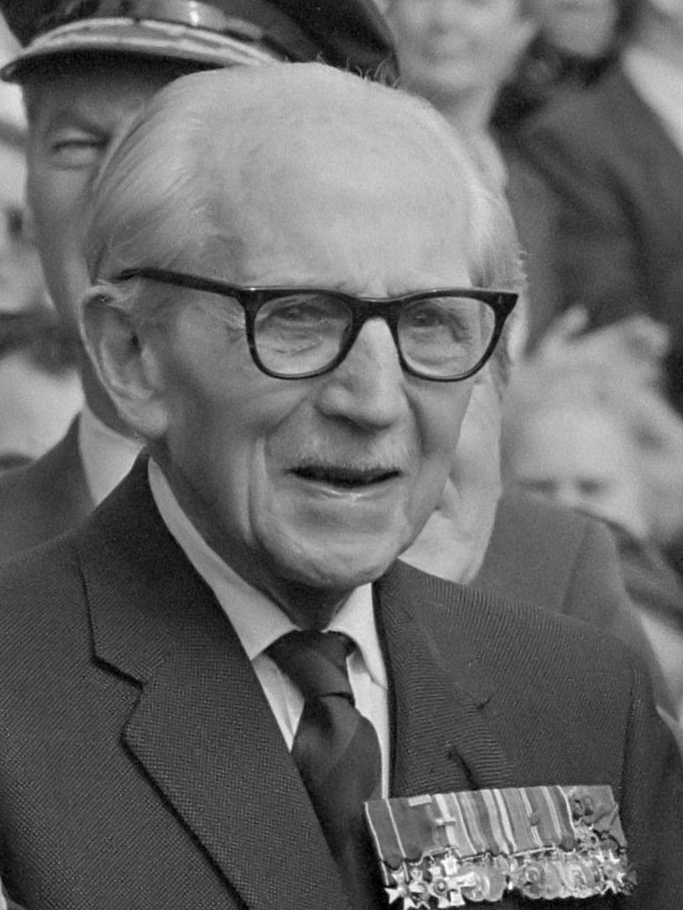
- Adair in 1984
- Born: 3 November 1897; London, England
- Died: 4 August 1988 (aged 90); Norfolk, England
- Military career
- Allegiance: United Kingdom
- Branch: British Army
- Service years: 1916–1947
- Rank: Major-General
- Nickname: "Baronet Adair"
- Service number: 15446
- Unit: Grenadier Guards
- Commands: 13th Infantry Division (1945–1946); Guards Division (1945); Guards Armoured Division (1942–1945); 6th Guards Armoured Brigade (1941–1942); 30th Independent Infantry Brigade (1940–1941); 3rd Battalion, Grenadier Guards (1940)
- Conflicts: First World War; Second World War
- Awards: Knight Grand Cross of the Royal Victorian Order; Companion of the Order of the Bath; Companion of the Distinguished Service Order; Military Cross & Bar; Mentioned in Despatches (4); Commander of the Order of Leopold with Palm (Belgium); Croix de guerre (Belgium) with Palm; Croix de guerre (France)

Major-General Sir Allan Henry Shafto Adair, 6th Baronet, GCVO, CB, DSO, MC & Bar, JP, DL (3 November 1897 – 4 August 1988) was a senior officer of the British Army who served in both World wars; as a company commander in the Grenadier Guards in the First World War, and as general officer commanding of the Guards Armoured Division in the Second World War.

== Early life ==
Adair was born in London, the only son of Sir Robert Shafto Adair, 5th Baronet, and Mary Bosanquet. He attended Harrow School between 1912 and 1916.

== First World War ==
Adair fought in the First World War. He joined the British Army, receiving his commission as a probationary second lieutenant on 2 May 1916 in the 5th (Reserve) Battalion of the Grenadier Guards, the same regiment with which an ancestor of Adair's had been serving when he was killed at the battle of Waterloo.

From January 1917 onwards he served in the trenches of the Western Front in France and Belgium as part of the 2nd Company, 3rd Battalion, Grenadier Guards, with the rank of lieutenant. The battalion was part of the 2nd Guards Brigade of the Guards Division. Adair's first major battle was in the pursuit of the retreating German Army to the Hindenburg Line. The division then took part in the battle of Passchendaele. Adair, however, took no part in the battle, due to an injury sustained in a bicycle accident in early July 1917. He returned to the battalion in January 1918, by which time he discovered that there were only four of his fellow officers still with the battalion.

Adair was awarded his first Military Cross (MC) on 2 December 1918. The citation reads:

For conspicuous gallantry and resource while in command of the support company. Owing to thick fog the leading company lost direction and failed to turn up. He led his company correctly into position and then made several personal reconnaissances under heavy machine-gun and rifle fire, and cleared up the situation. He captured the objectives without the assistance of tanks or artillery, and broke up a hostile counter-attack the following morning.

With the acting rank of captain, Adair was officer commanding 2 Company from 22 September to 11 November 1918, receiving his second MC after the war on 2 April 1919 "for conspicuous gallantry and skill at Preux-au-Sart, on 4 November 1918. In command of the left front company, which was held up by an organised line of machine guns, he so manoeuvred his platoons as to capture the line with a minimum of casualties. Although wounded in the leg, he continued in command until relieved the following day".

== Between the wars ==
After the armistice of 11 November 1918 Adair's battalion returned to London, where on 29 June 1920 he received his permanent lieutenant's commission, with seniority backdated to 2 August 1918. On 29 September 1923 he was promoted to captain in the 2nd Battalion and in February 1926 was appointed as a staff captain.

He was promoted to major on 22 May 1932, and returned to the 3rd Battalion to serve as second-in-command until April 1940, seven months after the Second World War broke out.

== Second World War ==
After a short time as chief instructor at 161 Infantry Officer Cadet Training Unit at Sandhurst, he returned to his regiment on 8 May 1940, where he was appointed commanding officer of the 3rd Battalion with the rank of acting lieutenant colonel. The battalion, forming part of the 1st Guards Brigade of the 1st Infantry Division (the former commanded by Brigadier Merton Beckwith-Smith and the latter by Major-General Harold Alexander, both, like Adair, Guardsmen), soon found themselves in the thick of the fighting during the battles of Belgium and France, and held the perimeter against German attacks during the Dunkirk evacuation. Lance Corporal Harry Nicholls from Adair's battalion was awarded one of the first Victoria Crosses of the war. The 1st Guards Brigade briefly served under the control of the 5th Infantry Division, commanded by Major-General Harold Franklyn. It was when Adair's battalion launched a counterattack which helped restore the British line, which impressed Franklyn, who later wrote:

I give this example of the highest form of discipline. Last May, when my Division was being hard pressed on the Ypres-Comines Canal I was given a Battalion of the Grenadier Guards as a reserve. After marching well over twenty miles on a very hot day they arrived at my Headquarters at 7.30 p.m. An hour later they were put into a vital counter-attack in the half light, over unknown ground. They advanced as efficiently as if on a field day at Pirbright – and their efforts were completely successful.

Adair, appointed a Companion of the Distinguished Service Order for his services in Belgium and France, was promoted to lieutenant colonel on 19 September 1940. On 17 October he was appointed Commander of the 30th Independent Infantry Brigade (Guards), re-designated the 6th Guards Armoured Brigade on 15 September 1941, with the rank of temporary brigadier.

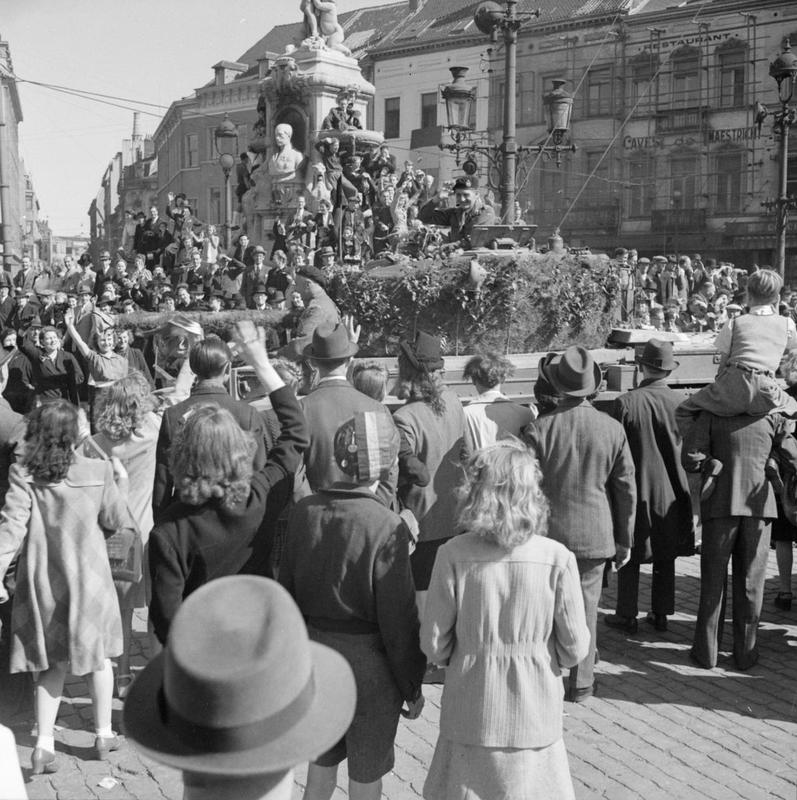
Scenes of jubilation as British troops liberate Brussels, 4 September 1944. Major-General Adair, GOC Guards Armoured Division, acknowledges the crowd from his Cromwell command tank.

From 12 September 1942 until December 1945 Adair was general officer commanding (GOC) of the Guards Armoured Division, taking over from Major-General Oliver Leese, receiving promotion to colonel on 30 June 1943, while serving as an acting and then temporary major-general from 21 September 1942.

After training the division throughout the United Kingdom for the next 21 months, the Guards Armoured Division arrived in Normandy as part of Operation Overlord on 28 June 1944 as part of Lieutenant General Sir Richard O'Connor's VIII Corps, first seeing action during Operation Goodwood in July, and then in Operation Bluecoat in July/August.

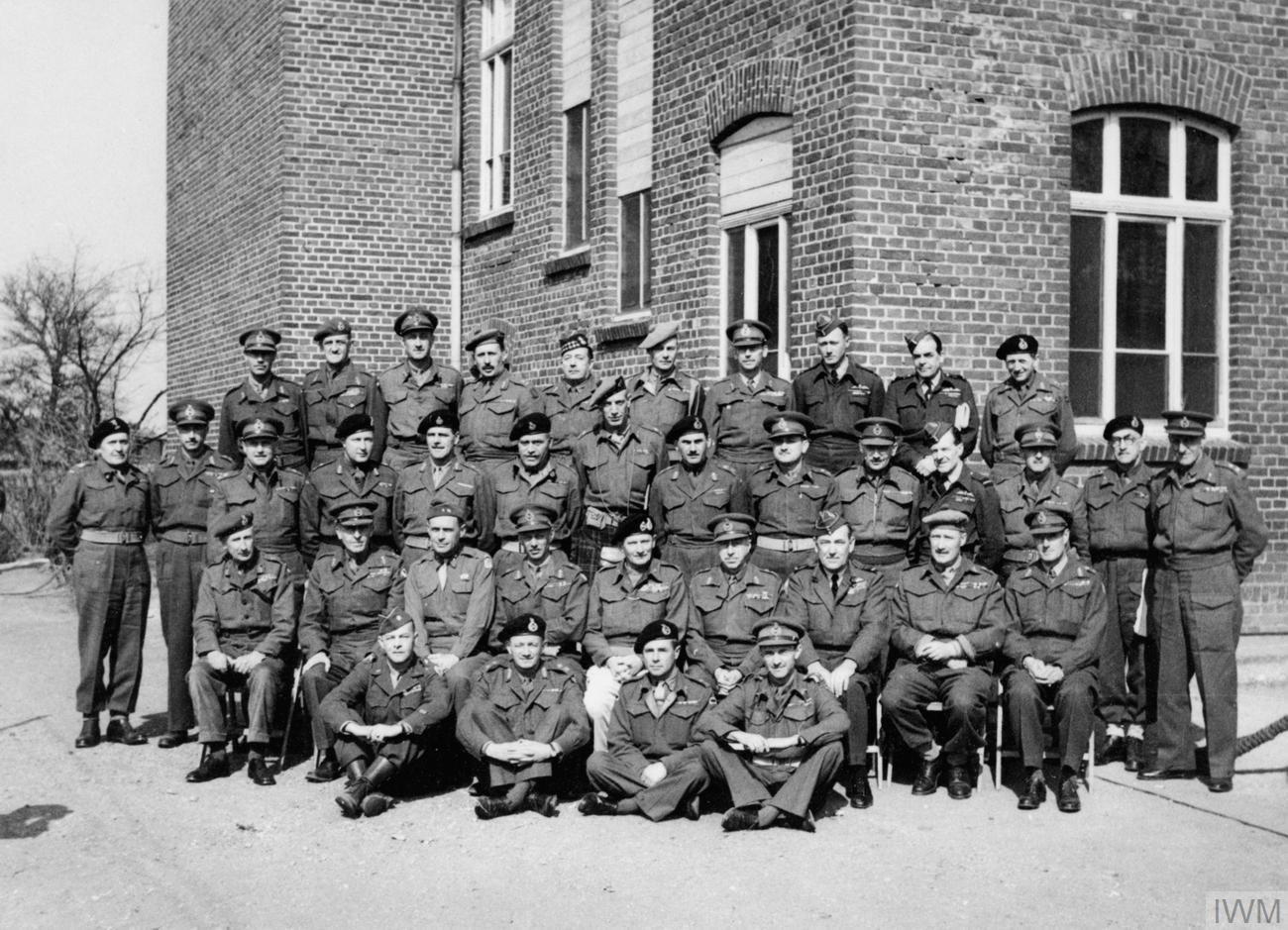
Field Marshal Montgomery (second row, fifth from the left) with his staff and senior commanders at Walbeck, Germany, 22 March 1945. Major-General Adair is stood in the back row, farthest on the right.

Following the Allied break-out from Normandy they advanced across Northern France and into Belgium as part of Lieutenant General Brian Horrocks' XXX Corps. The division liberated Brussels, after making an unprecedented advance from Douai, 97 miles (156 km) away, in only 14 hours. The division then took a leading role in the ground advance in Operation Market Garden in September.

Held in reserve during the Battle of the Bulge in December, it was committed to the Battle of the Reichswald (Operation Veritable) in February and March 1945. After advancing through Germany and the German surrender in May 1945 the Guards Armoured Division remained as part of the occupying forces, but on 12 June 1945 was converted into an infantry formation, the Guards Division.

== Post-war ==
From December 1945, three months after the surrender of Japan, until November 1946 Adair served as GOC of the 13th Infantry Division, during the Greek Civil War and receiving promotion to major-general on 25 July 1946, with seniority from 12 November 1944. He finally retired from active service on 11 March 1947, but remained in the Regular Army Reserve of Officers until reaching the mandatory retirement age on 3 November 1957, his 60th birthday.

== Later life ==
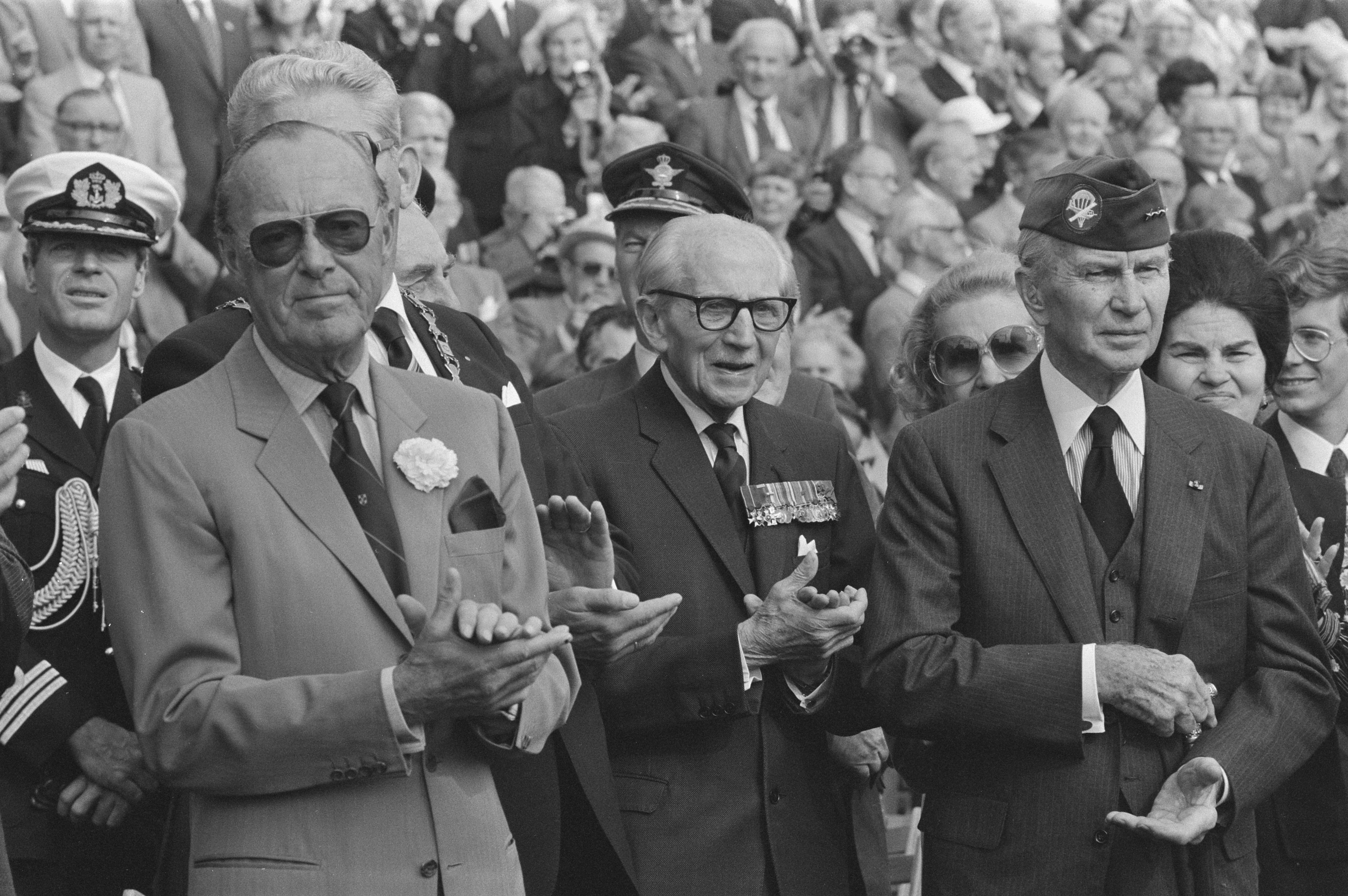
Opening of the National Liberation Museum in Nijmegen and commemoration of Operation Market Garden, 17 September 1984; from left to right: Prince Bernhard; British former Major-General Sir Allan HS Adair (former commander of the Guards Armoured Division); former US Lieutenant General James M. Gavin (former commander of the 82nd Airborne Division).

Adair was appointed Exon in the Yeomen of the Guard, the ceremonial bodyguards to the monarch, on 21 November 1947, receiving promotion to Ensign on 30 June 1950 and then to Lieutenant on 31 August 1951, before finally retiring on 14 November 1967.

He served as a governor of Harrow School from 1947 until 1952, was colonel of the Grenadier Guards from 1961 to 1974, and a Deputy Grand Master of the United Grand Lodge of Freemasons from 1969 to 1976.

He also served as deputy lieutenant for County Antrim, and as a justice of the peace for the county of Suffolk.

== Personal life ==
On 28 April 1919 Adair married Enid Violet Ida Ward (1897–1984). They had two sons; Lieutenant Desmond Allan Shafto Adair (1920–1943), killed in action in Italy, and Robert Dudley Shafto Adair (1923–1925), and three daughters; Bridget Mary Adair (b. 1928), Juliet Enid Adair (b. 1930) and Annabel Violet Adair (b. 1937).

Adair succeeded his father as 6th baronet on 9 October 1949 inheriting the family home of Flixton Hall in Suffolk. However the burden of its upkeep and maintenance, combined with heavy death duties meant that he was obliged to sell the property in 1950. In his 1986 memoir, Adair described Flixton Hall as "a vast, uncomfortable mausoleum, with no proper central heating. In winter the children had to wear their overcoats when moving from room to room". It was demolished within two years. Adair then settled in the village of Raveningham, Norfolk.

Adair died on 4 August 1988 at the age of 90. With no surviving sons, the title became extinct.

== Publications ==
- Adair, Allan (1986). Oliver Lindsey (ed.). A Guards' General: the memoirs of Major-General Sir Allan Adair, Bt, GCVO, CB, DSO, MC, JP, DL. London: Hamish Hamilton.

== Bibliography ==
- Doherty, Richard (2004). Ireland's Generals in the Second World War. Four Courts Press. ISBN 978-1-85182-865-4.
- Mead, Richard (2007). Churchill's Lions: a biographical guide to the key British generals of World War II. Stroud (UK): Spellmount. ISBN 978-1-86227-431-0.
- Smart, Nick (2005). Biographical Dictionary of British Generals of the Second World War. Barnsley, South Yorkshire: Pen and Sword Books. ISBN 1844150496.

Military offices
Preceded by Sir Oliver Leese	GOC Guards Armoured Division; 1942–1945	Post redesignated Guards Division
New command	GOC Guards Division; June–December 1945	Succeeded by John Marriott
New command	GOC 13th Infantry Division; 1945–1946	Post disbanded
Honorary titles
Preceded by The Lord Jeffreys	Colonel of the Grenadier Guards; 1961–1974	Succeeded by Prince Philip, Duke of Edinburgh
Baronetage of the United Kingdom
Preceded by Robert Adair	Baronet (of Flixton Hall); 1949–1988]	Extinct
