= Rudolph Kirwan =

British brigadier-general

Brigadier Rudolph Kirwan DSO OBE
- Born: 1903
- Died: 1990 (aged 86−87)
- Military career
- Allegiance: United Kingdom
- Branch: British Army
- Service years: 1923–1945
- Rank: Brigadier
- Service number: 23667
- Unit: Royal Artillery
- Commands: 4th Division
- Conflicts: First World War; Second World War
- Awards: Distinguished Service Order; Officer of the Order of the British Empire

Brigadier Rudolph Charles Hogg Kirwan, DSO, OBE (1903–1990) was a British Army officer who twice briefly commanded the 4th Division during the Second World War.

== Military career ==
Educated at Eagle House School and the Royal Military Academy, Woolwich, Kirwan was commissioned into the Royal Artillery on 31 January 1923.

He attended the Staff College, Camberley from 1938 to 1939.

He served in the Second World War as Directory Royal Artillery for the 4th Division, and then the division's 10th Infantry Brigade, which was serving in Greece during the early stages of the Greek Civil War. While Major-General Dudley Ward, the 4th's commander, was otherwise engaged, Kirwan served as acting General Officer Commanding 4th Division from 9 March 1945 to 2 April 1945 and then again from 20 April 1945 to 25 April 1945.

Kirwan was appointed Officer of the Order of the British Empire on 16 July 1940 and a Companion of the Distinguished Service Order on 19 April 1945.
