= Desmond Gordon =

British Army general (1911–1997)

Major-General Desmond Gordon CB CBE DSO JP DL
- Born: 25 December 1911
- Died: 4 November 1997 (aged 85)
- Military career
- Allegiance: United Kingdom
- Branch: British Army
- Service years: 1932−1966
- Rank: Major-General
- Service number: 50906
- Unit: Green Howards
- Commands: 1/7th Battalion, Queen's Royal Regiment (West Surrey); 151st Infantry Brigade; 146th Infantry Brigade; 131st Lorried Infantry Brigade; 16th Independent Parachute Brigade Group; 4th Division
- Conflicts: World War II
- Awards: Companion of the Order of the Bath; Commander of the Order of the British Empire; Distinguished Service Order

Major-General Desmond Spencer Gordon CB CBE DSO JP DL (25 December 1911 – 4 November 1997) was a British Army officer who commanded 4th Division.

== Military career ==
Educated at Haileybury and the Royal Military College, Sandhurst, Gordon was commissioned as a second lieutenant into the Green Howards on 28 January 1932.

He served in the Second World War as Commanding Officer of 1/7th Queen's Regiment from 1943 and then as Commander of the 151st (Durham) Infantry Brigade from 1944 and as Commander of 146th Infantry Brigade from later that year in North West Europe.

After the War he was made Commander of 131st Lorried Infantry Brigade. He became Deputy Director of Infantry at the War Office in 1951, Commander of 16th Independent Parachute Brigade Group in 1952 and Assistant Commandant of the Royal Military Academy Sandhurst in 1956. He went on to be Deputy Assistant Adjutant and Quartermaster General at Headquarters 1st Corps in 1959, General Officer Commanding 4th Division in 1959 and Chief Army Instructor at the Imperial Defence College in 1962. His last appointment was as Assistant Chief of Defence Staff in 1964 before retiring in 1966.

In retirement he became Commander-in-Chief of the St John's Ambulance Brigade. Carlos Luis Sancha was commissioned to paint his portrait in 1976.

Military offices
Preceded by Gerald Hopkinson	GOC 4th Division; 1959−1961	Succeeded by Jean Allard
