= Seumas Kerr =

British Army general

Major General Seumas Kerr CBE
- Born: 1953 (age 72–73)
- Relatives: Marquess of Lothian
- Military career
- Allegiance: United Kingdom
- Branch: British Army
- Service years: 1973–2006
- Rank: Major General
- Commands: 4th Division
- Conflicts: Operation Banner; Iraq War
- Awards: Commander of the Order of the British Empire

Major General John Seumas Kerr CBE (born 1953), a kinsman of the Marquesses of Lothian, is a former British Army officer who commanded 4th Division.

== Military career ==
Kerr was commissioned in to the Royal Army Ordnance Corps in 1973. As a colonel he undertook a tour in Northern Ireland in 1995 during the Troubles in recognition of which he was appointed CBE. He became Deputy Adjutant-General in December 1999, then Assistant Chief of Staff with responsibility for logistics at Permanent Joint Headquarters in Northwood in 2002 during the Iraq War and General Officer Commanding 4th Division in 2004 before he retired in 2006.

From 1 June 2006, Kerr was made Honorary Colonel of 36th (Eastern) Signal Regiment, RCS, taking over from former Deputy Lieutenant of London, Colonel Stephen P. Foakes.

In retirement Kerr joined the senior management of the support services arm of Carillion before becoming managing director of The D Group and Strategy International in 2018. In 2020 he became the chairman of the Victory Services Club.

Military offices
Preceded by David Judd	General Officer Commanding the 4th Division; 2004–2006	Succeeded by Peter Everson
