= Anthony Denison-Smith =

British Army general (born 1942)

Lieutenant General Sir Anthony Denison-Smith KBE DL
- Born: 24 January 1942 (age 84)
- Military career
- Allegiance: United Kingdom
- Branch: British Army
- Service years: 1962–1996
- Rank: Lieutenant General
- Commands: Southern District; 1st (UK) Armoured Division; 4th Armoured Division; 22nd Armoured Brigade; 2nd Battalion Grenadier Guards
- Conflicts: The Troubles; United Nations Peacekeeping Force in Cyprus
- Awards: Knight Commander of the Order of the British Empire

Lieutenant General Sir Anthony Arthur Denison-Smith, KBE, DL (born 24 January 1942) is a former British Army officer who commanded the 1st (UK) Armoured Division from 1993 to 1994.

== Military career ==
Educated at Harrow School and the Royal Military Academy Sandhurst, Denison-Smith was commissioned into the Grenadier Guards in 1962. He was given command of the 2nd Battalion Grenadier Guards in 1981, during which time he was deployed in a peace-keeping role in Cyprus. He was appointed chief of staff for the 4th Armoured Division in 1983, commander of the 22nd Armoured Brigade in 1985 and chief of staff for the 1st British Corps in 1988. He went on to be Director General Doctrine and Training at the Ministry of Defence in 1990, General Officer Commanding 4th Armoured Division in 1991 and then General Officer Commanding 1st (UK) Armoured Division in 1993 when it was reformed from 4th Armoured Division. His last appointment was as General Officer Commanding Southern District in 1994 before he retired in 1996.

In retirement Denison-Smith became Lieutenant of the Tower of London.

== Family ==
Denison-Smith is married to Julia and they have three sons.

Military offices
Preceded by Jeremy Mackenzie	General Officer Commanding 4th Armoured Division; 1991–1993	Division disbanded and reformed in 1995 (Post next held by Nigel Richards)
Preceded by Iain Mackay-Dick	General Officer Commanding 1st (UK) Armoured Division; 1993–1994	Succeeded by Roddy Cordy-Simpson
Preceded by Sir Richard Swinburn (As GOC South East District)	General Officer Commanding Southern District; 1994–1996	Post abolished
