= Timothy Sulivan =

British Army general

Major General Timothy Sulivan CB CBE DL
- Born: 1946 (age 79–80)
- Military career
- Allegiance: United Kingdom
- Branch: British Army
- Service years: 1966–2001
- Rank: Major General
- Commands: The Blues and Royals; 7th Armoured Brigade; 4th Division
- Conflicts: Operation Banner; Bosnian War; Gulf War
- Awards: Companion of the Order of the Bath; Commander of the Order of the British Empire; Bronze Star Medal (US)

Major General Timothy John Sulivan CB CBE DL (born 1946) is a former British Army officer who commanded 4th Division.

== Military career ==
Sulivan was commissioned into the Royal Artillery in 1966 and transferred into the Blues and Royals in 1980. He became commanding officer of the Blues and Royals in the late 1980s.

He served as the only non-US member of General Norman Schwarzkopf's strategic planning team during the Gulf War for which he was appointed a Commander of the Order of the British Empire and awarded the Bronze Star Medal (US) in March 1991.

He went on to become Commander of 7th Armoured Brigade in 1991, Principal Staff Officer to the Chief of the Defence Staff in 1993 and Director-General for Doctrine and Development in 1994. After that he became Chief of Staff for the Allied Rapid Reaction Corps in Bosnia in 1996 and General Officer Commanding 4th Division in 1998 before he retired in 2001.

In retirement he has become vice president for customer relations with General Dynamics (UK) Ltd.

Military offices
Preceded by Nigel Richards	General Officer Commanding the 4th Division; 1998–2001	Succeeded by John Holmes
