= Gerald Hopkinson =

British Army general

Major-General Gerald Hopkinson CB DSO OBE MC
- Born: Gerald Charles Hopkinson; 27 May 1910; Wellington, Somerset, England
- Died: 2 June 1989 (aged 79); Osborne House, Isle of Wight
- Military career
- Allegiance: United Kingdom
- Branch: British Army
- Service years: 1930–1962
- Rank: Major-General
- Service number: 47586
- Unit: Royal Tank Regiment
- Commands: 44th Royal Tank Regiment; 4th Mechanized Brigade; 1st Royal Tank Regiment; 33rd Armoured Brigade; 4th Division
- Conflicts: World War II
- Awards: Companion of the Order of the Bath; Distinguished Service Order; Officer of the Order of the British Empire; Military Cross

Major-General Gerald Charles Hopkinson CB DSO OBE MC (27 May 1910 – 2 June 1989) was a British Army officer who commanded the 4th Division after seeing service in World War II.

== Early life ==
Hopkinson was born in Wellington, Somerset to Captain Charles Reginald Thompson Hopkinson of the East Surrey Regiment, who was killed in action in September 1914, a month after the British entry into World War I, and Beryl Mary Stewart.

== Military career ==
Educated at Haileybury, Hopkinson was commissioned in to the Royal Tank Corps in 1930. He served in World War II as commanding officer of the 44th Royal Tank Regiment and then, briefly, as acting commander of 4th Armoured Brigade in early 1945. He became commanding officer of 1st Royal Tank Regiment in 1952. He was appointed commander of 33rd Armoured Brigade in 1953, general officer commanding (GOC) of the 4th Division in 1957 and director of the Royal Armoured Corps in 1959 before retiring in 1962.

Military offices
Preceded by Reginald Hewetson	GOC 4th Division; 1957−1959	Succeeded by Desmond Gordon
