= Nigel Richards (British Army officer) =

British Army officer (1945–2019)

Major-General Nigel Richards CB CBE
- Born: 15 August 1945
- Died: 21 November 2019 (aged 74)
- Military career
- Allegiance: United Kingdom
- Branch: British Army
- Service years: 1965–1998
- Rank: Major-General
- Commands: 7th Regiment Royal Horse Artillery; 5th Airborne Brigade; 4th Division
- Conflicts: Bosnian War
- Awards: Companion of the Order of the Bath; Commander of the Order of the British Empire

Major-General Nigel William Fairbairn Richards CB CBE (15 August 1945 – 21 November 2019) was a British Army officer who commanded 4th Division.

== Military career ==
Educated at Peterhouse, Cambridge, Richards was commissioned into the Royal Artillery in 1965. He was given command of 7th Regiment Royal Horse Artillery in 1983. He was appointed Commander of 5th Airborne Brigade in 1989, Director of Army Staff Duties at the Ministry of Defence in 1991 and Chief of Combat Support for the Allied Rapid Reaction Corps in 1994 during the Bosnian War. His last appointment was as General Officer Commanding 4th Division in 1996 before he retired in 1998.

He died on 21 November 2019 at the age of 74.

Military offices
Preceded by Division Reformed in 1995 (Post last held by Anthony Denison-Smith)	General Officer Commanding the 4th Division; 1996–1998	Succeeded by Timothy Sulivan
