= Peter Everson =

British Army general (born 1957)

Major General Peter Everson OBE
- Born: 1957 (age 68–69)
- Military career
- Allegiance: United Kingdom
- Branch: British Army
- Service years: 1976–2008
- Rank: Major General
- Commands: 4th Division
- Conflicts: Operation Banner; Kosovo War; Iraq War
- Awards: Officer of the Order of the British Empire

Major General Peter Frederick Everson, OBE (born 1957) is a retired British Army officer who commanded the 4th Division from 2006 to 2008.

== Military career ==
Everson was commissioned into the Intelligence Corps in 1976. As a lieutenant colonel he undertook a tour in Northern Ireland in 1997 during the Troubles, for which he was appointed an Officer of the Order of the British Empire. As a colonel he was the chief intelligence officer for the Allied Rapid Reaction Corps in the Kosovo War. Promoted to brigadier, he was made Director of the Intelligence Corps and head of the Defence Intelligence and Security Centre in 2002. He was appointed the Deputy Commanding General of the Multi-National Corps – Iraq from February to September 2006 and then became General Officer Commanding 4th Division. He retired in 2008.

In retirement Everson became Head of Group Security at British American Tobacco.

Military offices
Preceded by Nick Parker	Deputy Commanding General Multi-National Corps – Iraq; February–September 2006	Succeeded by Simon Mayall
Preceded by Seumas Kerr	General Officer Commanding 4th Division; 2006–2008	Succeeded by Lamont Kirkland
