= Lamont Kirkland =

British Army general

Major General Lamont Kirkland CBE
- Born: Ayr, Scotland
- Military career
- Allegiance: United Kingdom
- Branch: British Army
- Service years: 1976–2012
- Rank: Major General
- Units: Royal Engineers; Green Howards
- Commands: Green Howards; 4th Division
- Conflicts: Former Yugoslavia
- Awards: Commander of the Order of the British Empire; Officer of the Order of the British Empire

Major General Robert Lamont Kirkland, CBE is a former senior British Army officer. He commanded 4th Division from November 2008 to January 2012 and is now full-time CEO of Team Forces.

== Career ==
Following education at Strathallan School and training at Royal Military Academy Sandhurst, Kirkland's permanent commission in the Royal Engineers as a second lieutenant was confirmed on 9 October 1976 (dated 6 March 1976). He was promoted lieutenant on 6 March 1978, captain on 6 September 1982, and major on 30 September 1989.

He transferred to the Green Howards on 17 December 1991, and was promoted lieutenant colonel on appointment as Commanding Officer of the Green Howards on 30 June 1994. On 5 December 1997 he was appointed an Officer of the Order of the British Empire (OBE) for his service in the former Yugoslavia between December 1996 and June 1997. He was promoted colonel on 30 June 2000, and brigadier on 30 June 2003. In the 2005 New Year Honours he was promoted to Commander of the Order of the British Empire (CBE). In August 2008 he was serving as Director Army Personnel Strategy when he was nominated as the next General Officer Commanding of 4th Division. This appointment took effect on 12 November 2008 when he was also promoted major general. On 6 November 2008 he also became chairman of the Army Winter Sports Association (AWSA).

He left his military posts in January 2012 on his retirement from the Army and became full-time CEO of Team Forces.

Military offices
Preceded by Peter Everson	General Officer Commanding the 4th Division; 2008–2012	Succeeded by Division disbanded
