= 13th Infantry Division (United Kingdom) =

Infantry division of the British Army

- Divisional insignia
- Active: 1945–~1946
- Country: United Kingdom
- Branch: British Army
- Type: Infantry

The 13th Infantry Division was formed in late 1945 in Greece, from the British elements of the 4th Indian Division that was based there. The insignia chosen was near-identical to that of the First World War-era 13th (Western) Division; a symbol of good luck to offset triskaidekaphobia. The Imperial War Museum stated that it is believed the division was intended to be a holding formation, one that would assist with the demobilisation of the British Armed Forces after the Second World War. In February 1946, the division relieved the 4th Infantry Division in Attica (the 4th Infantry Division moved to the northern part of Greece to relieve the 4th Indian Division that returned to India). It is not known how long into 1946 or beyond that the division existed or remained in Greece, but it is believed to have been disbanded by 1948.
