= James Kemmis =

British Army officer

Major-General James Kemmis (1 January 1751 – 2 April 1820) was a British Army officer at the time of the Napoleonic Wars.

== Career ==
He was born the son of Thomas Kemmis of Shaen and Susannah Kemmis of Shaen Castle, now in County Laois, Ireland, formerly known as Queen's County. He sold his interest in the family property to his brother and used the money to purchase an ensigncy in the British Army's 9th (East Norfolk) Regiment of Foot. Promoted to lieutenant in June 1777, after sailing to America, he fought in the Saratoga campaign as part of General Henry Powell's brigade of General John Burgoyne's army. Kemmis was captured by American rebel forces and remained a prisoner of war until 1781 when he was exchanged and returned to England.

After purchasing a captaincy in 1784 he remained on half-pay until 1790 when he exchanged into the 40th Regiment of Foot and was promoted to brevet major in 1794. Kemmis took part in the Flanders Campaign until the army was evacuated from Bremen in April 1795. He sailed with his regiment to the West Indies where he was promoted to brevet lieutenant-colonel. After service on the Helder Expedition and the 1801 Egyptian Campaign he did not accompany the 40th to South America but remained in Ireland.

Promoted to colonel, Kemmis took command of the 1st Battalion of the 40th, which arrived in Portugal on 1 August 1808 as part of Wellington's corps for service in the Peninsular War. He was mentioned in dispatches following the 1808 Battle of Vimeiro, and also fought at the battles of Roliça and Talavera for which he received the Army Gold Medal with one clasp.

Upon his return from the war, having been promoted to major-general in 1811, Kemmis took up a staff position in Ireland rising to command the Centre District. He retired in 1819 and died one year later in Cheltenham, Gloucester.

== Personal life ==
Kemmis and his wife had no children; she died on 24 June 1810 in Southampton. Whilst in the army he was not a popular officer, and was accused by one of his juniors of involvement "with the wife of a common soldier". He was also known for his anti-papist views. However, according to a family tradition of artist George Rowe (1796-1862), Kemmis adopted the daughter of an English soldier in his division who died while serving in the Peninsula War, Seville on the day his daughter was born. The soldier's wife accompanying him in his foreign deployment died on the same day after hearing of her husband's death. Kemmis was to adopt Philippa, together with his sister, who continued to raise her in Cheltenham after Kemmis' death. Philippa was to marry renowned Cheltenham topographical artist and lithographer George Rowe. <Blake, Stephen.1982, p. 9>
