= 4th Infantry Division (United Kingdom) =

British Army formation

4th Division; 4th Infantry Division; 4th Armoured Division
- Shoulder sleeve insignia of the 4th Division, 1995 onwards
- Active: 1809–2012
- Country: United Kingdom
- Branch: British Army
- Engagements: Napoleonic Wars; Battle of Talavera; Battle of Albuera; Battle of Badajoz; Battle of Salamanca; Battle of Roncesvalles; Battle of Vittoria; Battle of the Pyrenees; Battle of Orthez; Battle of Toulouse; Battle of Waterloo; Crimean War; Battle of Alma; Battle of Inkerman; Battle of Balaclava; Second Boer War; Siege of Ladysmith; Battle of Bergendal; First World War; Western Front; Battle of Le Cateau; Battle of the Marne; Retreat from Mons; First Battle of the Aisne; First Battle of Ypres; Battle of Messines; Capture of Hill 60; Second Battle of Ypres; Battle of Albert; Battle of Le Transloy; Battle of the Somme; Battle of Arras; First Battle of the Scarpe; Second Battle of the Scarpe; Battle of Polygon Wood; Battle of Broodseinde; Battle of Poelcapelle; Battle of Passchendaele; Second Battle of the Somme; Battle of the Lys; Battle of the Scarpe; Battle of Drocourt-Quéant Line; Battle of the Canal du Nord; Battle of the Selle; Battle of Valenciennes; Second World War; Western Front; Battle of France; Italian campaign; Trasimene Line; Gothic Line; Battle of Monte Cassino

Insignia
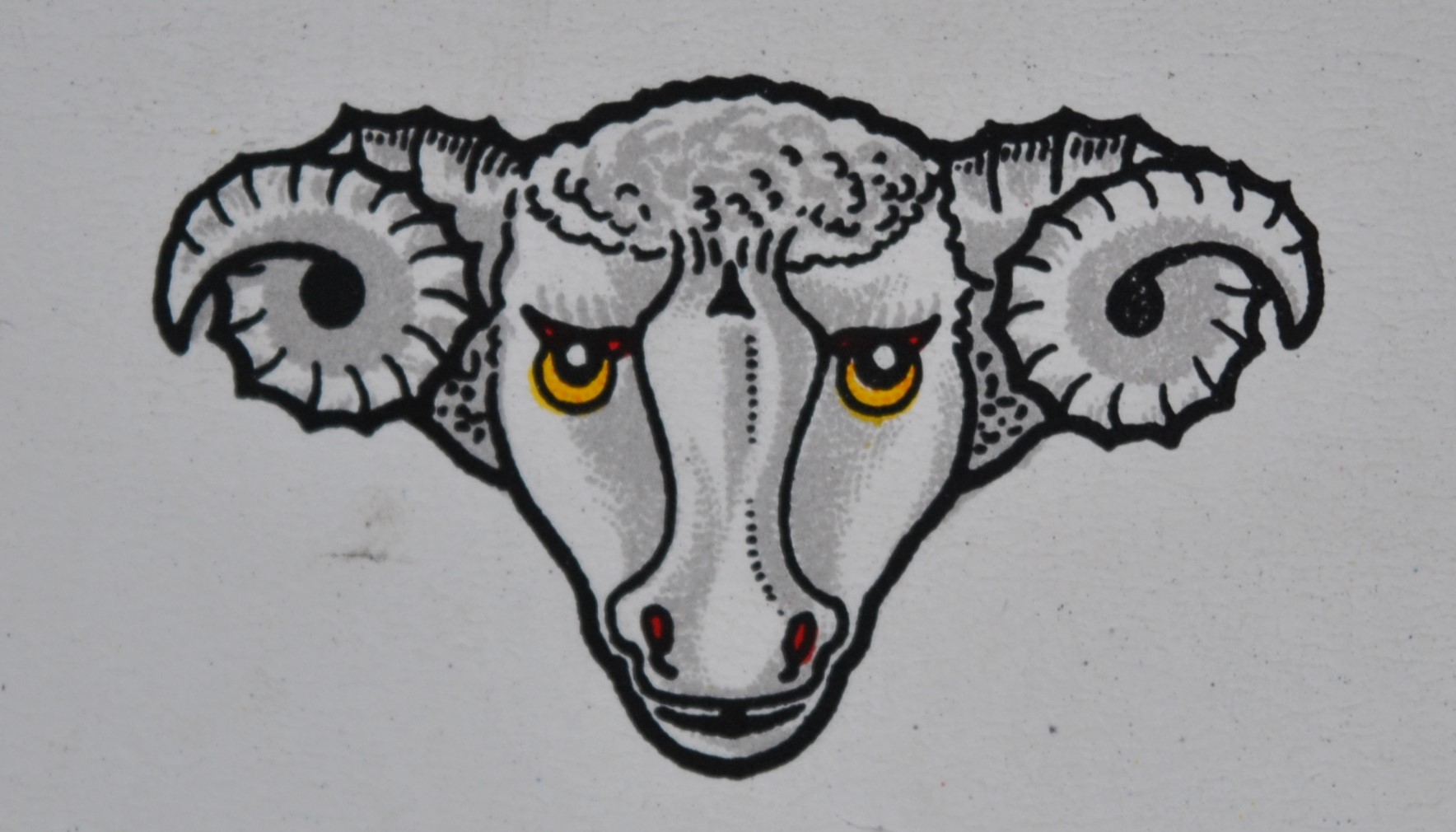
- First World War

- c. 1939–1990s

The 4th Infantry Division was a regular infantry division of the British Army with a very long history, seeing active service in the Peninsular War and Waterloo Campaign, the Crimean and Boer Wars and both World Wars. It was disbanded after the Second World War and reformed in the 1950s as an armoured formation before being disbanded and reformed again and finally disbanded on 1 January 2012.

== Napoleonic Wars ==
The 4th Division was originally formed in 1809 by Arthur Wellesley, 1st Duke of Wellington, as part of the Anglo-Portuguese Army, for service in the Peninsular War. It fought in the Battles of Talavera, Salamanca, Roncesvalles, Vitoria, the Pyrenees, Orthez, and Toulouse, and the siege of Badajoz.

=== Peninsular War order of battle ===
The order of battle from January 1812 was as follows:

Major General Sir Charles Colville (to April 1812) Major General Lowry Cole (from June 1812)

- 1st Brigade: Major General James Kemmis
  - 3/27th (Inniskilling) Regiment of Foot
  - 1/40th (2nd Somersetshire) Regiment of Foot
  - 1/48th (Northamptonshire) Regiment of Foot (from October 1812)
  - 2nd Provisional Battalion (2nd & 1/53rd Regiments of Foot) (from December 1812)
  - 1 Coy., 5/60th (Royal American) Regiment of Foot
- 2nd Brigade: Major General Sir Edward Pakenham
  - 1/7th Regiment of Foot (Royal Fusiliers)
  - 2/7th Regiment of Foot (Royal Fusiliers) (November 1810 to May 1811)
  - 20th (East Devonshire) Regiment of Foot (from November 1812)
  - 1/23rd Regiment of Foot (Royal Welsh Fusiliers)
  - 1/48th (Northamptonshire) Regiment of Foot (to October 1812)
  - 1/82nd Regiment of Foot (Prince of Wales's Volunteers) (October to November 1812)
  - 1 Coy., Brunswick-Oels Jaegers
- 3rd Brigade: Major General Skerrett (October to December 1812)
  - 3/1st Foot Guards
  - 2/47th (Lancashire) Regiment of Foot
  - 2/87th (Prince of Wales's Irish) Regiment of Foot
  - 2 Cos., 2/95th Regiment of Foot (Rifles)
- Portuguese Brigade: Major General Collins
  - 1/11th Line Infantry of the Portuguese Army
  - 2/11th Line Infantry of the Portuguese Army
  - 1/23rd Line Infantry of the Portuguese Army
  - 2/23rd Line Infantry of the Portuguese Army
  - 7th Caçadores of the Portuguese Army

=== Waterloo ===
At the Battle of Waterloo it was tasked with holding Wellington's right flank and, with the exception of its 4th brigade, took no active part in the fighting, but did capture the town of Cambrai afterwards. The commanding general at this time was Charles Colville. In his novel Les Misérables Victor Hugo credits Colville with asking for the surrender of the Imperial Guard at Waterloo and receiving General Cambronne's reply of "Merde".

=== Waterloo order of battle ===
- Commanding General Major-General Sir Charles Colville
- 4th Brigade – Lieutenant-Colonel Hugh Henry Mitchell
  - 3/14th (Buckinghamshire) Regiment of Foot
  - 1/23rd Regiment of Foot (Royal Welch Fusiliers)
  - 51st (2nd Yorkshire West Riding) Regiment of Foot (Light Infantry)
- 6th Brigade – Major-General George Johnstone
  - 2/35th (Sussex) Regiment of Foot
  - 54th (West Norfolk) Regiment of Foot
  - 59th (2nd Nottinghamshire) Regiment of Foot
  - 1/91st (Argyllshire) Regiment of Foot
- 6th Hanoverian Brigade – Major-General Sir James Lyon
  - Field Battalion Calenberg
  - Field Battalion Lauenburg
  - Landwehr Battalion Bentheim
  - Landwehr Battalion Hoya
  - Landwehr Battalion Nienburg

== Crimean War ==
The Division was also called for service during the Crimean War fought between the allied forces of the United Kingdom, French Empire and the Ottoman Empire on one side and Russia on the other. It saw action in the Battle of Alma the Battle of Inkerman and the Battle of Balaclava, fought on 25 October 1854 (famous for the Charge of the Light Brigade and the Thin Red Line).

=== Crimean War order of battle ===
Commanding General: Major General Sir George Cathcart

- 7th Brigade: Brigadier General Torrens
  - 20th (East Devonshire) Regiment of Foot
  - 21st Royal Scots Fusiliers
  - 68th (Durham) Regiment of Foot (Light Infantry)
- 8th Brigade
  - 46th (South Devonshire) Regiment of Foot
  - 57th (West Middlesex) Regiment of Foot
- one field battery royal Artillery

== Second Boer War ==
The Army Corps sent from Britain on the outbreak of the Second Boer War in 1899 comprised three divisions (six brigades) while the troops already in South Africa were intended to constitute a 4th Division of three brigades. However, the troops intended to form the 7th and 8th Brigades became caught up in the Siege of Ladysmith. (The 9th Brigade fought at the Battle of Modder River under Lord Methuen and later joined his 1st Division.) It was only after the Relief of Ladysmith in March 1900 that the 4th Division under the command of Lieutenant-General the Hon Neville Lyttelton was formed from the garrison and joined the Natal Field Force. It was sometimes known as the 'Ladysmith Division'.

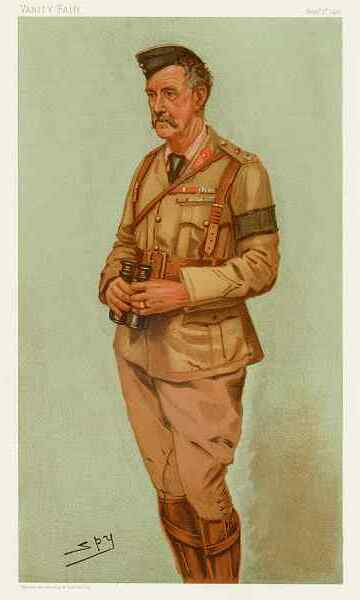
'4th Division'. Caricature of Lt-Gen Neville Lyttelton by 'Spy', published in Vanity Fair in 1901.

=== Order of Battle ===
The division was constituted as follows:

7th Brigade

- Brigadier-General Walter Kitchener
- 1st Battalion, Devonshire Regiment
- 1st Battalion, Manchester Regiment
- 2nd Battalion, Gordon Highlanders
- 2nd Battalion, Rifle Brigade (Prince Consort's Own)

8th Brigade

- Major-General Francis Howard
- 1st Battalion, King's (Liverpool Regiment)
- 1st Battalion, Leicestershire Regiment
- 1st Battalion, Royal Inniskilling Fusiliers – not from the Ladysmith Garrison
- 1st Battalion, King's Royal Rifle Corps

Divisional troops

- 2nd Brigade-Division, Royal Field Artillery
  - 21st, 42nd and 53rd Batteries
- 2 x Naval 12-pounder guns
- 23rd Company, Royal Engineers

=== Service ===
The troops of 4th Division were still sickly after the Siege of Ladysmith, and it played little part in Sir Redvers Buller's operations to clear the Boers out of Natal in May and June. It was then left to defend Natal when Buller advanced into Transvaal in July. The division was not complete until 5 August when Walter Kitchener's 7th Brigade caught up. It marched out next day with Buller towards Balmoral to link up with Lord Roberts's Army. The division fought an engagement with the Boers on the way to Amersfoort on 7 August, then carried out a 10-day march via Ermelo, skirmishing every day, with the opposition increasing as the column advanced. On 22 August Walter Kitchener was detached with part of his brigade to clear some troublesome Kopjes on the flank, and next day section of 21st Battery, RFA, was heavily engaged with Boer guns. The division joined up with Roberts on 27 August, when 7th Brigade assaulted an entrenched position on the Berg-en-dal kopje.

The Battle of Bergendal was the last set-piece action of the war, but was followed by a long period of Guerrilla warfare. British forces were increasingly dispersed into ad hoc columns pursuing small Boer forces. Lyttelton's division was reduced to five-and-a-half battalions and a Mounted infantry detachment for Buller's advance to Lydenburg in September. On 5 September 7 Brigade's camp came under long range artillery fire, but Howard and the artillery cleared the Boers away. The column entered Lydenburg on 7 September, then attacked Paardeplaats next day, when Lyttelton with his four remaining battalions attacked the Boer right. Buller's column then marched into the rugged country of North East Transvaal through the 'Devil's Knuckles' and 'Hell's Gate' before returning to Lydenburg on 2 October, capturing a large Boer supply column on the way.

Roberts and Buller returned to the UK In early October and Lyttelton took over command of Buller's forces scattered in small garrisons guarding the Natal–Delagoa Bay Railway. The brigade and divisional organisation was abandoned for the rest of the war.

== First World War ==
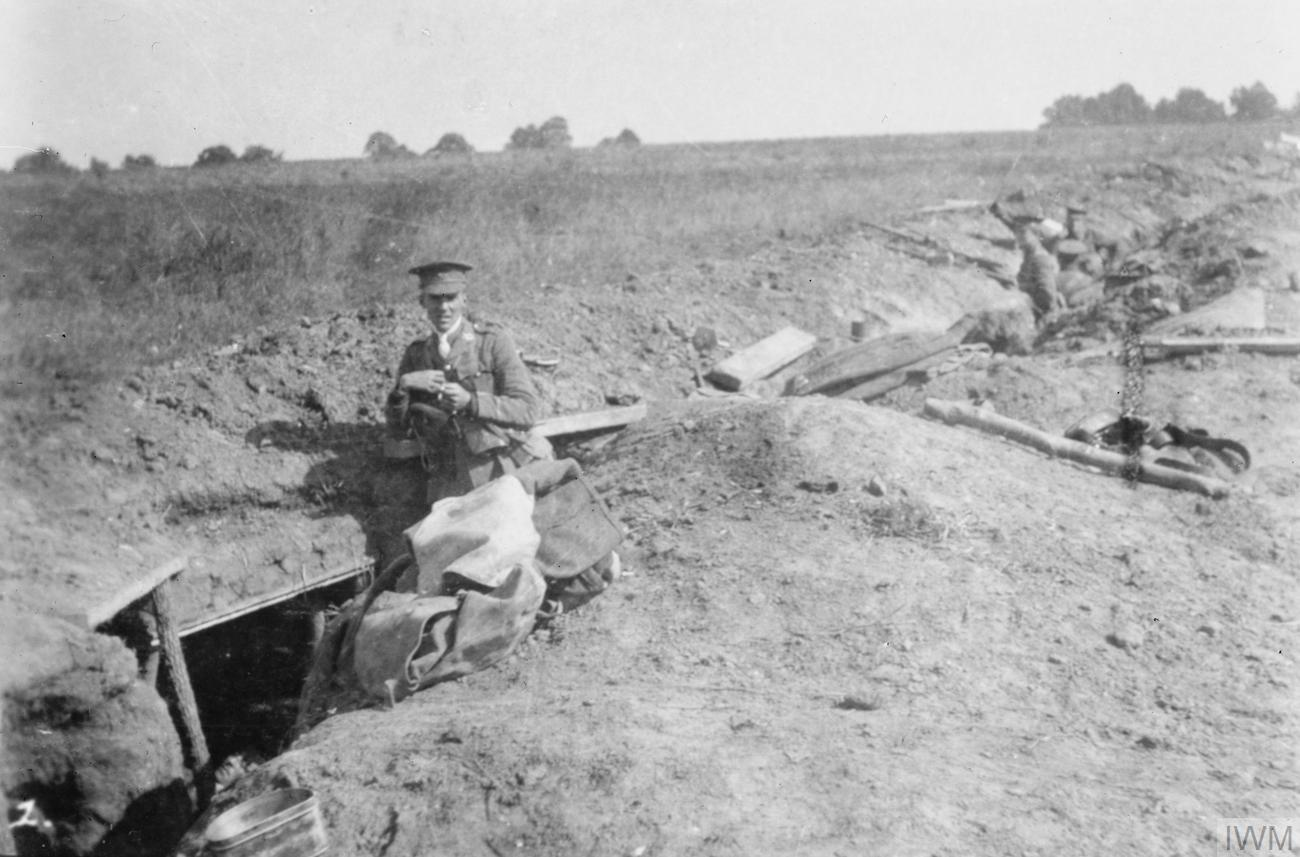
Troops of the 1st Battalion, King's Own (Royal Lancaster Regiment) in the front trench at St. Marguerite, 22 September 1914. The officer is Second Lieutenant R. C. Matthews, probably the Officer Commanding "A" Company.

As a permanently established Regular Army division it was amongst the first to be sent to France as part of the British Expeditionary Force at the outbreak of the First World War. It served on the Western Front for the duration of the war and was present during all the major offensives including the Battle of the Marne, Battle of Ypres, Battle of the Somme and the Battle of Passchendaele.

=== Order of battle ===
The order of battle of 4th Division during the First World War was as follows:

10th Brigade

- 1st Battalion, Royal Warwickshire Regiment
- 2nd Battalion, Seaforth Highlanders
- 1st Battalion, Royal Irish Fusiliers (left August 1917)
- 2nd Battalion, Royal Dublin Fusiliers (left November 1916)
- 10th Machine Gun Company, Machine Gun Corps (formed 22 December 1915, moved to 4th Battalion, Machine Gun Corps 26 February 1918)
- 10th Trench Mortar Battery (formed June 1916)
- 1/7th Battalion, Argyll and Sutherland Highlanders (from January 1915 until March 1916)
- 1/9th Battalion, Argyll and Sutherland Highlanders (from May to July 1915)
- Household Battalion (from November 1916 until February 1918)
- 3/10th Battalion, Middlesex Regiment (from August 1917 until February 1918)
- 2nd Battalion, Duke of Wellington's (West Riding Regiment) (from February 1918)

11th Brigade

- 1st Battalion, Somerset Light Infantry
- 1st Battalion, East Lancashire Regiment (left February 1918)
- 1st Battalion, Hampshire Regiment
- 1st Battalion, Rifle Brigade (Prince Consort's Own)
- 1/5th (City of London) Battalion, London Regiment (London Rifle Brigade) (from November 1914 until May 1915)
- 2nd Battalion, Royal Irish Regiment (from July 1915 until May 1916)
- 11th Battalion, Machine Gun Corps (formed 23 December 1915, moved to 4th Battalion, Machine Gun Corps 26 February 1918)
- 11th Trench Mortar Battery (formed June 1916)

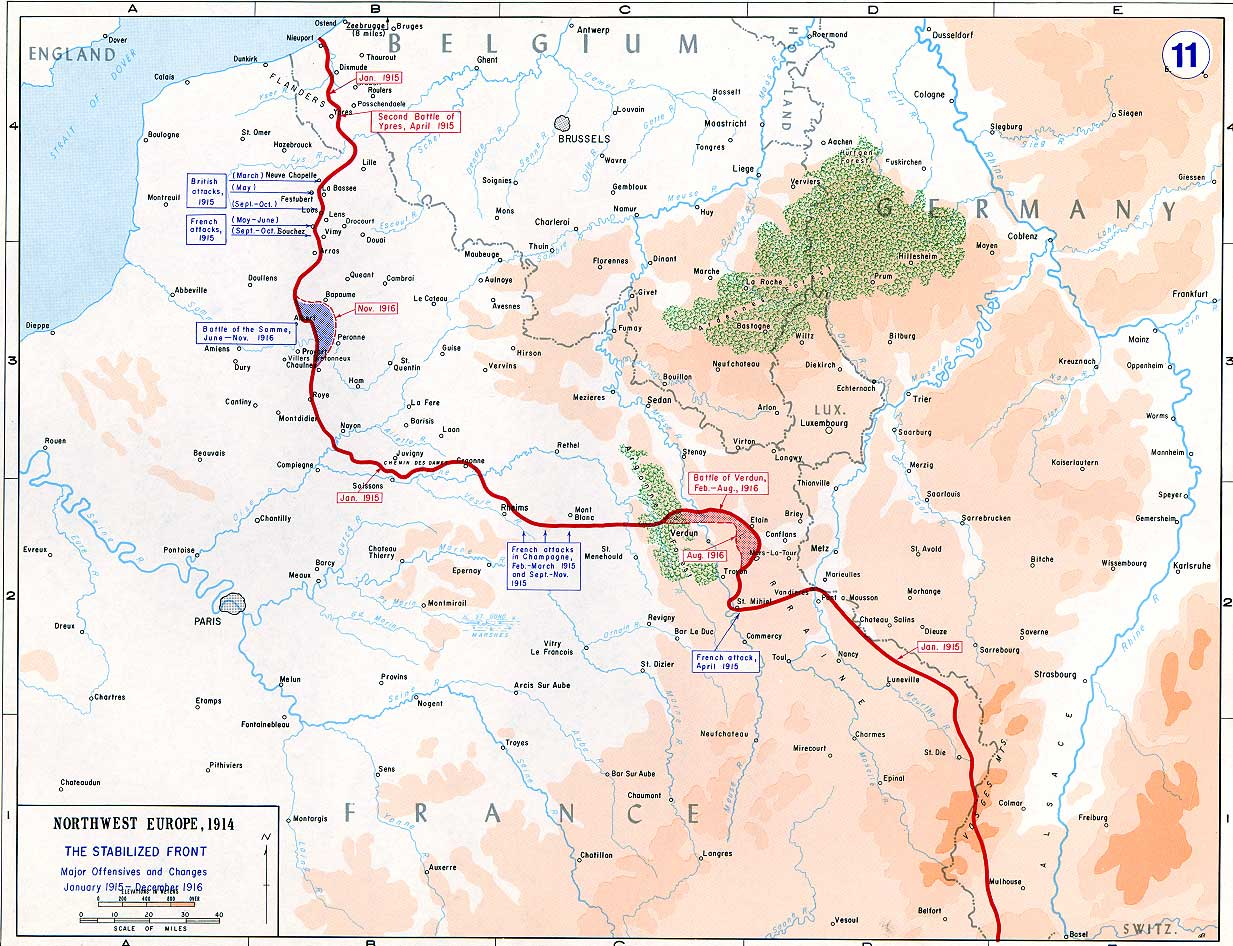
Map of the Western Front, 1915–16

12th Brigade

- 1st Battalion, King's Own Royal Regiment (Lancaster)
- 2nd Battalion, Lancashire Fusiliers
- 2nd Battalion, Royal Inniskilling Fusiliers (left December 1914)
- 2nd Battalion, Essex Regiment
- 1/2nd Battalion, Monmouthshire Regiment (until January 1916)
- 1/5th Battalion, South Lancashire Regiment (from February 1915 until January 1916)
- 12th Machine Gun Company, Machine Gun Corps (formed 24 January 1916, moved to 4th Battalion, Machine Gun Corps 26 February 1918)
- 12th Trench Mortar Battery (formed 11 June 1916)
- 2nd Battalion, Duke of Wellington's (West Riding Regiment) (from January 1916 to 10th Bde. February 1918)
- 2nd Battalion, Royal Irish Regiment (from March until July 1915)

From early November 1915 until February 1916 the 12th Brigade was swapped with the 107th Brigade of the 36th (Ulster) Division.

Artillery

- XIV Brigade, Royal Field Artillery (until 14 January 1917)
- XXIX Brigade, Royal Field Artillery
- XXXII Brigade, Royal Field Artillery
- XXXVII (Howitzer) Brigade, Royal Field Artillery (until 17 February 1915)
- CXXVII (Howitzer) Brigade, Royal Field Artillery (from 6 August 1915 until 21 May 1916)
- 31st Heavy Battery, Royal Garrison Artillery (until 29 April 1915)

Engineers

- 7th Field Company, Royal Engineers (until 29 April 1915)
- 9th Field Company, Royal Engineers
- 1st West Lancashire Field Company, Royal Engineers (from 14 February 1915 until 28 February 1916)
- 1st Renfrew Field Company, Royal Engineers (joined 2 May 1916; became 406th (Renfrew) Field Company 3 February 1917)
- 1st Durham Field Company, Royal Engineers (joined 20 September 1916; became 526th (Durham) Field Company 3 February 1917)

Pioneers

- 21st (Service) Battalion, West Yorkshire Regiment (from 21 June 1916)

== Second World War ==
=== France and Belgium ===
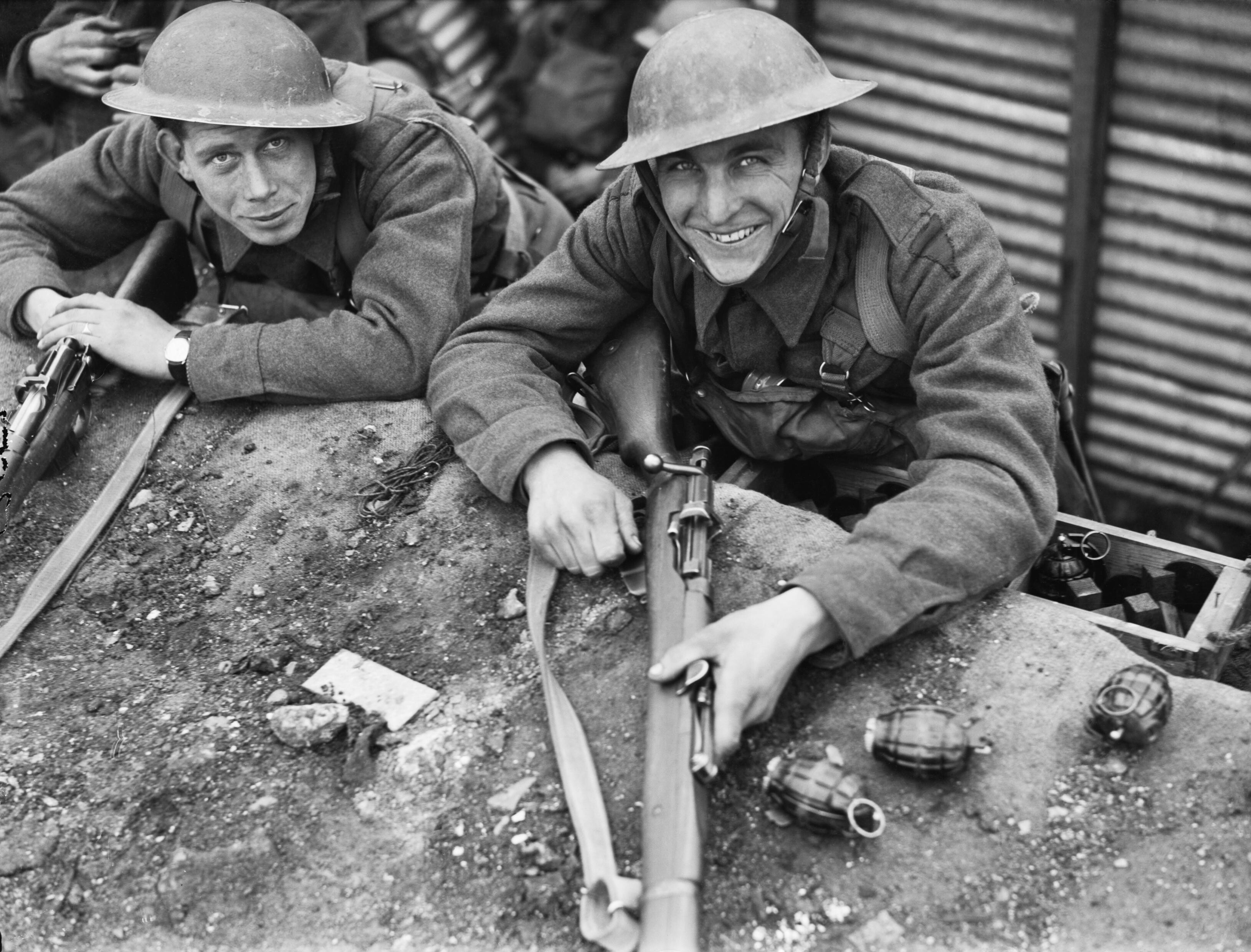
Men of the 1st Battalion, Queen's Own Royal West Kent Regiment in a section of trench named 'Pudding Lane', 4th Division near Roubaix, 3 April 1940. Note the hand grenades ready for use.

Shortly after the outbreak of the Second World War in September 1939 the 4th Division, under Major General Dudley Johnson, who had won the Victoria Cross (VC) in the Great War, was sent to the border between France and Belgium as part of Lieutenant-General Alan Brooke's II Corps of the British Expeditionary Force (BEF). All three of the division's brigades were commanded by distinguished soldiers, the 10th by Brigadier Evelyn Barker, the 11th by Brigadier Kenneth Anderson and the 12th by Brigadier John Hawkesworth. After the disastrous Battle of France in May–June 1940, where the division sustained heavy losses, and the evacuation at Dunkirk, it spent the next two years in the United Kingdom on anti-invasion duties and training for its next deployment.

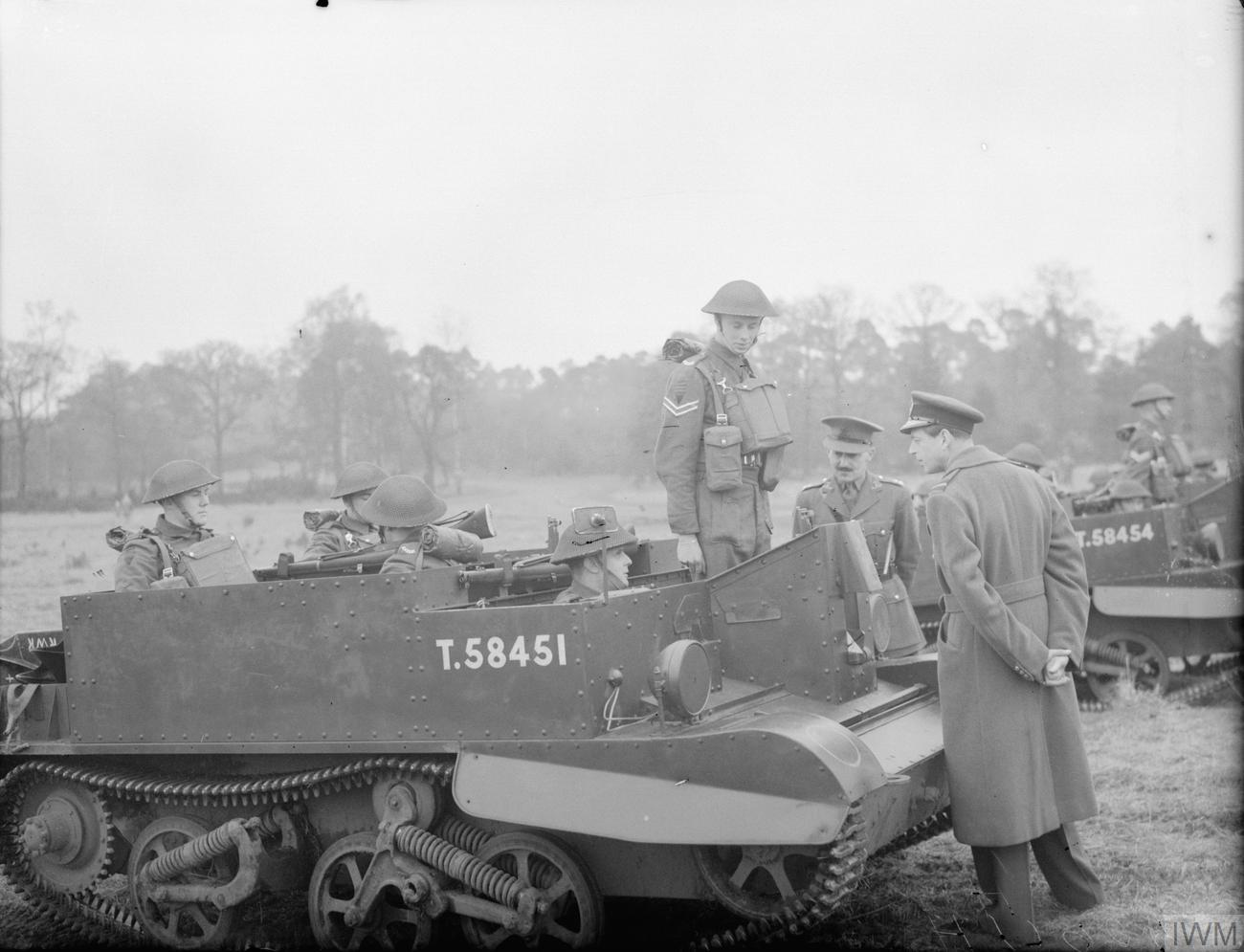
The Duke of Kent inspects Universal Carriers of the 1st Battalion, Queen's Own Royal West Kent Regiment, at Camberley, Surrey, 16 March 1942.

In June 1942 the division, now under Major General John Hawkesworth, was selected to be converted into a 'mixed' division, consisting of two infantry brigades and one tank brigade. As a result of this change, the divisions' 11th Infantry Brigade left the division and was replaced by the 21st Army Tank Brigade.

=== North Africa ===
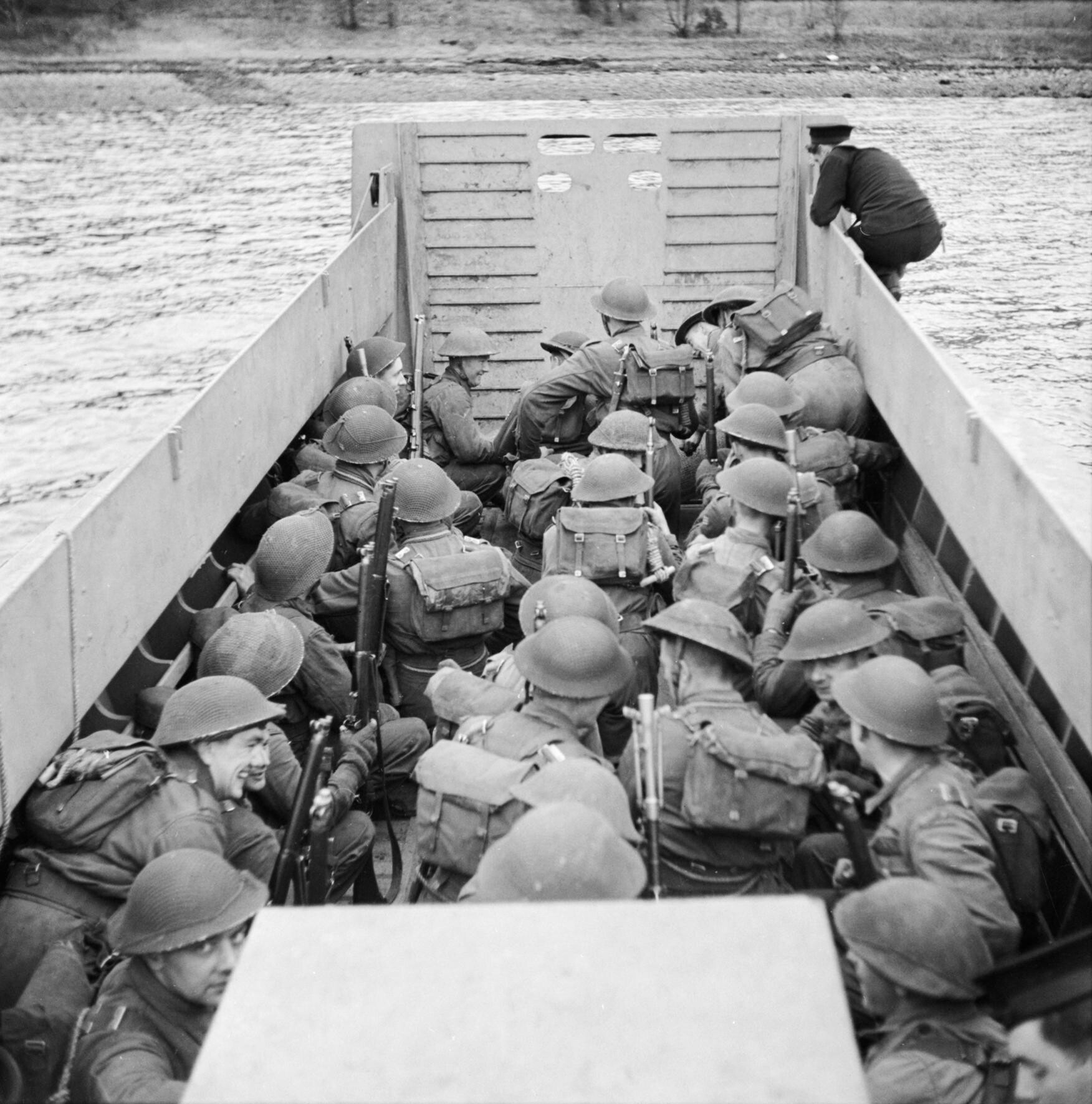
Men of the 6th Battalion, Black Watch crouch down in a landing craft as it approaches the shore, during combined operations training in Scotland, 17 November 1942.

The division departed for North Africa in early 1943, arriving in Tunisia in March, coming under Lieutenant-General John Crocker's IX Corps, part of the British First Army. During the Tunisian Campaign it was involved in Operation Vulcan, the final ground attack against Axis forces in North Africa which ended the North African Campaign, with the surrender of nearly 250,000 German and Italian soldiers. During the assault the division suffered heavy losses, with four battalions sustaining over 300 casualties. After the Axis defeat in North Africa, in May 1943, the division was to remain there for the next 9 months, during which time it was converted back into a standard infantry division, with the 28th Infantry Brigade, consisting mainly of Regular Army battalions who had served on garrison duties in Gibraltar, arriving to replace the 21st Tank Brigade.

=== Italy ===
The division arrived on the Italian Front in late February 1944, relieving the British 46th Infantry Division, initially coming under command of Lieutenant-General Richard McCreery's British X Corps, then serving under the U.S. Fifth Army. In March the division transferred to Lieutenant-General Sidney Kirkman's British XIII Corps, part of the British Eighth Army. The division, now under the command of Major-General Alfred Dudley Ward, fought with distinction at the fourth and final Battle of Monte Cassino in May 1944, and later in severe fighting in the battles for the Gothic Line. During the battle of Cassino Captain Richard Wakeford of the 2/4th Battalion, Hampshire Regiment was awarded the Victoria Cross.

=== Greece ===
However, in November 1944 it was dispatched, with the rest of III Corps, to Greece to provide assistance during the Greek Civil War, and was to remain there until the end of the war in Europe in May 1945.

=== Order of battle ===
The 4th Infantry Division was constituted as follows during the war

10th Infantry Brigade

- 2nd Battalion, Bedfordshire and Hertfordshire Regiment
- 2nd Battalion, Duke of Cornwall's Light Infantry
- 1st Battalion, Queen's Own Royal West Kent Regiment (left 3 May 1940)
- 10th Infantry Brigade Anti-Tank Company (joined 4th Battalion Reconnaissance Corps 1 January 1941 )
- 1/6th Battalion, East Surrey Regiment (from 4 May 1940)

11th Infantry Brigade (left 5 June 1942)

- 2nd Battalion, Lancashire Fusiliers
- 1st Battalion, East Surrey Regiment
- 1st Battalion, Oxfordshire and Buckinghamshire Light Infantry (left 29 January 1940)
- 11th Infantry Brigade Anti-Tank Company (joined 4th Battalion Reconnaissance Corps 1 January 1941)
- 5th (Huntingdonshire) Battalion, Northamptonshire Regiment (from 29 January 1940)

12th Infantry Brigade

- 2nd Battalion, Royal Fusiliers
- 1st Battalion, South Lancashire Regiment (left 13 June 1940)
- 1st Battalion, Black Watch (Royal Highland Regiment) (left 4 March 1940)
- 12th Infantry Brigade Anti-Tank Company (joined 4th Battalion Reconnaissance Corps 1 January 1941)
- 6th Battalion, Black Watch (Royal Highland Regiment) (from 4 March 1940)
- 1st Battalion, Queen's Own Royal West Kent Regiment (from 5 September 1940)

21st Army Tank Brigade (from 6 June 1942, left 12 December 1943)

- 12th Royal Tank Regiment
- 48th Royal Tank Regiment
- 145th Regiment Royal Armoured Corps

28th Infantry Brigade (from 24 December 1943)

- 2nd Battalion, King's Regiment (Liverpool)
- 2nd Battalion, Somerset Light Infantry
- 1st Battalion, Argyll and Sutherland Highlanders (from 5 January, left 2 February 1944)
- 2/4th Battalion, Hampshire Regiment (from 24 March 1943)

Divisional Troops

- 5th Dragoon Guards (Reconnaissance Battalion, left 31 March 1940)
- 4th Battalion, Reconnaissance Corps (formed from 10th, 11th and 12th Brigade Anti-Tank Companies 1 January 1941, redesignated 4th Regiment 6 June 1942, became 4th Reconnaissance Regiment, Royal Armoured Corps 1 January 1944)
- 2nd Battalion, Royal Northumberland Fusiliers (joined as Machine Gun Battalion from 11 November 1941, left 20 May 1942, rejoined as Support Battalion 10 March 1944, became MG Battalion from 7 June 1944)
- 17th Field Regiment, Royal Artillery (left 19 February 1940)
- 22nd Field Regiment, Royal Artillery
- 30th Field Regiment, Royal Artillery
- 77th (Highland) Field Regiment, Royal Artillery (from 19 February 1940)
- 14th Anti-Tank Regiment, Royal Artillery
- 91st Light Anti-Aircraft Regiment, Royal Artillery (from 26 January 1942, disbanded 6 November 1944)
- 7th Field Company, Royal Engineers
- 9th Field Company, Royal Engineers (left 16 February 1940)
- 59th Field Company, Royal Engineers
- 225th Field Company, Royal Engineers (from 16 February 1940)
- 18th Field Park Company, Royal Engineers
- 3rd Bridging Platoon, Royal Engineers (from 18 October 1943)
- 4th Divisional Signals, Royal Corps of Signals

== Post War and Cold War ==
The 4th Infantry Division remained in Greece, during the Greek Civil War. During its time in Greece, the division was deployed to Attica. In February 1946, it moved to the northern part of the country after the 4th Indian Division returned to India. It was relieved by the 13th Infantry Division in Attica. The following month, it was disbanded while still in Greece.

In Germany, on 1 April 1956, the 4th Infantry Division was reformed at Herford following the conversion and redesignation of the 11th Armoured Division (the latter division's 91st Lorried Infantry Brigade was reorganised as the 12th Infantry Brigade in the process of joining the 4th Infantry Division). The newly formed division, now part of the British Army of the Rhine (BAOR), was also allocated the lorried infantry brigades of the 6th and the 7th Armoured Divisions. Two years later, following the disbanding of different BAOR formations and further restructuring, the division comprised the 4th (Guards), the 5th Infantry, and the 20th Armoured Brigades. Around this time period, the term "infantry" was dropped from the division's title so that it was known simply as the 4th Division. During February 1963, the division undertook Exercise Iron Bar, which trialed merging the divisional headquarters with the divisional signal regiment. It proved successful and became permanent in 1965, followed by Exercise Open Glove to further test the arrangement. By the 1970s, the division consisted of the 6th and 20th Armoured Brigades.

== Armoured division ==
Order of battle of the 4th UK Armoured Division in 1989.

The 1975 Mason Review, a government white paper, outlined a new defence policy that restructured the BAOR. As a result, on 1 January 1978, the 4th Division was renamed the 4th Armoured Division. It then restructured to consist of two armoured regiments, three mechanised infantry battalions, and two artillery regiments, as the Mason Review had removed brigades and replaced them with a concept of task forces or battlegroups. It was intended that the division could form up to five battlegroups, with each commanded by either an armoured regiment or an infantry battalion. These groups were to be formed for a specific task and allocated the required forces needed. The divisional commander (general officer commanding (GOC)) would oversee these battlegroups, but early training showed this to be impractical. To compensate, the divisional headquarters was increased to 750 men (wartime strength) and included two brigadiers. Each officer would command a flexible task force, which consisted of the battlegroups the GOC had formed. The division's task forces were named Task Force Golf and Task Force Hotel. These were not a reintroduction of a brigade command structure and had no administrative responsibilities. The approach intended to provide greater flexibility in tailoring forces to meet unforeseen events and allow for an overall reduction in the size of a division by 700 men. The task force concept was dropped by the end of the decade, having been deemed to have not met expectations. With the reintroduction of brigades, the division consisted of the 11th Armoured Brigade (based at Minden) that comprised one armoured regiment and two mechanised infantry battalions, and the 20th Armoured Brigade (located in Detmold) that consisted of two armoured regiments and one mechanised infantry battalion.

By 1983, the division had been assigned the 19th Infantry Brigade, which was located in Colchester, England. This brigade was subsequently switched with the 3rd Armoured Division's 33rd Armoured Brigade (based at Paderborn), to bring the 4th Armoured Division up to a strength of three armoured brigades and with all its troops located in Germany. The end of the 1980s saw the dissolution of the Soviet Union and the end of the Cold War. In July 1990, the British government announced Options for Change. This framework sought to restructure the British military based on the new strategic situation, allow for further cost saving measures to be enacted, and to reduce the BAOR by half. In July 1993, this resulted in the division being redesignated and becoming the 1st (UK) Armoured Division, and the 4th Armoured Division ceased to exist.

== Final decades ==
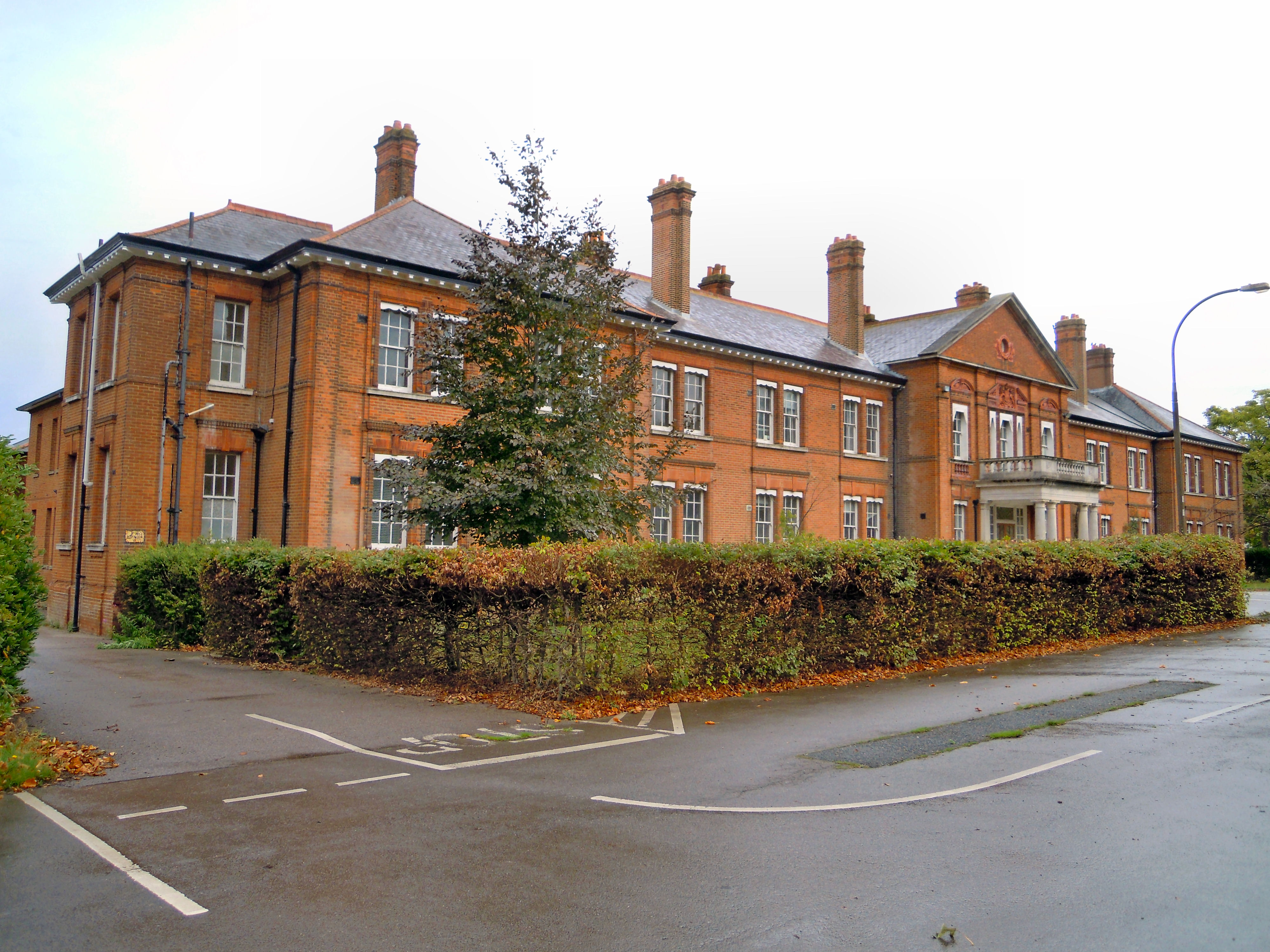
The Military Headquarters Building, where the division's headquarters was based, at Aldershot.

During the mid-1990s, the British Army further restructured. Various regional districts were replaced by several regionally based divisions, which included the reformed 4th Division. Alongside the 2nd and the 5th Divisions, the 4th was dubbed a "regenerative" formation; holding administrative and training responsibilities for all non-deployed forces located within its geographical boundaries (the south east and parts of eastern England, excluding the Greater London area). In the event of a major international crisis, the formation would be used as the core to form a combat-ready division around. On reformation (1 April 1995), the division was headquartered at Aldershot and adopted a tiger as its insignia. It comprised the 2nd Brigade (headquartered at Shorncliffe Army Camp), the 24th Airmobile Brigade (Colchester), and the 145th Infantry Brigade (Aldershot). At the time, it was between 13,400 and 14,400 strong and the largest British formation based in the UK. It also contained 26 Challenger I tanks, 154 artillery pieces, in addition to other weapon systems and vehicles.

The 1998 Strategic Defence Review resulted in several changes. The 24th (Airmobile) Brigade was merged with the 5th (Airborne) Brigade to form the 16 Air Assault Brigade in 1999. While this brigade was administered by the division, its operational command was held by Land Command. On 1 April 2000, the boundaries of the division were expanded so that it then over oversaw London District (for budgetary purposes) and it took command of the 49th (Eastern) Brigade. During 2007, the division's boundaries were again changed, resulting in the loss of Colchester Garrison (as well as administering the 16th Air Assault Brigade based there) and the 49th (Eastern) Brigade. In return the formation's region was expanded west, so that it gained the 43rd (Wessex) Brigade. The 145th Infantry Brigade was renamed the 145th (South) Brigade, and the division was given administrative control over the Brunei garrison and the British Gurkhas Nepal organisation.

The Strategic Defence and Security Review of 2010 identified that the army had had become optimised for operations in Afghanistan, but in order to meet potential future threats would need to be reorganised to become more flexible. This restructure was called Army 2020 and resulted in the decision to disband the three regional regenerative divisions, to be replaced by Support Command, with the aim of making the home-based forces better able to support any deployed troops. During January 2012, the 4th Division was disbanded (followed by the 2nd and the 5th Divisions in April).

== See also ==
- List of commanders of the British 4th Division
- List of British divisions in World War I
- List of British divisions in World War II
- British Army Order of Battle (September 1939)
