= John Graham (British Army officer, born 1923) =

British Army officer (1923–2012)

Major-General John Graham CB CBE CStJ
- Born: 18 January 1923
- Died: 14 December 2012 (aged 89)
- Military career
- Allegiance: United Kingdom
- Branch: British Army
- Rank: Major-General
- Service number: 243024
- Units: Home Guard; Argyll and Sutherland Highlanders; Parachute Regiment
- Commands: 1st Battalion, Parachute Regiment; Wales
- Conflicts: Second World War; Palestine Emergency
- Awards: Companion of the Order of the Bath; Commander of the Order of the British Empire

Major-General John David Carew Graham, CB, CBE, CStJ (18 January 1923 – 14 December 2012) was a British Army officer who was instrumental in the installation of Qaboos bin Said as Sultan of Oman in the 1970 Omani coup d'état.

== Early career ==
Born on 18 January 1923, the eldest of three sons of Colonel J. A. Graham and Constance Mary Carew-Hunt, John Graham was educated at Cheltenham College 1936–1940 and, during the Second World War, he served with the Isle of Wight Home Guard, before enlisting as a private into the Argyll and Sutherland Highlanders of the British Army in August 1941. On 21 August 1942, he was commissioned into the 2nd Battalion of that regiment. Graham served with the battalion, which formed part of the 227th Infantry Brigade of the 15th (Scottish) Infantry Division, in North West Europe, where he was wounded during Operation Plunder and mentioned in despatches. Following the war, he served in Palestine during the Palestine Emergency with the 1st Battalion of his regiment.

In late 1948 he was sent to London to learn Czech prior to working in the British Embassy in Prague 1949–1950. There he clandestinely assessed the Czech Armed Forces activities, including the building of airfields, barracks and the adaptation of the Czech-gauge railway lines to take Russian rolling stock, all at a time of great tension, when a Soviet attack on war-exhausted western Europe was thought by many to be inevitable and imminent.

Later he worked in the British Government Communications Headquarters (GCHQ) in London. He transferred to the Parachute Regiment where was appointed Second-in-Command of the regiment's 2nd Battalion and later Commanding Officer (CO) of the 1st Battalion (1964–1967).

== Oman ==
Promoted to Brigadier, he attended an army languages course to learn Arabic before he assumed command of the Sultan's Armed Forces (SAF), in Oman, in 1970.

Sultan Said bin Taimur, the Omani absolute ruler, had outlawed almost all aspects of twentieth-century development and relied on British support to maintain the rudimentary functions of the state. In 1962 a dissatisfied tribal leader, Mussalim bin Nafl, formed the Dhofar Liberation Front (DLF) and obtained arms and vehicles from Saudi Arabia, and the country had been in a state of rebellion ever since. Other insurgents in the north of Oman formed another organisation, the National Democratic Front for the Liberation of Oman and the Arabian Gulf (NDFLOAG). In June 1970 they attacked two SAF posts at Nizwa and Izki. They were repulsed but the incident convinced many (including the Sultan's British advisers and backers) that intervention was required.

On 23 July 1970, Said bin Taimur was deposed. The coup d'état succeeded because the Omani army's chief intelligence officer in the Dhofar, Brigadier John Graham, and Colonel Hugh Oldman, military (later defence) secretary and supreme commander of the army in Muscat, insisted that Said surrender. When Qaboos confronted his father, accompanied by Graham, shots were fired. The Sultan was flown out of Oman by the RAF to Bahrain.

On the morning after the Coup, it was Graham who took the minutes of the meeting of Sultan Qaboos' advisory cabinet. For his service, Graham received the Military Order of Oman in 1972.

== Later career ==
He became Assistant Chief of Staff, Joint Exercises, Allied Forces Central Europe in 1974 and, following promotion to major-general, he was appointed General Officer Commanding (GOC) Wales in 1976 before retiring in 1978.

== In retirement ==
After retiring from the army, he became Secretary to the Administrative Trustees of the Chevening Estate; Chairman of the St John Council for Kent of the St John's Ambulance; Honorary Colonel of the Kent Army Cadet Force and of the 203 (Welsh) General Hospital RAMC, as well as assisting the Staff of The Parachute Regiment at the Regimental HQ, Aldershot, before his retirement to Barbados in 1991.

In 1991, he retired to Barbados, West Indies. In 1992 he was made a freeman of the City of London. He died in Barbados on 14 December 2012.

== Family ==
He married Rosemary Elaine Adamson and had two children, Jacqueline ('Pinky'), b September 1957, and Christopher, b July 1959.

Military offices
Preceded by Peter Leuchars	GOC Wales; 1976−1978	Succeeded by Arthur Stewart-Cox
