= General Spencer =

General Spencer may refer to:

- Augustus Spencer (1807–1893), British Army general
- Brent Spencer (c. 1760–1828), British Army general
- Charles Spencer, 3rd Duke of Marlborough (1706–1758), British Army general
- Jeremy Spencer-Smith (1917–1985), British Army major general
- Joseph Spencer (1714–1789), Continental Army major general
- Larry O. Spencer (born 1954), U.S. Air Force general
