= Andrew Massey =

Andrew Massey may refer to:

- Andrew Massey (British Army officer) (1943–1998), British SAS officer
- Andrew Massey (conductor) (1946–2018), British conductor and composer
- Andy Massey (born 1961), English football midfielder
