= Morgan Llewellyn =

British Army officer (1937–2024)

Major-General The Reverend Morgan Llewellyn CB OBE OStJ DL
- Born: Richard Morgan Llewellyn; 22 August 1937
- Died: 10 December 2024 (aged 87)
- Military career
- Allegiance: United Kingdom
- Branch: British Army
- Service years: 1956 – 1991
- Rank: Major-General
- Service number: 450929
- Unit: Royal Welch Fusiliers
- Commands: 1st Battalion, Royal Welch Fusiliers; Gurkha Field Force; Wales
- Awards: Companion of the Order of the Bath (CB); Officer of the Order of the British Empire (OBE)
- Other work: Ordained into the Church of England

Richard Morgan Llewellyn, CB, OBE, OStJ, DL (22 August 1937 – 10 December 2024) was a senior British Army officer. He was general officer commanding, Wales District from 1987 to 1990, and chief of staff at HQ Land Forces from 1990 to 1991. Upon retirement from the army, he was ordained in the Church of England and was the Welsh Vice-Patron of the War Memorials Trust.

== Early life ==
Llewellyn was born on 22 August 1937, the son of Griffith Robert Poyntz Llewellyn and Bridget Margaret Lester Llewellyn (née Karslake). He spent his early years in Monmouthshire, Wales. From January 1951 to March 1955, he was educated at Haileybury and Imperial Service College, a private school in Hertfordshire, England. He was a member of Hailey house.

== Military career ==
For his national service, Llewellyn was commissioned into the Royal Welch Fusiliers as a second lieutenant on 1 December 1956. He was given the service number 450929. He served in Malaya in 1957, the year of its independence from Britain. He was promoted to lieutenant on 10 August 1958.

He moved from the National Service List to the Regular List on 22 August 1958 as a second lieutenant. On the same date he was promoted to lieutenant. He served in Cyprus from late 1958 to early 1959. He was an instructor at the Army Outward Bound School from 1962 to 1963. He was promoted to captain on 22 August 1964, and to major on 31 December 1969. He then attended Staff College in 1970. He was military assistant to the Chief of the General Staff, then General Sir Michael Carver, in 1971 and 1972. From 1974 to 1976, he served as brigade major, the chief of staff, for 39th Infantry Brigade. He was posted to Northern Ireland between 1 February and 30 April 1976.

He was promoted to lieutenant colonel on 30 June 1976. He was then appointed commanding officer of 1st Battalion, Royal Welch Fusiliers. He commanded the 700 military personnel who replaced firefighters during the 1977 Fire Brigades Union nationwide strike. He was once more posted to Northern Ireland between 1 February and 30 April 1979. He was a member of the directing staff of the Royal College of Defence Studies from late 1979 to 1981. He was promoted to brigadier on 31 December 1981, with seniority from 30 June 1981. Between December 1981 and January 1984, he was commanding officer of the Gurkha Field Force, based in Hong Kong. He was posted to the Ministry of Defence as deputy director of army staff duties from February 1984 to February 1985. He was the last person to hold that appointment. From February 1985 to January 1987, he remained at the MOD as director of army staff duties. He was the successor of the then Major General Brian Kenny.

On 1 December 1987, he was granted the acting rank of major general and appointed general officer commanding, Wales in succession to the then Major General Peter de la Billière. His promotion to major general was confirmed on 23 February 1988, with seniority from 16 October 1986. He relinquished the appointment of GOC Wales on 15 June 1990. From 16 June 1990 to 13 September 1991, he was chief of staff at HQ United Kingdom Land Forces. He held this role during the First Gulf War.

He retired from the British Army on 8 November 1991.

== Later life ==
In 1991, Llewellyn entered Sarum & Wells Theological College and spent two years training for ministry in the Church of England. He was ordained as a deacon in 1993, and as a priest in 1994. He was minor canon of Brecon Cathedral, under Bishop Dewi Bridges, from 1993 to 1995. From 1995 to 2001 or 2014, he was chaplain of the Welsh independent school Christ College, Brecon.

From 2001, was director of the Christ College Foundation, the bursaries and school improvements fund of Christ College, Brecon. He retired from the position in 2005. He was the Vice-Patron of the War Memorials Trust from 2001 until his death.

== Personal life and death ==
Llewellyn married Elizabeth Lamond Sobey in 1964. Together they had three sons and two daughters. One son, called Glyn, has also served as an officer of the British Army.

Llewellyn died from cancer on 10 December 2024, at the age of 87.

== Honours and decorations ==
On 12 October 1976, Llewellyn was appointed Member of the Order of the British Empire (MBE) "in recognition of distinguished services in Northern Ireland during the period 1st February - 30th April 1976". He was promoted to Officer of the Order of the British Empire (OBE) on 9 October 1979 "in recognition of distinguished service in Northern Ireland during the period 1st February 1979 to 30th April 1979". In the 1992 New Year Honours, he was appointed Companion of the Order of the Bath (CB). He was appointed Officer of the Venerable Order of Saint John (OStJ) on 2 February 2011.

He was appointed to the honorary position of colonel of the Gurkha Transport Regiment on 1 February 1984. He was succeeded by the then Brigadier Philip Trousdell on 27 October 1993. He was appointed colonel of The Royal Welch Fusiliers on 4 March 1990. His tenure expired on 4 March 1997.

Military offices
Preceded by Peter de la Billière	General Officer Commanding Wales; 1987–1990	Succeeded by Peter Davies
