= Lennox Napier =

British Army officer (1928–2020)

Major-General Lennox Napier CB OBE MC DL
- Born: 28 June 1928
- Died: 21 July 2020 (aged 92)
- Military career
- Allegiance: United Kingdom
- Branch: British Army
- Service years: 1946–1983
- Rank: Major-General
- Service number: 397999
- Commands: 1st Battalion South Wales Borderers; 1st Battalion Royal Regiment of Wales; Berlin Infantry Brigade; Wales
- Conflicts: Malayan Emergency
- Awards: Companion of the Order of the Bath; Officer of the Order of the British Empire; Military Cross

Major-General Lennox Alexander Hawkins Napier CB OBE MC DL (28 June 1928 – 21 July 2020) was a British Army officer.

== Military career ==
Educated at Radley College and the Royal Military Academy Sandhurst, Napier was commissioned into the South Wales Borderers in 1946. He saw action in Malaya and was recognised with the award of the Military Cross in December 1957 during the Malayan Emergency. He became commanding officer of the 1st Battalion South Wales Borderers in 1967 and commanding officer of the 1st Battalion Royal Regiment of Wales in 1969. He went on to be commander of the Berlin Infantry Brigade in 1974, Divisional Brigadier for the Prince of Wales' Division in 1976 and General Officer Commanding Wales in 1980 before retiring in 1983.

In 1959 he married Jennifer Dawn Wilson; they had one son and two daughters. In retirement he was chairman of the Central Rail Users' Consultative Committee.

He died on 21 July 2020 at the age of 92.

Military offices
| Preceded by Arthur Stewart-Cox | General Officer Commanding Wales; 1980–1983 | Succeeded by Peter Chiswell |
