= Headquarters Wales =

- Active: 1967–1991
- Country: United Kingdom
- Branch: British Army
- Type: District Command
- Garrison/HQ: The Barracks, Brecon

Headquarters Wales was a district command of the British Army from 1967 and 1991.

== History ==
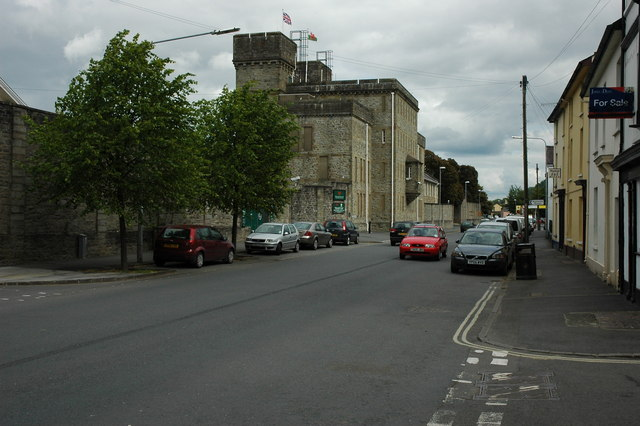
The Barracks, Brecon, command headquarters

The district was formed from 53rd (Welsh) Infantry Division as part of the Territorial Army Volunteer Reserve in 1967. It had its headquarters at The Barracks, Brecon, and was placed under the command of HQ UK Land Forces in 1972. In 1991, the first of the minor districts to be amalgamated were North West District, the former West Midlands District (by then Western District) and Wales, to form a new Wales and Western District. It was disbanded again on the formation of HQ Land Command in 1995.

== Commanders ==
General officers commanding included:
Headquarters Wales

- 1967–1968 Major-General Douglas Darling
- 1968–1970 Major-General Jeremy Spencer-Smith
- 1970–1973 Major-General John Woodrow
- 1973–1976 Major-General Peter Leuchars
- 1976–1978 Major-General John Graham
- 1978–1980 Major-General Arthur Stewart-Cox
- 1980–1983 Major-General Lennox Napier
- 1983–1985 Major-General Peter Chiswell
- 1985–1987 Major-General Peter de la Billière
- 1987–1990 Major-General Morgan Llewellyn
- 1990–1991 Major-General Peter Davies

Wales and Western District

- 1991–1994 Major-General Michael Regan
- 1994–1995 Major-General Ian Freer
