= 1970 Omani coup d'état =

1970 overthrow of the Sultan of Oman by his son

- Part of Dhofar rebellion
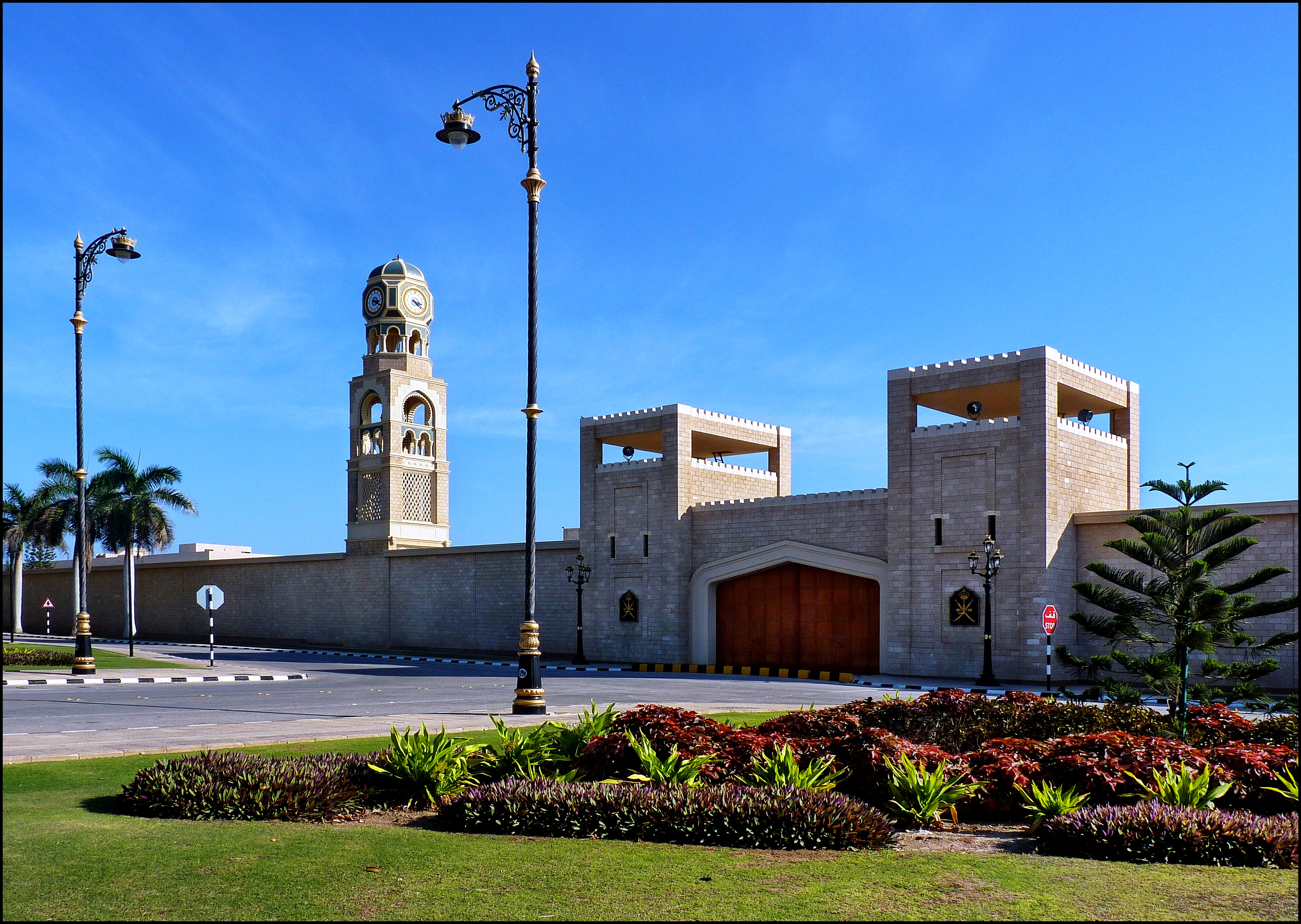
- The al-Husn palace where the coup took place
Date	23 July 1970
Location	Salalah, Oman 17°01′11″N 54°05′23″E
Result	Coup successful; Said bin Taimur overthrown; Sultanate of Oman established

Belligerents
(Oman) SAF officers; United Kingdom	Muscat and Oman

Commanders and leaders
(Oman) Qaboos bin Said; (United Kingdom) John Graham; (United Kingdom) Hugh Oldman	(Muscat and Oman) Said bin Taimur (WIA)

Casualties and losses
1 wounded	1 wounded
- Location within Oman

On 23 July 1970, Qaboos bin Said overthrew his father Said bin Taimur, the Sultan of Muscat and Oman. Occurring amid the Dhofar rebellion, the palace coup was executed by the British and saw Said deposed and sent into exile to the United Kingdom. Following the coup, Qaboos implemented a policy of modernization. At the time of his death in January 2020, he was the longest-serving ruler in the Middle East.

== Background ==
Beginning at the end of the 19th century, Oman gradually came under the influence of the British Empire through a series of treaties and diplomatic arrangements. Eventually, the Omani Sultan became increasingly reliant on Britain for support and advice. The Sultanate's primary sources of revenue, notably the slave trade and arms dealing, were prohibited by the British, resulting in confrontations between the Omani authorities and tribesmen in the country's interior. These confrontations led to Oman seeking military support from the British who agreed to defend Sultan Faisal bin Turki from attempts at overthrowing him.

In 1913, Sultan Taimur bin Feisal took the reins of Oman and brought back the kingdom to a more stable financial footing and quelled tribal unrest in the country. He ruled until his abdication in 1932 at which point his eldest son, Said bin Taimur, took over as Sultan. Under Said's rule, Oman became increasingly isolationist and underdeveloped. Internal unrest flourished such as in the case of the Jebel Akhdar and Dhofar wars. Said became increasingly reliant on the British to maintain control in his own country, which he refused to rule in a modern manner, at one point refusing to even leave his palace after an assassination attempt. The Dhofar War was a communist insurgency launched in 1963 and had gripped the country since then, pitting British-led Omani troops against the insurgents primarily in the southern part of the country. The Sultan's Armed Forces (SAF) were under de facto British command. British Colonel Hugh Oldman commanded the Sultan's troops in Muscat, while Brigadier John Graham was the overall commander of the SAF.

By 1970, all of the country's only major source of revenue, petrodollars, was either going to fighting insurgents or directly into the sultan's coffers. Said's poor leadership of the country and over-reliance on British military support aggravated the British government, who began to view his deposition as the only viable way to defeating Oman's growing communist insurgency. British officials contacted the Sultan's 29-year-old son, Qaboos bin Said, a graduate of the British Sandhurst military academy who was under house arrest per his father's orders. Cassette tapes with voice messages were sent to Qaboos, informing him of the plan the United Kingdom was concocting to topple his father. Qaboos agreed and the operation proceeded.

== Coup ==
On 23 July 1970, British-led military units were being put into position to topple the Sultan. Graham convened the top Arab commanders of the Desert Regiment, the main Omani unit that would carry out the coup, and informed them of the letter sent to them by Qaboos which "commanded" the British officers to carry out the coup. The meeting secured their loyalty and cooperation.

The troops arrived at the Al Hosn Palace in Salalah and were met with no resistance. The tribal sheikh of the five hundred guardsmen entrusted to defend the palace's exterior had been persuaded by the British to order his men to stand down prior to the coup. The remainder of the coup was carried out predominantly by Arab troops in order to mask the extent of the involvement of the British in the operation. During the coup, the Sultan shot Sheikh Braik Al Ghafri, a coup plotter and son of a prominent Omani governor in the stomach before accidentally shooting himself in the foot as he cocked his pistol. Said managed to briefly escape with a few confidantes and bodyguards down a series of hidden passageways and tunnels but was recaptured quickly. The wounded sultan urged his adviser to send an urgent message to Oldman informing him of the events that had transpired, which Oldman being a coup planner ignored. The coup ended when Said signed a document of abdication, handing over the reins of the country to his son, Qaboos. Said was flown out of the country on an RAF Bristol Britannia, first to Bahrain for medical treatment and then on to London where he lived the remaining two years of his life in a suite in The Dorchester, a luxury hotel.

== Aftermath ==
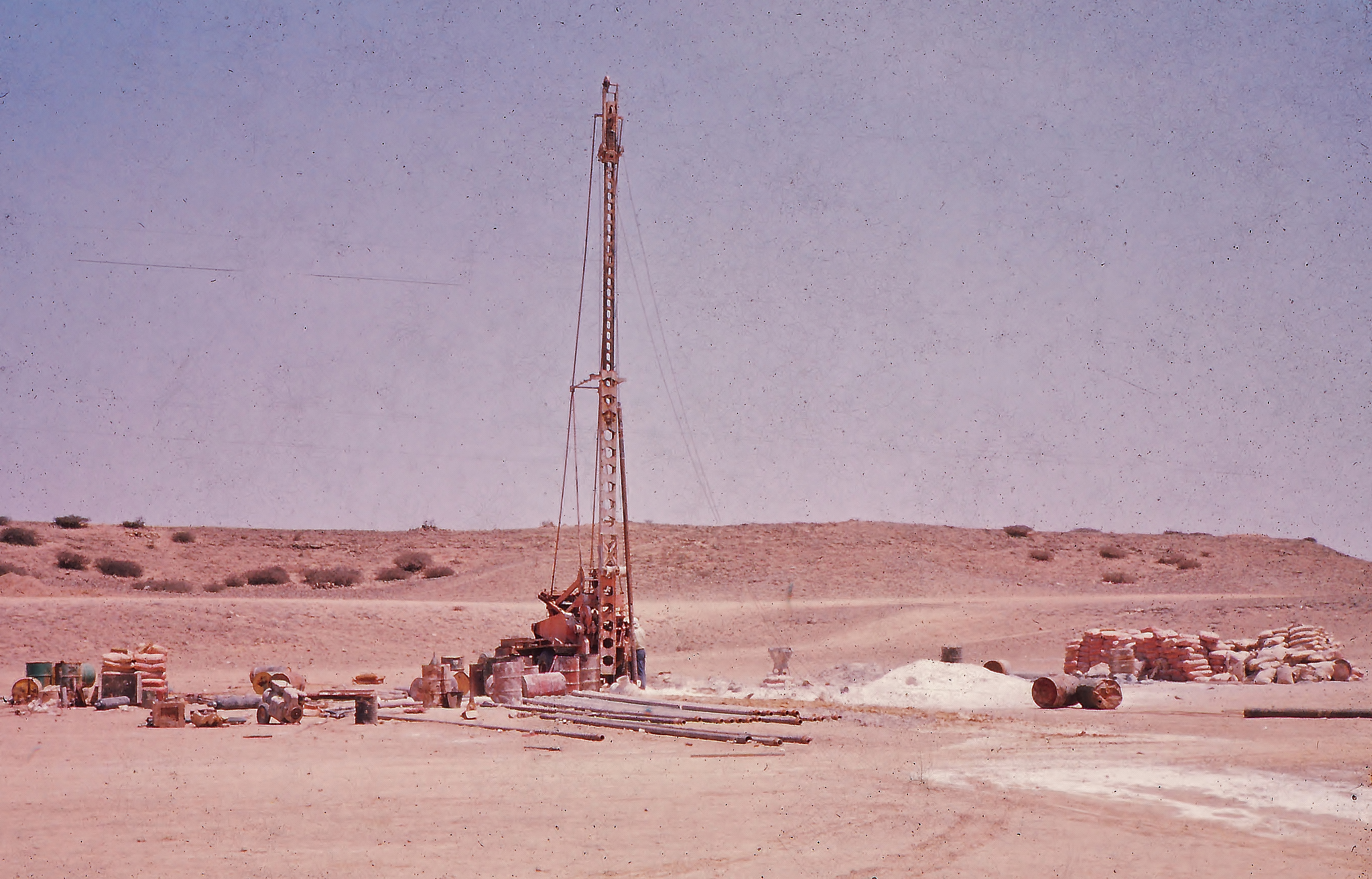
An oil rig in Oman, photographed in 1971

Qaboos, now the new Sultan, immediately set on his priorities of modernizing the country and defeating the insurgency in the newly renamed Sultanate of Oman's interior. Prior to taking the throne, Oman had no secondary schools, only one hospital, and a total of ten kilometres (6.2 mi) of paved roads. He redirected the country's oil revenue to economic initiatives, moving the country away from subsistence farming and fishing, and building modern infrastructure. Schools were built, the country was electrified, numerous roads were paved, and Western media ceased labelling the country as "medieval". Slavery in Oman was abolished, and by 1980, Oman had 28 hospitals, 363 schools, and 12,000 kilometres (7,500 mi) of paved roads. In addition, the Majlis Al-Shura was established with the power to review legislation and call government ministers to meet with them.

The success of the Dhofar War which was proving to be a formidable challenge for the state was reversed with the removal of Taimur. Qaboos launched a concerted £400 million effort to modernize the Omani military, even founding a navy to protect the country's oil exports. The communist rebels gradually lost their foreign support from the Soviet Union and China after a string of military defeats. This, coupled with mounting international opposition to the rebellion including the deployment of Iranian troops in 1973 led to a final defeat of the rebels in 1976. Internal unrest in Oman successfully ended owing to an initiative by Qaboos to include all ethnic and tribal groups into the administration of the country and granting amnesty for former rebels.

The involvement of the British government as a whole in the coup was denied for forty years with the official government narrative being the coup was carried out predominantly by Arab troops with their British commanders taking part on personal initiative. In truth, the coup had been planned by MI6, the Foreign Office, and the Ministry of Defence and given the go-ahead by prime minister Edward Heath. Contingency planning of the event showed that Qaboos would have been kept under the protection of British troops then flown out of the country should the coup have failed.
