= Peter Chiswell (British Army officer) =

British Army general (1930–2025)

Major-General Peter Chiswell CB CBE DL
- Born: 19 April 1930
- Died: 24 June 2025 (aged 95)
- Military career
- Allegiance: United Kingdom
- Branch: British Army
- Rank: Major-General
- Commands: 3rd Battalion Parachute Regiment; 44th Parachute Brigade; Wales
- Conflicts: Northern Ireland
- Awards: Companion of the Order of the Bath; Commander of the Order of the British Empire

Major-General Peter Irvine Chiswell CB CBE DL (19 April 1930 – 24 June 2025) was a British Army officer.

== Biography ==
Educated at Allhallows School and the Royal Military Academy Sandhurst, Chiswell was commissioned into the Devonshire Regiment in 1951. He became commanding officer of 3rd Battalion Parachute Regiment in 1969. He went on to be Deputy Chief of Staff for the United Nations Peacekeeping Force in Cyprus in 1974, commander of 44th Parachute Brigade in 1976 and Assistant Chief of Staff (Operations) for Northern Army Group in 1978. After that he became commander of Land Forces in Northern Ireland in 1982 and General Officer Commanding Wales in 1983 before retiring in 1985.

In 1958, he married Felicity Philippa Martin; they have two sons.

Chiswell died on 24 June 2025, at the age of 95.

Military offices
Preceded by Lennox Napier	General Officer Commanding Wales; 1983–1985	Succeeded by Peter de la Billière
