= Arthur Stewart-Cox =

British general (1925–2003)

Major-General Arthur Stewart-Cox DFC
- Born: 11 April 1925
- Died: 11 November 2003 (aged 78)
- Military career
- Allegiance: United Kingdom
- Branch: British Army
- Service years: 1944–1980
- Rank: Major-General
- Service number: 335387
- Unit: Royal Artillery
- Commands: 29th Commando Regiment Royal Artillery; Wales
- Conflicts: Second World War; Korean War
- Awards: Distinguished Flying Cross

Major-General Arthur George Ernest Stewart-Cox DFC (11 April 1925 – 11 November 2003) was a British Army officer.

== Military career ==
Stewart-Cox was the son of Lieutenant-Colonel Arthur Stewart Cox (1888-1973) and Dorothea Stirling Sinclair May, daughter of Major-General Sir Edward Sinclair May (1856-1936). He was commissioned into the Royal Artillery on 25 November 1944 during the Second World War. He saw action as an artillery air-observation pilot and was recognised by the award of the Distinguished Flying Cross during the Korean War. He served as commanding officer of 29th Commando Regiment Royal Artillery in the late 1960s. He went on to be Commander, Royal Artillery for 4th Division in 1970, Deputy Director of Army Manning at the Ministry of Defence in 1974 and General Officer Commanding Wales in 1978 before retiring in 1980.

In 1953 he married Mary Pamela Lyttelton, daughter of the Hon. George Lyttelton; they had one daughter and three sons.

Military offices
| Preceded by John Graham | GOC Wales; 1978–1980 | Succeeded by Lennox Napier |
