= Peter de la Billière =

British Army officer (born 1934)

General Sir Peter de la Billière KCB KBE DSO MC & Bar DL
- Born: 29 April 1934 (age 92); Plymouth, Devon, England
- Military career
- Allegiance: United Kingdom
- Branch: British Army
- Service years: 1952–1992
- Rank: General
- Service number: 424859
- Commands: British Forces Middle East (1990–1991); South East District (1988–90); Headquarters Wales (1985–1987); Director Special Forces (1979–1983); 22 SAS Regiment (1972–1974)
- Conflicts: Korean War; Malayan Emergency; Jebel Akhdar War; Indonesia–Malaysia confrontation Dhofar Rebellion; Falklands War; Gulf War
- Awards: Knight Commander of the Order of the Bath; Knight Commander of the Order of the British Empire; Companion of the Distinguished Service Order; Military Cross & bar Mentioned in despatches Meritorious Service Cross (Canada); Order of King Abdulaziz, 2nd Class (Saudi Arabia); Chief Commander of the Legion of Merit (United States)

General Sir Peter Edgar de la Cour de la Billière, KCB, KBE, DSO, MC & Bar, DL (born 29 April 1934) is a former British Army officer who was Director SAS during the Iranian Embassy siege, and Commander-in-Chief of the British forces in Operation Granby during the Gulf War.

== Early years ==
Peter de la Billière was born in Plymouth, Devon, the son of Surgeon Lieutenant Commander Claude Denis Delacour de la Billière and his wife, Frances Christine Wright ("Kitty") Lawley. On 22 May 1941 his father, who had been educated at Monkton Combe School near Bath, Somerset, was killed when his ship, HMS Fiji, was sunk by German bombers in an attack south-west of Crete.

De la Billière was educated at St Peter's Court School, in Broadstairs, Kent, and Harrow School. A "Peter de la Billière" is mentioned as pupil evacuee of St Peter's Court sent to Crediton, Devon in Our Land at War by Duff Hart-Davis.

== Military career ==
De la Billière originally enlisted as a private in the King's Shropshire Light Infantry in 1952. He was later commissioned as a second lieutenant into the Durham Light Infantry. During his early career as an officer he served in Japan, Korea and Egypt with the regiment's 1st Battalion.

=== Special Air Service Regiment ===
In 1956, de la Billière attended and passed Selection for the Special Air Service. During his first SAS tour, he served in Malaya during the Malayan Emergency, as well as Oman where he was mentioned in despatches and was awarded the Military Cross in 1959 for leading a troop in the assault on Jebel Akdar. After his initial tour with 22 SAS, he returned to the Durham Light Infantry to run recruit training, before taking up the post of Adjutant of 21 SAS – the London-based Territorial Army (reserve) SAS regiment.

In 1962, he was attached to the Federal Army in Aden. In 1964, he failed Staff College but was appointed Officer Commanding A Squadron 22 SAS. From 1964 to 1966, A Squadron 22 SAS was deployed to Borneo for the Indonesia-Malaysia confrontation. For his actions during this period he was awarded a bar to his Military Cross.

After this tour, de la Billière re-attended Staff College, and, this time, passed. After Staff College he was posted as G2 (intelligence) Special Forces at Army Strategic Command. He then served a tour as second-in-command of 22 SAS, of which he was Commanding Officer from 1972 to 1974. For service in Oman, he was appointed a Companion of the Distinguished Service Order (DSO) in 1976 for his actions in the battles at Musandam and Dhofar.

De la Billière then served from 1977 in a number of administrative posts assuming command of the British Army Training Team in Sudan before returning to the regiment as Director SAS in 1979. For the next four years he commanded SAS Group with overall responsibility for military command. It was during this period that the Special Air Service Regiment became publicly known as a consequence of their storming of the Iranian Embassy in 1980. He was also responsible during the Falklands War for planning Operation Mikado. In 1982, he was appointed a Commander of the Order of the British Empire (CBE).

=== Regular service commands ===
After the SAS, de la Billière was appointed Military Commissioner and Commander of British Forces in the Falkland Islands from 1984 and General Officer Commanding Wales District from 1985. He was succeeded by Brigadier Morgan Llewellyn on 1 December 1987. In 1987 he was appointed Knight Commander of the Order of the Bath (KCB). He was General Officer Commanding South East District from 1988.

Despite being due for retirement, de la Billière was appointed on 6 October 1990 as the Commander-in-Chief of British Forces in Operation Granby (the Gulf War), in effect the second-in-command of the multinational military coalition headed by US General Norman Schwarzkopf Jr. His experience of fighting in the area, knowledge of the people and possession of some fluency in Arabic overrode concerns about his age. In this role he was largely responsible for persuading Schwarzkopf, who was initially sceptical, to allow the use of SAS and other special forces in significant roles in the conflict.

The British army contingent expanded from 14,000 early in November 1990 to more than 45,000 through to completion of the engagement and cessation of hostilities in February 1991. In 1991, he was appointed Knight Commander of the Order of the British Empire (KBE). In August 1991, de la Billière received Canada's Meritorious Service Cross.

By the end of his career, de la Billière had risen to the rank of general, and became a special adviser to the Secretary of State for Defence on Middle East military matters. To enable him to receive the pension benefits of full general, he was given the newly created sinecurist (honorarium) post, of Middle East Advisor to the Secretary of State for Defence. He retired in June 1992.

== Later life ==
In 1993, he received Saudi Arabia's Order of King Abdulaziz, 2nd Class, and was made a Chief Commander of the United States' Legion of Merit.

De la Billière has written or co-authored 18 books, including an autobiography, a personal account of the Gulf War and a number of works about the SAS.

== Personal life ==
In 1965, he married Bridget Constance Muriel Goode. They have one son and two daughters.

Military offices
Preceded by John Watts	Director SAS; 1979–1983	Succeeded by John Foley
Preceded by Peter Chiswell	General Officer Commanding Wales; 1985–1987	Succeeded by Morgan Llewellyn
Preceded by Sir Michael Gray	GOC South East District; 1988–1990	Succeeded by Sir Richard Swinburn
Preceded by Andrew Wilson	Commander British Forces Middle East; In-theatre commander for Operation Granby; October 1990 – March 1991	Succeeded by Ian Macfadyen
