= Operation Mikado =

Cancelled UK operation of the Falklands War

- Part of Falklands War
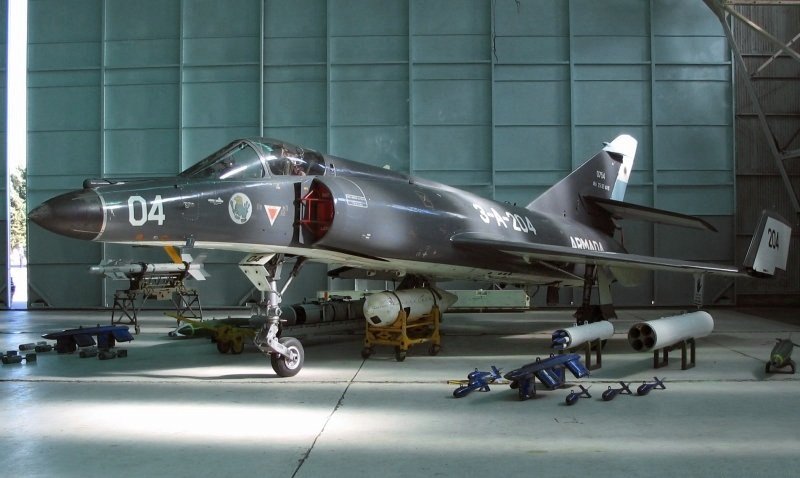
- An Argentine Navy Dassault-Breguet Super Étendard
- Type: Airborne operation
- Location: Rio Grande, Tierra del Fuego, Argentina
- Planned: May 1982
- Planned by: Brigadier Peter de la Billière
- Target: Super Étendard squadron of the Argentine Navy
- Executed by: Special Air Service
- Outcome: Operation cancelled

Operation Mikado was the code name of an unrealised military plan by the United Kingdom to use Special Air Service troops to attack the home base of Argentina's five Super Etendard strike fighters at Río Grande, Tierra del Fuego, during the 1982 Falklands War. Brigadier Peter de la Billière was in charge of planning the operation.

The British Task Force had been successfully attacked by these Argentinean aircraft using French Exocet air-to-sea missiles, sinking two ships. This operation was intended to destroy the three remaining Exocet missiles that Argentina had in its possession and the Super Étendard launch aircraft. It was also intended to kill the pilots in their quarters. To achieve this, Brigadier Peter de la Billière (Director of the SAS) proposed an operation similar to Operation Entebbe, which consisted of landing 55 SAS soldiers in two Lockheed C-130 Hercules aircraft directly on the runway at Rio Grande.

According to the plan, the C-130s would be kept on the tarmac with engines running while the men of B Squadron SAS performed their mission. If the C-130s survived, then they would head for the Chilean air base at Punta Arenas. If not, the surviving members of the SAS Squadron and aircrew would use whatever transport available on the airfield to make their way to the Chilean border, about 80 kilometres (50 mi) to their west.

== Planned operation ==
=== Argentine defences ===
The Argentine Navy had begun deploying parts of its 1st Marine Infantry Brigade to the area in late April, anticipating the possibility of a helicopter raid. By mid-May, the following units were in the immediate vicinity of the Rio Grande Air Base:

- 1st Marine Infantry Battalion - supported by the Regiment's Reconnaissance company, which was equipped with 12 Panhard AML-90s as well as a section-sized element of the Anti-Tank company, carrying "Mamba" missiles (Cobra variant)
- 2nd Marine Infantry Battalion - supported by the rest of the Anti-Tank company, equipped with 105mm recoilless guns
- Brigade HQ, Communications and Logistic Battalions

The base itself was defended by:

- One TPS-43 radar
- 2nd Anti-Air Battery of the Air Force's V Air Brigade, equipped with 9 Rh-202 20mm autocannons
- One Navy Anti-Air detachment, with an unspecified number of 40mm Bofors guns
- One Army Anti-Air detachment, with an unspecified number of 30mm Oerlikon guns
- One Air Base Security company
- One Army Engineer company

By late May, the base was severely overcrowded, hosting more than 1200 men of all three branches, thrice its maximum capacity.

=== Preliminary reconnaissance ===
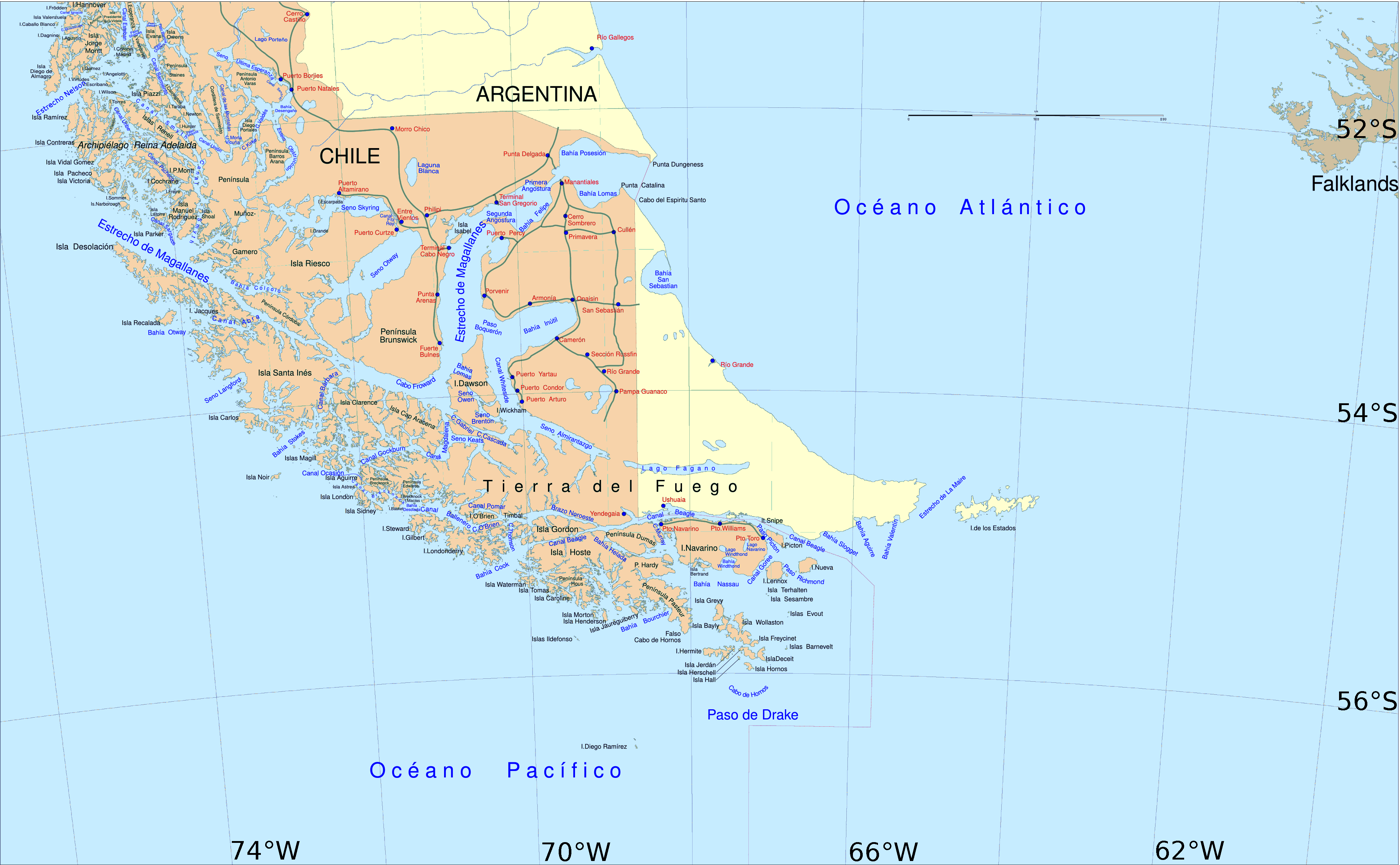
Tierra del Fuego and the West Falkland Islands

A preliminary reconnaissance mission on Río Grande, code-named Operation Plum Duff, was launched from HMS Invincible on the night of 17/18 May, as a prelude to the attack. The operation consisted of transporting a small SAS team to the Argentine side of Tierra del Fuego on a stripped down Royal Navy Westland Sea King HC.4. The original plan was for the SAS team to march to the Rio Grande air base from the drop-off point and to set up an observation post to collect intelligence on the base's defences.

The mission required that the Sea King helicopter travel a distance close to its maximum operating range, making this a one-way mission. Therefore, the aircrew mission consisted of dropping the SAS team in Argentina, heading to Chile and disposing of the aircraft by sinking it in deep water.

The aircraft, with a three-man crew and an eight-man SAS team, took off from Invincible at 0015 hrs on 18 May. The aircraft inadvertently passed close to an Argentinian drilling rig in an offshore gas field forcing it to detour, adding twenty minutes to the transit. As it approached the Argentinian coast after four hours, fog reduced visibility to less than a mile. As they approached twelve miles from the planned SAS drop-off point, visibility was reduced to such an extent that the pilot was forced to land. The pilot and the commander of the SAS patrol disagreed on their exact position. The SAS commander was also certain that they had been spotted by an Argentine patrol: he asked to be dropped on the Chile/Argentine border.

The pilots were forced to fly on instruments through Instrument Meteorological Conditions into neutral Chile. The SAS team was dropped off on the south coast of Bahia Inútil where they were to attempt to move to their observation post on foot. The helicopter crew flew to a beach closer to Punta Arenas, where they landed. One of the two pilots and the aircrewman disembarked on the beach and cut holes in the helicopter to allow it to sink once it was ditched. The other pilot then flew it out over the water but was unable to sink it.

He flew back to the beach to cut more holes, but was blinded in his night vision goggles by a blinking "Low Fuel" light and crashed on the beach. The crew set fire to the helicopter and detonated explosive charges before leaving the scene. They moved over several nights to an observation point near Punta Arenas, where they attempted to make contact with the British Embassy. They were discovered and picked up by the Chilean military while moving through town and were turned over to British officials.

According to Argentine reports, the helicopter was tracked by the radar of the destroyer ARA Bouchard on the night of 17/18 May. Bouchard sent a message to her sister ship ARA Piedrabuena patrolling on the north, and to the air base of Río Grande. In 2007, members of the Argentine 24th Infantry Regiment claimed that they had hit the helicopter with small arms fire amid thick fog south of Rio Gallegos. The SAS reconnaissance mission was eventually aborted.

=== Abandonment of mission ===
By this time, Operation Mikado, which was already seen by experienced SAS members to be a suicide mission, was considered to be impossible to pull off, due to the loss of the element of surprise and due to British intelligence discovering that the Argentines enjoyed far better radar coverage than initially expected. As a consequence, the airborne assault plan attracted considerable hostility from some members of the SAS, which ultimately led to one sergeant submitting his resignation shortly before the team was due to fly out to Ascension and to the squadron's commander being relieved and replaced by the regiment's second-in-command.

The lack of on-site intelligence meant that the British forces did not have a clear idea of how Rio Grande was defended, nor any guarantees that the Super Etendards or the Exocets would even be there if an operation took place. British forces also had no information on how the base was organized and did not know where the Exocets or pilots were located.

=== Rumoured secondary plan ===
Contrary to rumours, no plan was devised to infiltrate the SAS into Argentina by Royal Navy submarine HMS Onyx. The Argentine Navy claims that the Bouchard had shelled a submarine and a number of inflatable boats while on patrol two miles off Rio Grande, at the position 53°43′38.04″S 67°42′0″W on the evening of 16 May 1982.

== Assessment ==
Ultimately, the British Government acknowledged that there was a strong likelihood that the operation would have failed. After the war, it was revealed that the Rio Grande area was defended by four Argentine Navy Marine Corps battalions, some of whose officers had been trained in the UK by the SBS years earlier.

After the war, Argentine marine commanders stated that they were expecting a special forces attack, but never expected a Hercules to land directly on their runways, although they would have pursued British forces even into Chilean territory in case of attack. The operation's failure would have been a propaganda disaster for the British forces, and conversely a morale boost for Argentina.
