= Welbeck Defence Sixth Form College =

Former British sixth-form college specialising in military technical studies

Welbeck College

Location
- Woodhouse, Leicestershire, LE12 8WD; England
- Coordinates: 52°43′58″N 1°12′35″W

Information
- Former names: Welbeck College (1953–2005)
- Type: Private, boarding, sixth form college
- Established: 25 September 1953; 72 years ago
- Closed: 3 July 2021; 4 years ago
- Local authority: Leicestershire County Council
- Department for Education URN: 130784 Tables
- Chair of Governors: Andrew Roe
- Principal: Howard Blackett
- Gender: mixed
- Age range: 16 to 19
- Enrolment: 309 (2018)
- Campus size: 70 acres (28 hectares)
- Houses: Alanbrooke; Nelson; Portland; Stirling; Trenchard
- Publication: The Welbexian
- School fees: £6,900 per term (2019/2020)
- Affiliation: Headmasters' and Headmistresses' Conference (Associate)
- Alumni: Old Welbexians
- Website: www.dsfc.ac.uk

Welbeck Defence Sixth Form College (stylised as Welbeck – The Defence Sixth Form College), formerly named and often referred to as simply Welbeck College, was an independent, selective sixth form college in Leicestershire, England. While run as a sixth form college, the school was an institution of the Ministry of Defence (MoD), and part of the Defence Academy of the United Kingdom.

Founded in 1953, the school was originally based at Welbeck Abbey near Worksop, where it provided A-level education for boys planning to join the technical branches of the British Army. By 1992, the school accepted both male and female students for all three branches of the British Armed Forces, and in 2005, the school was re-opened and relocated to a purpose-built site in Leicestershire, where it also began admitting potential civil servants for the Defence Engineering and Science Group within the Ministry of Defence. The school closed on 3 July 2021.

== History ==
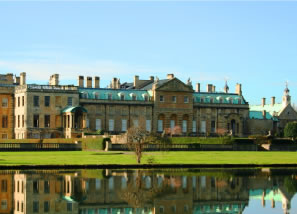
The precursor school was housed at Welbeck Abbey from its foundation in 1953 until 2005.

=== Foundation ===
Recognising a decline in the number of cadets passing to Royal Military Academy Sandhurst (RMAS), particularly from the north of England, in 1951, the Army Council appointed a committee to consider ways to attract young boys to take commissions in the army. The committee concluded that either a system of scholarships should be established to encourage boys to stay at school until they were 18 before graduating to Sandhurst, or that the army should open a school of its own. The second method was preferred by the council, who appointed a second committee which selected Welbeck Abbey; previously an army college for adults, as the site for the new school. The report was approved by the council, and in the autumn of 1952, work commenced to convert the abbey, which was let by the Duke of Portland to the Ministry of Defence, into a teaching facility.

Following several meetings throughout September 1953 to finalise some last details, Welbeck College, The Army Sixth Form, was officially opened on 25 September 1953; 72 years ago.

=== Expansion and re-opening ===
In 1992, female students were permitted to join the school for the first time.

In 2002, the Defence Training Review resulted in a decision to expand the school to accommodate candidates for the engineering branches of the Royal Navy (RN) and the Royal Air Force (RAF), starting from 2004. Having operated from Welbeck Abbey for half a century, the review also resulted in the decision to close the school at the abbey, and open a new Defence Sixth Form College on the site of some disused barracks outside Woodhouse, near Loughborough.

The purpose-built site was selected for its proximity to the M1 motorway and the East Midlands Airport, and reportedly cost £38 million to develop. The school officially re-opened as Welbeck – The Defence Sixth Form College, on 7 December 2005. Upon its re-opening, the school continued to admit potential officers for all three branches of the armed forces as it had started doing the year prior, and began admitting potential civil servants for the Defence Engineering and Science Group (DESG) within the Ministry of Defence.

=== Closure and current use ===
On 11 March 2019, it was announced in the House of Commons that the school would be closed in 2021. A spokesperson for the Ministry of Defence acknowledged that the school had "produced some excellent young graduates", but said that the school was "not meeting Defence's requirements or providing sufficient value for money".

In a parliamentary debate called by then-Conservative MP Nicky Morgan on 30 April 2019, Defence minister Mark Lancaster said that "the scheme as it stands has consistently failed to deliver the required number of engineers and technical officers to Defence since its establishment in 2005", and that, "on average only 53 per cent of entrants have completed [the scheme] successfully, and a proportion of those have not achieved STEM degrees". He also noted that "the scheme has cost the Ministry of Defence and the taxpayer some £200,000 per student who has become a STEM graduate".

The school was officially closed at the final graduation ceremony on 3 July 2021, which was attended by Princess Anne.

The site has been retained by the Ministry of Defence, and in September 2021, converted to a military establishment, renamed as MOD Garats Hay. In January 2023, a regional medical centre was opened on the site, for use by serving personnel. The site is currently being used by the military for military training and conference purposes, along with sports events and general classroom learning. Civilian emergency services, including the police also make use of the site, including 'blue light' training, pyrotechnics and simulated gunfire, and canine training.

== Governance ==
Although run as a sixth form college, the school was an institution of the Ministry of Defence and ultimately part of the Defence Academy of the United Kingdom, and latterly operated by Minerva Ltd as part of a public–private partnership.

It was governed by a board, including senior armed forces personnel, civil servants, individuals with technical and industrial experience, directors of Minerva, as well as staff and parents. The board acted as an advisory, rather than a proprietorial body, overseeing the day-to-day running of the school, the facilities, and the provision of education and pastoral care. There were two sub-committees: academic and pastoral, and facilities; which reported to the main governing board.

The school was an associate of the Headmasters' and Headmistresses' Conference (HMC).

== Admissions ==
As a selective school, it required prospective pupils to satisfy one of the Single Service Selection Boards, and meet minimum academic requirements. Candidates had to be British citizens, or hold dual-nationality, with one being British. Candidates were required to have an A grade in GCSE mathematics (or equivalent), a B grade in the equivalent level science, and a C grade in the equivalent level English language. A 2018 Independent Schools Inspectorate report noted that pupils at the school came from a very diverse range of backgrounds from across the United Kingdom. A similar report in 2014 noted that just under a quarter of the students were girls.

A small number of private pupils were admitted annually, who paid £6,900 per term during 2019/2020, although the majority of students were classified as 'sponsored students', and had their tuition fees paid for by the Ministry of Defence (MoD). All students' parents were expected to contribute toward maintenance costs, including board, lodging, uniform, and any other services provided, though the amount varied based on gross annual household income and several other factors.

== Curriculum ==
=== Structure ===
Aiming to prepare students for careers in the British Armed Forces, the school focused primarily on science, technology, engineering, and mathematics (STEM) subjects, and, shortly before its closure, offered a choice of eleven core subjects. Before its closure, all students were required to take four AS-levels in lower-sixth, including mathematics and physics, and all had to continue mathematics at A-level in their final year. An enrichment programme was also available, whereby students could attain additional qualifications such as developing language skills or completing an Extended Project Qualification (EPQ).

A 2018 Independent Schools Inspectorate (ISI) report noted that A-level results from 2014 to 2016 were above the national average for sixth formers in maintained schools, similar to the 2014 ISI report which further found that over two-thirds of results were graded A* to B in 2013. Pupils of the school were given preferred entry to the Defence Technical Undergraduate Scheme (DTUS), which aimed to further prepare students for careers in the armed forces. Pupils typically went on to read science, engineering, or management degrees at one of eleven universities on the scheme.

=== Combined Cadet Force ===
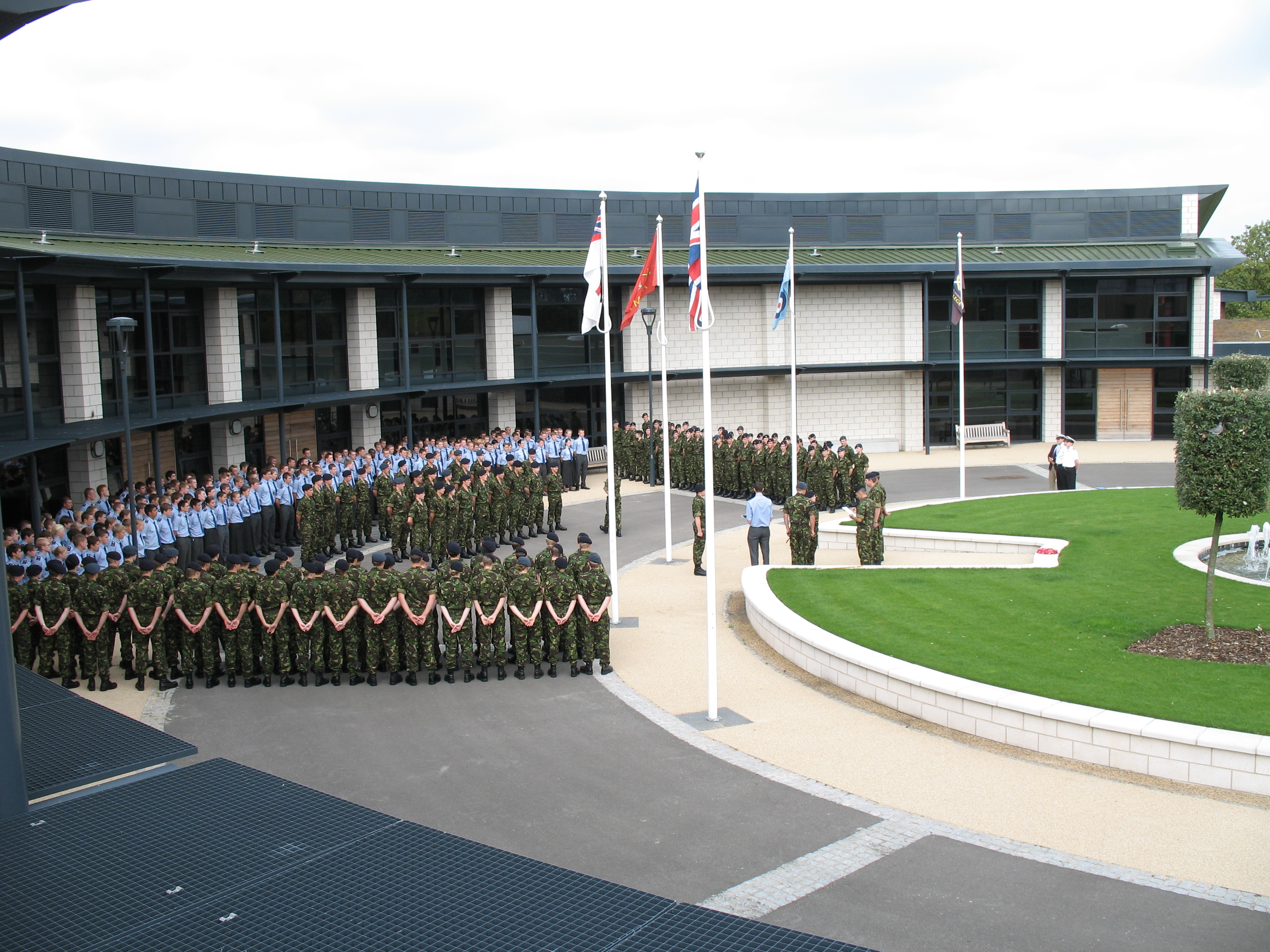
The school CCF on parade outside the main building.

Unlike most schools, participation in the school's Combined Cadet Force (CCF) was a compulsory part of the curriculum for all students. The school CCF did not follow the usual cadet training programme, instead holding sessions twice per week, and placing more emphasis on skills and leadership, in order to better prepare students for officer training.

The school CCF held an annual passing out parade to an audience of family, friends, and invited guests. Awards were given to the best cadet from each section, and two special awards: the Welbeck Sword of Honour and the Prince Philip Medal, were also presented.

== Extracurricular activities ==
A wide range of sports were offered at the school, and students participated in regional and military sporting events. In addition to compulsory sports and CCF activities, students were required to participate in at least one further activity per week, from a range of sporting and non-sporting options. These activities included local volunteering, as well as participation in The Duke of Edinburgh's Award (DofE Award) programme.

== School site ==
The school had a purpose-built site outside Woodhouse, near Loughborough in Leicestershire, from its re-opening in 2005 until its closure in 2021. Built on the site of some disused army barracks, the site was close to both the M1 motorway and the East Midlands Airport, and reportedly developed at a cost of £38 million. The school buildings were grouped into four distinct zones adjacent to a large area of sports fields, and included dining facilities, a medical wing, student club areas, a learning resource centre, and computer laboratories. Five boarding houses accommodated up to 380 students, while residential house staff were provided with separate accommodation.

== Notable alumni ==
Welbeck College educated the following notable alumni in the British Armed Forces:

- Brigadier Andrew Massey, Army officer
- Lieutenant General Richard Cripwell, Army officer
- Lieutenant General Sir David Bill, Army officer
- Lieutenant General Andrew Figgures, former Master-General of the Ordnance
- Lieutenant General Tyrone Urch, Army officer
- Major General Peter Ronald Davies, Army officer and animal welfare campaigner
- Lieutenant Colonel Dick Strawbridge, Army officer, engineer, television presenter, and environmentalist
- Pam Relph, Paralympic Gold medallist

== See also ==
- Template: Ranks and Insignia of UK/CDT/WelbeckDSFC
