= Peter Davies (British Army officer) =

British Army general (born 1938)

Major-General Peter Davies CB
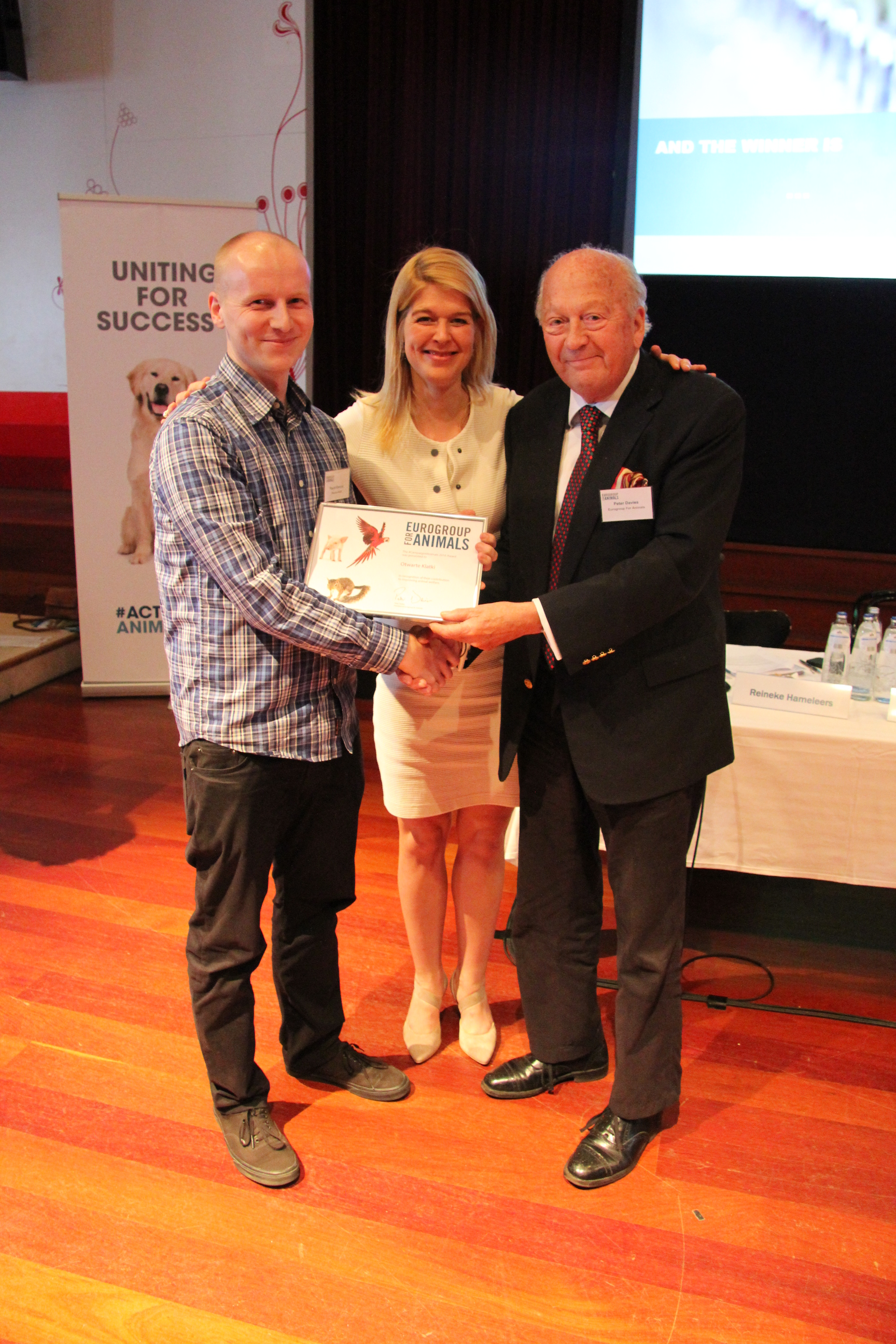
- Peter Davies, as president of Eurogroup for Animals, presenting the Campaign4Animals Award to Otwarte Klatki (Open Cages) on 22 June 2016
- Born: 10 May 1938 (age 88)
- Military career
- Allegiance: United Kingdom
- Branch: British Army
- Rank: Major-General
- Commands: 1st Armoured Division's Signals Regiment; 12th Armoured Brigade; Wales
- Awards: Companion of the Order of the Bath

Major-General Peter Ronald Davies CB (born 10 May 1938) is a retired British Army officer and animal welfare campaigner.

== Early life and education ==
Davies was educated at Llandovery College, Welbeck College and at Royal Military Academy Sandhurst.

== Military career ==
Davies was commissioned into the Royal Corps of Signals in 1958. He became the commanding officer of the 1st Armoured Division's Signals Regiment in 1976. He went on to be commander of 12th Armoured Brigade in 1982, director of studies of the Staff College, Camberley, in 1986 and commander communications, British Army of the Rhine in 1988. His last appointment was as general officer commanding Wales in 1990 before retiring in 1991.

Davies was appointed Colonel of The King's Regiment in 1986 and served in that position until 1994. He was also the colonel commandant of the Royal Signals from 1990 to 1996. He was appointed Companion of the Order of the Bath (CB) in the 1992 New Year Honours. He is also the president of the Jullundur Brigade Association.

== Animal welfare ==
In 1991, Maj-Gen Davies was appointed the Director General of the Royal Society for the Prevention of Cruelty to Animals (RSPCA) where he served for 11 years. During 2002, Davies assumed the role of Director General of The World Society for the Protection of Animals (WSPA) – now known as World Animal Protection – until 2009. Also, Davies has served as the Chairman of Trustees for The Brooke Hospital for Animals, President of Eurogroup for Animal Welfare, Chairman of Animals in War Memorial Fund and as Chairman of Freedom Food Ltd (an initiative to assure high quality animal husbandry in food production) now known as RSPCA Assured.

Military offices
Preceded by Morgan Llewellyn	General Officer Commanding Wales; 1990–1991	Succeeded by Michael Regan
