= Peter Leuchars =

British Army general (1921–2009)

Major-General Peter Leuchars CBE
- Born: 29 October 1921; London, England
- Died: 17 July 2009 (aged 87)
- Military career
- Allegiance: United Kingdom
- Branch: British Army
- Service years: 1941–1976
- Rank: Major-General
- Service number: 200120
- Unit: Welsh Guards
- Commands: 1st Battalion, Welsh Guards; 11th Armoured Brigade; Wales
- Conflicts: Second World War; Palestine Emergency; Indonesia–Malaysia confrontation
- Awards: Bailiff Grand Cross of the Venerable Order of St John; Commander of the Order of the British Empire; Mentioned in dispatches (2)

Major-General Peter Raymond Leuchars, CBE (29 October 1921 – 17 July 2009) was a British Army officer who saw service in north west Europe during the Second World War.

== Military career ==
Educated at Bradfield College and the Royal Military College, Sandhurst, Leuchars was commissioned into the Welsh Guards in 1941. He saw action at the Normandy landings in June 1944 and then in north west Europe during the Second World War. He became commanding officer of the 1st Battalion the Welsh Guards in 1963. He went on to be Chief of Staff to the Director of Operations in Borneo during the Indonesia–Malaysia confrontation. After that he became commander 11th Armoured Brigade in British Army of the Rhine in 1966, Deputy Commandant of the Staff College, Camberley in 1972 and General Officer Commanding Wales in 1973 before retiring in 1976.

He was a Bailiff Grand Cross of the Venerable Order of St John and a Commander of the Order of the British Empire. He was twice mentioned in dispatches. He died on 17 July 2009.

He married Gillian Nivison, daughter of John Nivison, 2nd Baron Glendyne, in 1953; they had one son.

Military offices
Preceded by John Woodrow	GOC Wales; 1973–1976	Succeeded by John Graham
