= Douglas Darling =

British Army general (1914–1978)

Major-General Douglas Darling CB DSO* MC*
- Born: 3 October 1914; Bengal Presidency, British India
- Died: 28 December 1978 (aged 64); Bristol, Gloucestershire, England
- Burial place: Hullavington, Wiltshire, England
- Relatives: General Sir Kenneth Darling (brother)
- Military career
- Allegiance: United Kingdom
- Branch: British Army
- Service years: 1934–1968
- Rank: Major-General
- Service number: 63638
- Unit: Rifle Brigade (The Prince Consort's Own)
- Commands: 7th Battalion, Rifle Brigade (The Prince Consort's Own); 133rd Infantry Brigade; 53rd (Welsh) Division/District; Wales
- Conflicts: Second World War
- Awards: Companion of the Order of the Bath; Distinguished Service Order & Bar; Military Cross & Bar

Major-General Douglas Lyall Darling CB, DSO & Bar, MC & Bar (3 October 1914 – 28 December 1978) was a British Army officer who was highly decorated for gallantry and leadership during the Second World War.

== Early life ==
Darling was born in India, the younger son of George Kenneth Darling (1879–1964) of the Indian Civil Service and his wife Mabel Eleanor, née Burgess (d. 1952). His elder brother was General Sir Kenneth Darling. He was educated at Eton College and at the Royal Military College, Sandhurst.

== Military career ==
After graduating from the Royal Military College, Sandhurst, he was commissioned into the Rifle Brigade (The Prince Consort's Own) on 30 August 1934.

Seeing action in the Second World War, he was awarded the Military Cross on 8 July 1941. Between January and May 1942 he attended the 6th War Course at the Middle East Staff School in Haifa. Darling then took command of the 7th Battalion of the Rifle Brigade. While in command of the battalion he was awarded a Bar to his MC in August 1942, and he was made a Companion of the Distinguished Service Order on 19 August 1943. Darling was promoted to temporary lieutenant colonel on 7 March 1943. On 19 August 1945 he was awarded a Bar to his DSO.

Darling became commander of 133rd Infantry Brigade in May 1959, Chief of British Mission to Soviet Forces in Europe in January 1963 and, after being promoted to major-general on 9 December 1963, he became General Officer Commanding 53rd (Welsh) Division/District of the Territorial Army in December 1963. He went on to be General Officer Commanding Wales in April 1967. He retired from the army in May 1968 and was invested as a Companion of the Order of the Bath.

== Personal life ==
He married Cynthia Labouchere, the daughter of Arthur Labouchere and Dorothy Timson, on 28 April 1939 in Westminster. They had a daughter and two sons.

Military offices
Preceded by Richard Frisby	GOC 53rd (Welsh) Infantry Division/District; 1963−1967	Succeeded by Post Disbanded
New title	GOC Wales; 1967−1968	Succeeded by Jeremy Spencer-Smith
