= John Woodrow =

British Army general

Major-General John Woodrow MBE
- Born: 1919
- Died: 1988 (aged 68–69)
- Military career
- Allegiance: United Kingdom
- Branch: British Army
- Rank: Major-General
- Commands: 1 Divisional Signal Regiment; Royal Signals Training Group; Wales
- Conflicts: Second World War
- Awards: Member of the Order of the British Empire

Major-General Albert John Woodrow MBE (1919–1988) was a British Army officer.

== Military career ==
Woodrow was commissioned into the Royal Corps of Signals on 25 May 1940 during the Second World War. He became commanding officer of 1 Divisional Signal Regiment at Verden an der Aller in Germany in 1961. He went on to be Commander of the Royal Signals Training Group in 1965, Director of Army Public Relations in 1968 and General Officer Commanding Wales in 1970 before retiring in 1973.

Military offices
| Preceded by Jeremy Spencer-Smith | General Officer Commanding Wales; 1970–1973 | Succeeded by Peter Leuchars |
