= Hugh Oldman =

British Army officer

Sir Hugh Oldman
- Colonel Hugh Oldman in 1970

Personal information
- Full name: Hugh Richard Deare Oldman
- Born: 24 June 1914; Belgaum, British India
- Died: 26 November 1988 (aged 74); Saluda, Virginia, US
- Batting: Right-handed
- Role: Wicket-keeper

Domestic team information
- Years: Team
- 1954–55: Baluchistan

Career statistics
Competition	First-class
Matches	1
Runs scored	23
Batting average	11.50
100s/50s	0/0
Top score	16
Catches/stumpings	2/0
- Source: Cricinfo, 24 March 2019

Colonel Sir Hugh Richard Deare Oldman KBE, MC (24 June 1914 – 26 November 1988) was a British Army officer who later served as Secretary for Defence of the Sultanate of Oman. He was one of the major participants in the coup d'état in July 1970 that brought Sultan Qaboos to the throne of Oman. He also played first-class cricket in Pakistan.

== Early life ==
Born in Belgaum in India in 1914, the eldest son of Major General Richard Oldman, Hugh Oldman was educated at Wellington College, Berkshire, and the Royal Military Academy Sandhurst. He served as a constable with the London Metropolitan Police from August 1936 to June 1937.

== British military career ==
Oldman joined the East Yorkshire Regiment and, as a captain, won the Military Cross in North Africa in 1942. He assumed command of his battalion in June 1944 and, in August, of the 8th Battalion Durham Light Infantry, following the death of its commanding officer in action. He commanded the 8th Battalion during the advance through Northern France and Belgium, including the fierce fighting at Gheel. He was awarded the Croix de Guerre (Palme) in 1944.

He was seconded to the Sudan Defence Force from 1947 to 1951, and held a staff appointment in Pakistan from 1953 to 1956. He was awarded the Pakistan Republic Medal in 1956. While serving in Baluchistan he played a match of first-class cricket in Quetta for Baluchistan in the Quaid-e-Azam Trophy in 1954.

Oldman was deputy commander of the Aden Protectorate Levies in 1959 and 1960, and deputy commander of the armed forces of Oman from 1961 to 1964. He was awarded the OBE in 1961. After a period in the headquarters of Allied Forces Southern Europe, he retired from the army in 1967.

== Career in Oman ==
Oldman returned to Oman after retiring from the army and was appointed Oman's military secretary in February 1970. Substantial numbers of Oman's armed forces were Baluchi mercenaries. Oldman successfully urged Sultan Said bin Taimur to expand the armed services, with assistance from the United Kingdom, in response to insurgent activities.

Notwithstanding these improvements, by the middle of 1970 the British Foreign and Commonwealth Office was convinced that Oman could only be stabilised and modernised under the Sultan's son, Sultan Qaboos. After initial reluctance Oldman concurred, and helped to organise the bloodless coup that overthrew Sultan Said bin Taimur and installed Sultan Qaboos on the throne. In the weeks immediately after the coup, Oldman headed the Advisory Council that oversaw government functions. He was awarded the Order of Oman, Special Class, in 1971, and was knighted (KBE) in 1974.
