= Jeremy Spencer-Smith =

British Army general

Major-General Jeremy Spencer-Smith CB OBE MC
- Born: 28 July 1917
- Military career
- Allegiance: United Kingdom
- Branch: British Army
- Rank: Major-General
- Commands: 148th Infantry Brigade; Wales
- Conflicts: Second World War
- Awards: Officer of the Order of the British Empire; Military Cross

Major-General Jeremy Michael Spencer-Smith CB OBE MC (28 July 1917 – 1985) was a British Army officer.

== Military career ==
Educated at Eton College and New College, Oxford, Spencer-Smith was commissioned into the Welsh Guards on 4 July 1940 during the Second World War. He became commander of 148th Infantry Brigade in March 1964, Deputy Director of Manning at the Ministry of Defence in April 1967 and General Officer Commanding Wales in April 1968. He went on to become Director of Manning at the Ministry of Defence in June 1970 before retiring in June 1972.

Military offices
Preceded by Douglas Darling	General Officer Commanding Wales; 1968–1970	Succeeded by John Woodrow
