= Andrew Massey (British Army officer) =

British Army officer (1943–1998)

- Born: 18 April 1943; Carlisle, Cumberland, England
- Died: 19 August 1998 (aged 55); Hereford, England
- Military career
- Allegiance: United Kingdom
- Branch: British Army
- Service years: 1964–1993
- Rank: Brigadier
- Nickname: Andy
- Service number: 475200
- Units: Royal Army Service Corps; Royal Corps of Transport; Special Air Service
- Commands: 22 SAS Regiment
- Conflicts: Oman; Dhofar; Operation Banner
- Awards: Officer of the Order of the British Empire; Mentioned in Despatches

Brigadier Andrew Christopher "Andy" Massey OBE (18 April 1943 – 19 August 1998) was a British Army officer who served in Oman, Dhofar and Northern Ireland. He was a commander of the 22 SAS Regiment before retiring as a Brigadier.

== Early life ==
Massey was born on 18 April 1943 at Carlisle, Cumberland. He was educated at Welbeck College and Royal Military Academy Sandhurst.

== Military career ==
Officer Cadet Massey Royal Military Academy Sandhurst was commissioned as second lieutenant into the Royal Army Service Corps on 20 December 1963, and he was posted to serve with the transport squadron of 7th Artillery Brigade. Massey was promoted lieutenant on 20 June 1965. After a year with the Royal Corps of Transport Movement (RCT) he joined 63 Parachute Squadron (RCT) in February 1967 as a lieutenant. Two years later the squadron became the first to reinforce troops in Northern Ireland. On 20 December 1969 he was promoted Captain.

After this tour he was recommended for the SAS and after passing selection in 1970 he joined "A Squadron" in 1971 as Troop Captain.

Massey served in the Oman and Dhofar on three tours, before he rejoined the Airborne Forces as Staff Captain of HQ No. 16 Parachute Brigade where he made further tours of Northern Ireland.

In 1975 he attended Staff College at Camberley, Surrey following which he was promoted major on 31 December 1975, and posted posting was as a Staff Officer, at HQ Northern Ireland from 1977 to 1979.

Massey and his wife, Major Annabelle Cunningham (married 1977), went to Buckingham Palace to receive his Member of the Order of the British Empire which was awarded in January 1980.

In the summer of 1979 he was appointed to command "A Squadron" 22 SAS Regiment a position he held until his promotion to lieutenant-colonel in 1981 when he became an instructor at Camberley leading the Counter Revolutionary Warfare Team. In 1982 he was appointed the Special Forces Liaison Officer at HQ Commander-in Chief Fleet in Northwood, Middlesex during the Falklands War.

Massey won the US Armed Forces Staff College Leadership Prize in 1984 before succeeding to command of 22 SAS Regiment from Lieutenant-Colonel Michael Rose. He was promoted colonel on 31 December 1987, and in 1988 was himself succeeded as commander of 22 SAS Regiment by Lieutenant-Colonel Cedric Delves, DSO.

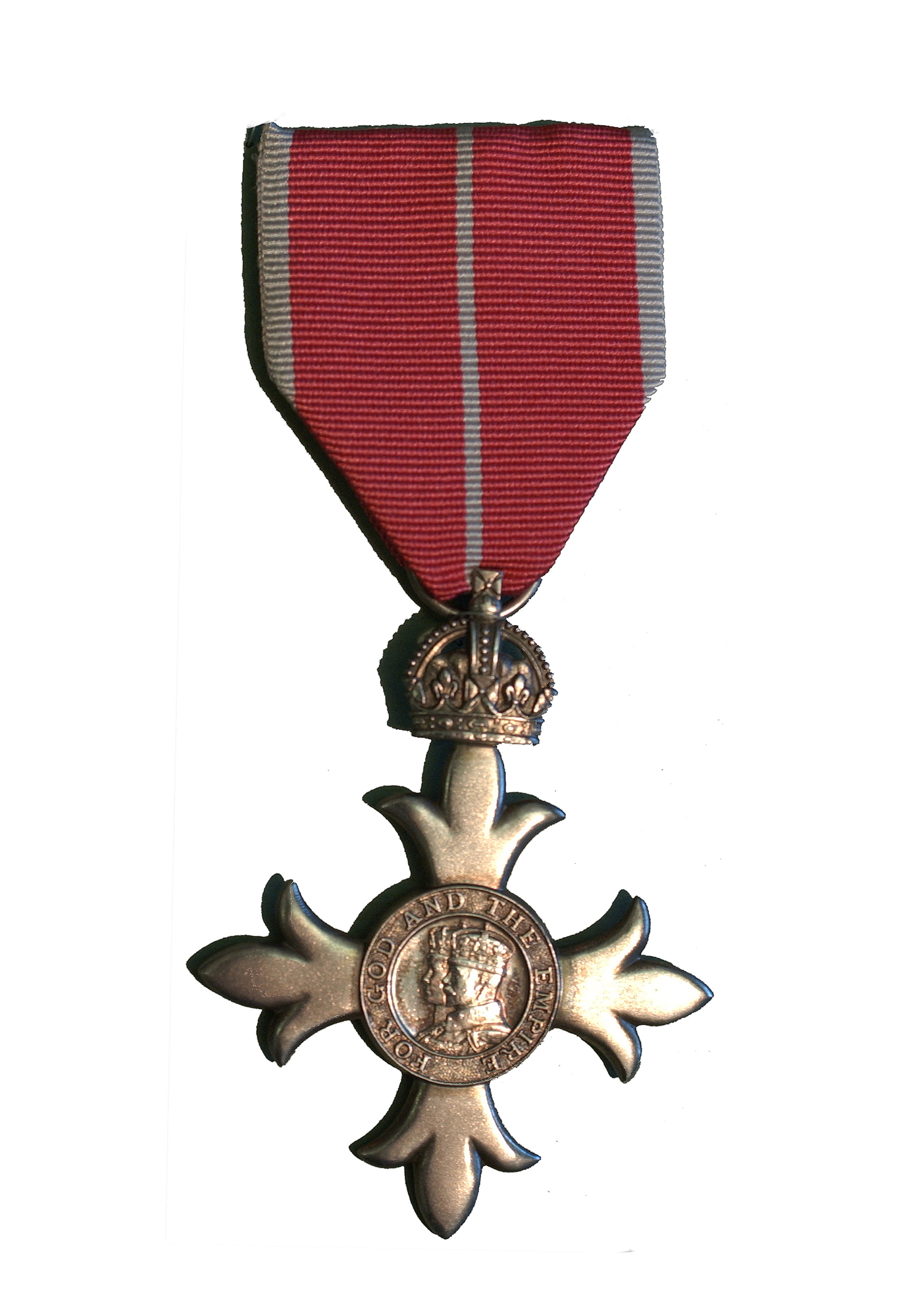
MBE – Member of the Order of the British Empire (silver)

From 1988 he was responsible for the UK Commitment in the Far East and Africa at the Ministry of Defence. Massey was appointed Deputy Director of Special Forces in 1990 and when the Gulf War broke out, he was appointed Operational Commander of the UK Special Forces for Operation Granby for which he received a belated Mention in Despatches. On 30 June 1992 he was promoted to Brigadier and returned to his parent corps as Commandant of Royal Corps of Transport Training Centre in Aldershot.

He retired from the Army on 1 November 1993.

== Later career ==
Defence Systems Ltd and Director of Welsh TEC.

== Sports ==
Massey was a committed sportsman, particularly football and golf. He was Chairman of the Army Football Association and before leaving the Army he presented the Massey Trophy to be contested each season by the corps teams and which represents a highly prized corps football competition within the Army.

== Death ==
He died at Hereford, Herefordshire on 19 August 1998, reportedly in a drowning accident.

== Honours and decorations ==
- Member of the Order of the British Empire (MBE) in January 1980
- Officer of the Order of the British Empire (OBE) in January 1988
- Mentioned in Despatches awarded in April 1994 for his services in Operation Granby
