= Ian Bryant (academic) =

British computer scientist

Professor Ian Bryant
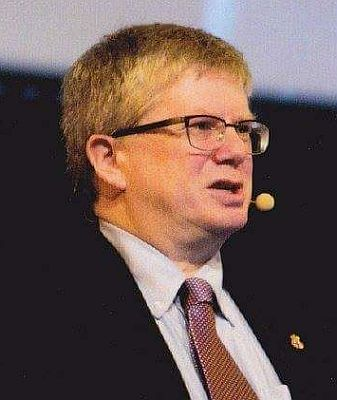
- Born: 1965 (age 60–61); England
- Education: Taunton School; University of Leicester
- Occupation: Academic
- Years active: 1980s –
- Known for: ITSafe, CCT Mark, SSRDI-TSI-ACTS

Ian Bryant (born 1965) is a British academic engineer. He currently is mainly focused on leading UK Defence's activity on evolving Emanations Protection, whilst remaining a well known advocate for Trustworthy Software and Systems, and is active in Standardisation.

== Current roles ==
Ian Bryant is currently known for several roles:

- Protection of Emanations (security and dependability of signals and equipments across the electromagnetic, magnetic, acoustic, and quantum realms), for both Governmental and Industrial domains, as the inaugural UK Ministry of Defence (MOD) Departmental Emanations Protection Authority (DEPA)
- Promoting Trustworthy Software and Systems (currently as the Honorary Secretary, and Standardisation Advisor, of the Advisory Committee on Trustworthy Systems (ACTS), working with the Trustworthy Software Foundation)
- Standards Coherence, predominantly with the British Standards Institution (BSI) and its international linked SDO (Standards Development Organisations)
- As Adjunct and Visiting Faculty in Academia

== Early and personal life ==
Ian Bryant was educated at Taunton School in Somerset, and the University of Leicester where he studied Engineering.

== Career ==
Ian Bryant has been a Professional Systems Engineer employed by HM Government for much of his career, either as a technical specialist and/or project manager, with assignments spanning a variety of organisations, including Cabinet Office, MOD, National Archives, National Policing, and the former National Infrastructure Security Coordination Centre (now CPNI). He has also spent several years seconded to academia.

His background is in electronic engineering, encompassing roles in what is now called Emanations Protection (a superset of the HM Government Technical Security Dimension) since the 1980s.

In parallel, he has also been involved with "Cyber Security" (and its various predecessor terms) since the 1980s, in a variety of roles including Investigation / Incident Response, Security Architecture, Systems Accreditation, Research and Technology Management, and Policy Development.

His work on Trustworthy Software originated with leading the original Cabinet Office (CSIA) study on Secure Software Development (SSD), then being the Technical Manager for the Pilot Operation of the CSIA (latterly CESG) Claims Tested Mark (CCT Mark) Scheme.

Subsequently, he contributed to the Technology Strategy Board (TSB) Cyber Security Knowledge Transfer Network (CSKTN) Special Interest Group (SIG) on Secure Software Development, and latterly lead the Secure Software Development Partnership's (SSDP) SIG on Standards, before the formalisation of the Software Security, Dependability and Resilience Initiative (SSDRI – the original name for TSI) in July 2011, running it latterly as the Trustworthy Software Initiative (TSI) under funding from the first National Cyber Security Programme (NCSP) till 2016. This led to a Ministerial launch of a BS Publicly Available Specification (PAS754, now BS10754-1), and included efforts to gain international cooperation through NATO.

He also developed, and led a Ministerial launch, of the IT Security Awareness for Everyone (ITSafe) service — now part of GetSafeOnline, and helped found the former National Information Assurance Forum (NIAF – formerly "GIPSI").

== Research Interests ==
As a publishing academic, his interests include:

- Acting as Principal Investigator (PI) for the multi-institution Challenges in Risk Understanding ("CRU") Research Theme
- Leading work on Trustworthiness of Systems, extending from previous published work on Systems' Security Verification, and on Critical Infrastructure Protection
- Defining Security / Dependability aspects of Signals and related Equipments (a.k.a. Emanations Protection) across Electromagnetic, Magnetic, Acoustic, and Quantum realms
- Aligning Security and Information Management, including leading a NATO Research Group on XML labelling, and being the lead Information Security specialist for the European Commission (EC) funded MS3i and NEISAS Projects.

== Academic Affiliations ==
Ian Bryant has been active in Academia for 3 decades, including:

- Visiting Faculty at the former Royal Military College of Science
- Visiting Faculty at the Defence School of Communications and Information Systems
- Visiting Faculty at the former Civil Service College (CSC), latterly National School of Government (NSG)
- Adjunct Faculty at De Montfort University Cyber Security Centre (CSC), both in Teaching and Research roles
- Adjunct Professor at University of Warwick Cyber Security Centre (CSC), both as Teaching Faculty, and as a Publishing Researcher
- Adjunct Professor at Loughborough University , working with both the Cyber Institute, and the EMEHub, as a Publishing Researcher

== Standards Affiliations ==
Ian Bryant's has been active in Standardisation for decades, including multiple terms as UK Expert Committee Chair, for which he has reached term limits. He continues to be active with:

- BSI GEL/210 - Electromagnetics (shadowing IEC CISPR, IEC SC77, and CLC TC210)
- BSI ICT/003 - Project Committee for BS10754 Series on Trustworthy Systems (replacing PAS754)
- BSI IDT/1/6 - Protective Markings
- BSI IST/033 - Expert Committee on Information Security (UK shadow for ISO/IEC JTC1 SC27)
- BSI TCT/201 - Telecommunications (shadowing ETSI TC Cyber and ETSI TC ERM, and linkages to ITU-T)

Internationally, he engages with ISO, IEC, ITU-T, CEN, CENELEC, and ETSI.

== Professional Affiliations ==
- Fellow of the Institution of Analysts and Programmers (FIAP)
- Fellow of the Royal Society for the Encouragement of Arts, Manufactures and Commerce (FRSA)
- Member of the Institute of Engineering and Technology [MIET)
