= British intelligence agencies =

Government organisations in the UK

The Government of the United Kingdom maintains several intelligence agencies that deal with secret intelligence. These agencies are responsible for collecting, analysing and exploiting foreign and domestic intelligence, providing military intelligence, performing espionage and counter-espionage. Their intelligence assessments contribute to the conduct of the foreign relations of the United Kingdom, maintaining the national security of the United Kingdom, military planning, public safety, and law enforcement in the United Kingdom. The four main agencies are the Secret Intelligence Service (SIS or MI6), the Security Service (MI5), the Government Communications Headquarters (GCHQ) and Defence Intelligence (DI). The agencies are organised under three government departments, the Foreign Office, the Home Office and the Ministry of Defence.

The history of the organisations dates back to the 19th century or earlier. The British intelligence system as we know it today – with components for domestic, foreign, military, and communications intelligence – emerged in the years immediately preceding the First World War. Decryption of the Zimmermann Telegram in 1917 was described as the most significant intelligence triumph for Britain during World War I, and one of the earliest occasions on which a piece of signals intelligence influenced world events. During the Second World War and afterwards, many observers regarded Ultra signals intelligence as immensely valuable to the Allies of World War II. In 1962, during the Cuban Missile Crisis, GCHQ interceptions of Soviet ship positions were sent directly to the White House. Intelligence cooperation in the post-war period between the United Kingdom and the United States became the cornerstone of Western intelligence gathering and the "Special Relationship" between the United Kingdom and the United States.

== UK Intelligence Community ==
The UK Intelligence Community consists of the following.

=== Leadership ===
- National Security Council
- Joint Intelligence Committee

==== Administration ====
The National Security Adviser (NSA) is a senior official in the Cabinet Office, based in Whitehall, who serves as the principal adviser to the prime minister of the United Kingdom and Cabinet of the United Kingdom on all national security issues.

=== Oversight ===
The Intelligence and Security Committee of Parliament oversees the policies, expenditure, administration and operations of the UK Intelligence Community. Complaints are heard by the Investigatory Powers Tribunal. Other oversight is provided by the Investigatory Powers Commissioner and the Independent Reviewer of Terrorism Legislation.

=== Agencies and other groups ===
The following agencies, groups and organisations fall under the remit of the Intelligence and Security Committee of Parliament:

	Parent department	Agency	Description of role	Personnel
Intelligence and security agencies	Foreign Office	Secret Intelligence Service (SIS/MI6)	Covert overseas collection and analysis of human intelligence	3,644
Intelligence and security agencies	Foreign Office	Government Communications Headquarters (GCHQ)	Signals intelligence, cryptanalysis and information assurance	7,181
Intelligence and security agencies	Home Office	Security Service (MI5)	Counter-intelligence and internal security	5,259
Military intelligence	Ministry of Defence	Military Intelligence Services (MIS)	All-source military intelligence gathering and analysis	4,115
Military intelligence	Ministry of Defence	Defence Counter-Intelligence Unit (DCIU)	Counter-intelligence to disrupt and deter hostile activity	
Other intelligence and security organisations and groups	Cabinet Office	National Security Secretariat	Support the National Security Council and the Joint Intelligence Committee by providing coordination on strategic issues, all-source intelligence analysis, and policy advice to the Prime Minister and other senior ministers.	
Other intelligence and security organisations and groups	Cabinet Office	Joint Intelligence Organisation	Support the National Security Council and the Joint Intelligence Committee by providing coordination on strategic issues, all-source intelligence analysis, and policy advice to the Prime Minister and other senior ministers.	
Other intelligence and security organisations and groups	Home Office	Homeland Security Group	Counter terrorism and protecting critical national infrastructure	1,061
Other intelligence and security organisations and groups	Foreign Office and Ministry of Defence	National Cyber Force	Offensive cyber activity	

==== National technical authorities ====
The UK has three specialist National Technical Authorities (NTAs) that provide protective security advice across government, critical national infrastructure, and sensitive sectors to defend against terrorism and hostile state activities:

- National Cyber Security Centre (NCSC), a child agency of GCHQ, responsible for cyber security and information assurance;
- National Protective Security Authority (NPSA), a child agency of MI5, responsible for physical and personnel protective security;
- UK National Authority for Counter Eavesdropping (UK NACE), part of FCDO Services, responsible for defending government and national infrastructure against technical espionage and close-access threats.

==== Other government and national centres ====
- HM Government Communications Centre (HMGCC), designs and develops electronics and software to support the communication needs of the UK Government and the UK Intelligence Community.
- National Centre for Information Defence, which detects and disrupts foreign information attacks.

== History ==
=== Origins ===
Organised intelligence collection and planning for the Government of the United Kingdom and the British Empire was established during the 19th century. The War Office, responsible for the administration of the British Army, formed the Intelligence Branch in 1873, which became the Directorate of Military Intelligence. The Admiralty, responsible for command of the Royal Navy, formed the Foreign Intelligence Committee in 1882, which evolved into the Naval Intelligence Department (NID) in 1887.

The Committee of Imperial Defence, established in 1902, was responsible for research, and some co-ordination, on issues of military strategy.

The Secret Service Bureau was founded in 1909 as a joint initiative of the Admiralty and the War Office to control secret intelligence operations in the UK and overseas, particularly concentrating on the activities of the Imperial German government. The Bureau operated alongside but independently of the military. It was split into naval and army sections which, over time, specialised in foreign espionage and internal counter-espionage activities respectively. This specialisation, formalised before 1914, was a result of the Admiralty intelligence requirements related to the maritime strength of the Imperial German Navy.

=== First World War ===
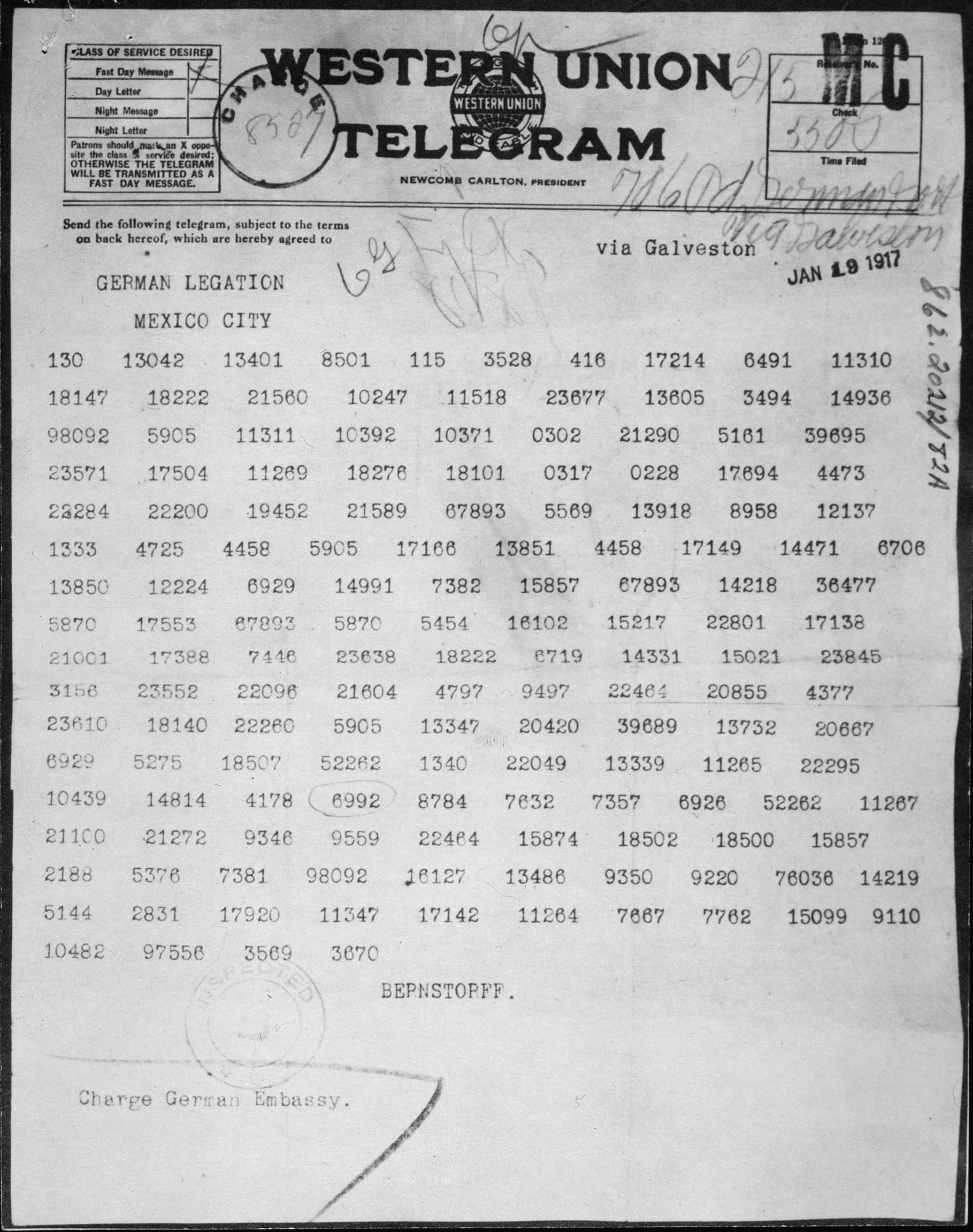
The Zimmermann Telegram as it was sent from Washington, DC, to Ambassador Heinrich von Eckardt, the German ambassador to Mexico.

In 1916, during the First World War, the two sections underwent administrative changes so that the internal counter-espionage section became the Directorate of Military Intelligence Section 5 (MI5) and the foreign section became the Directorate of Military Intelligence Section 6 (MI6), names by which the Security Service and Secret Intelligence Service are commonly known today.

The Naval Intelligence Division led the Royal Navy's highly successful cryptographic efforts, Room 40 (later known as NID25). The decryption of the Zimmermann Telegram was described as the most significant intelligence triumph for Britain during World War I, and one of the earliest occasions on which a piece of signals intelligence influenced world events.

The Imperial War Cabinet was the British Empire's wartime coordinating body.

=== Interwar ===
In 1919, the Cabinet's Secret Service Committee recommended that a peacetime codebreaking agency should be created. Staff were merged from NID25 and MI1b into the new organisation, which was given the cover-name the "Government Code and Cypher School" (GC&CS).

The Joint Intelligence Committee (JIC) was founded in 1936 as a sub-committee of the Committee of Imperial Defence.

=== Second World War ===
Following the outbreak of the Second World War in 1939, the JIC became the senior intelligence assessment body for the United Kingdom government. During the War, the RAF Intelligence Branch was established, although personnel had been employed in intelligence duties in the RAF since its formation in 1918. The Special Operations Executive (SOE) was operational from 1940 until early 1946. SOE conducted espionage, sabotage and reconnaissance in occupied Europe and later in occupied Southeast Asia against the Axis powers and aided local resistance movements.

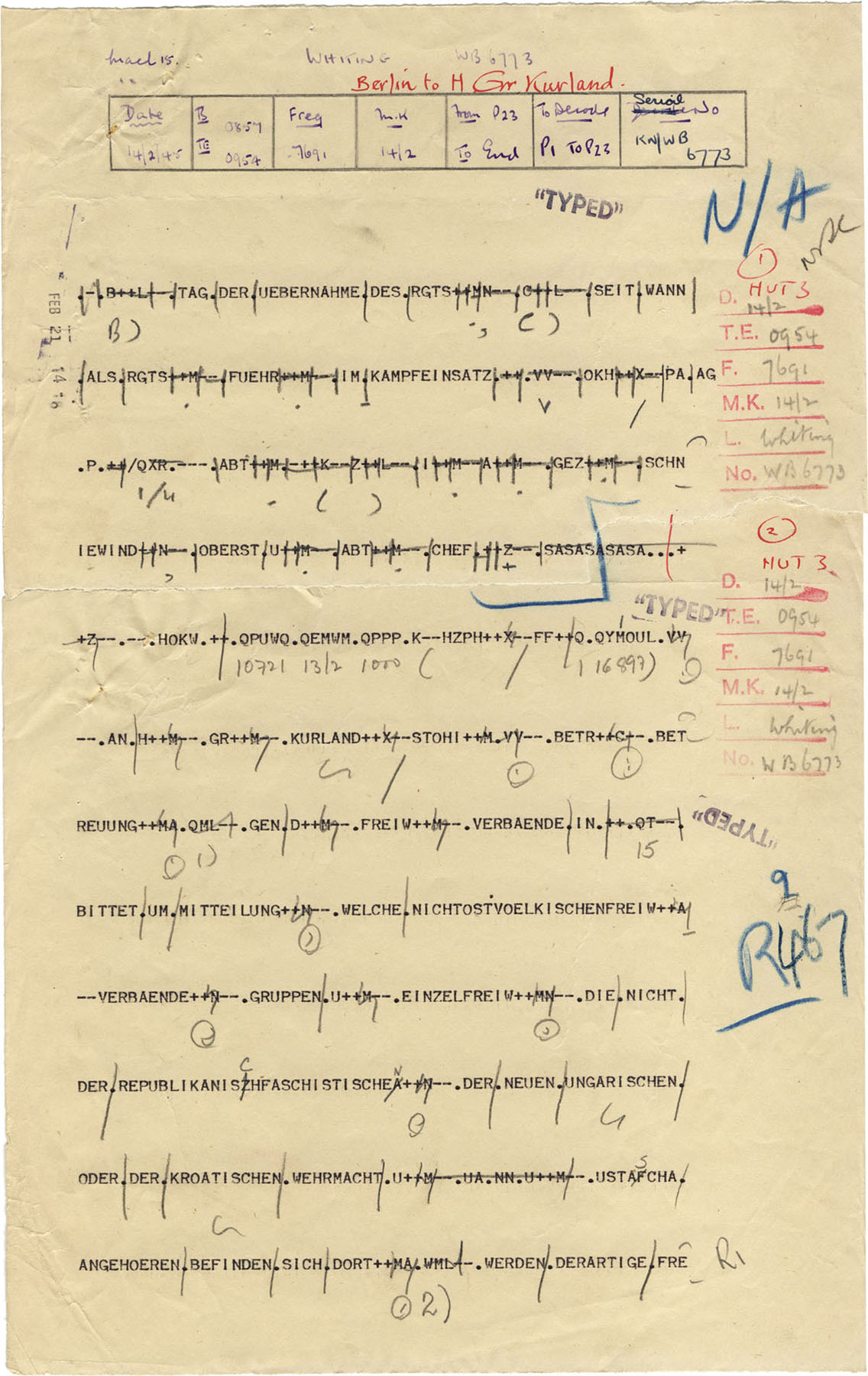
A typical Bletchley Park intercept sheet of an Enigma machine message, after decryption.

The 1943 British–US Communication Intelligence Agreement, BRUSA, connected the signal intercept networks of the GC&CS and counterparts in the U.S. The GC&CS was based largely at Bletchley Park. Its staff, including Alan Turing, worked on cryptanalysis of the Enigma (codenamed Ultra) and Lorenz cipher, and also a large number of other enemy systems. Winston Churchill was reported to have told King George VI, when presenting to him Stewart Menzies (head of the Secret Intelligence Service and the person who controlled distribution of Ultra decrypts to the government): "It is thanks to the secret weapon of General Menzies, put into use on all the fronts, that we won the war!" F. W. Winterbotham quoted the western Supreme Allied Commander, Dwight D. Eisenhower, at war's end describing Ultra as having been "decisive" to Allied victory. Sir Harry Hinsley, Bletchley Park veteran and official historian of British Intelligence in World War II, made a similar assessment about Ultra, saying that it shortened the war "by not less than two years and probably by four years"; and that, in the absence of Ultra, it is uncertain how the war would have ended.

=== Cold War ===
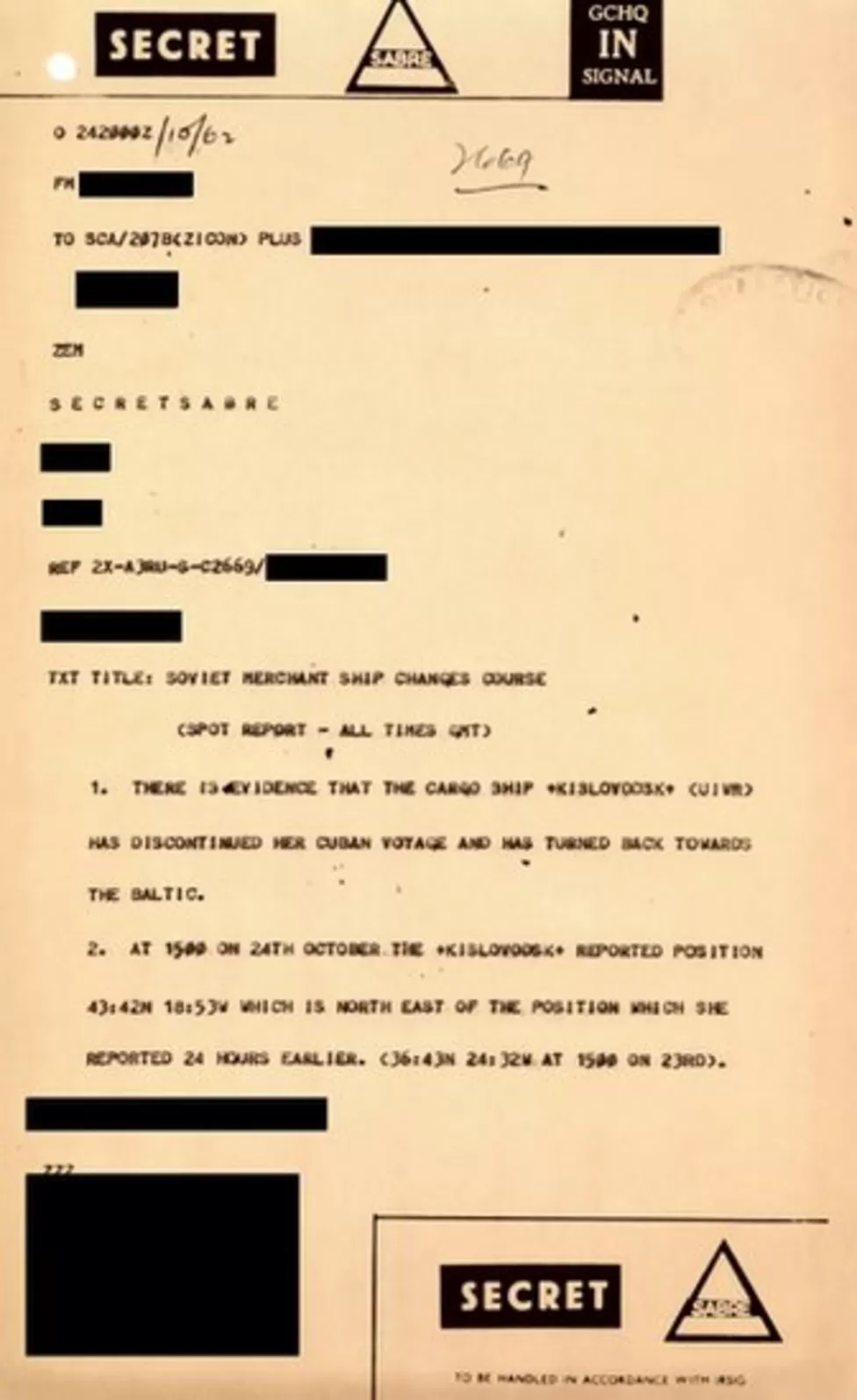
Declassified GCHQ report of Soviet ship positions, which played a key role in resolving the Cuban Missile Crisis.

The Government Code and Cypher School was renamed the "Government Communications Headquarters" (GCHQ) in 1946. The Joint Intelligence Bureau (JIB) was established the same year. It was structured into a series of divisions: procurement (JIB 1), geographic (JIB 2 and JIB 3), defences, ports and beaches (JIB 4), airfields (JIB 5), key points (JIB 6), oil (JIB 7) and telecommunications (JIB 8).

A British military radio operator working at the British Embassy in Moscow discovered in 1951 a listening device, The Thing, at the residence of the US ambassador to the Soviet Union, Spaso House when he happened to tune into Soviet monitoring.

Wartime signals intelligence cooperation between the United Kingdom and the United States continued in the post-war period. The two countries signed the bilateral UKUSA Agreement in 1948. Later broadened to include Canada, Australia and New Zealand, known as the Five Eyes, as well as cooperation with several "third-party" nations, this became the cornerstone of Western intelligence gathering and the "Special Relationship" between the UK and the USA. Since World War II, the chief of the London station of the U.S. Central Intelligence Agency has attended the Joint Intelligence Committee's weekly meetings. One former US intelligence officer has described this as the "highlight of the job" for the London CIA chief. Resident intelligence chiefs from Australia, Canada, and New Zealand may attend when certain issues are discussed.

The Joint Intelligence Committee moved to the Cabinet Office in 1957 with its assessments staff who prepared intelligence assessments for the committee to consider.

During the Cuban Missile Crisis, GCHQ Scarborough intercepted radio communications from Soviet ships reporting their positions and used that to establish where they were heading. A copy of the report was sent directly to the White House Situation Room, providing initial indications of Soviet intentions with regard to the US naval blockade of Cuba.

When the Ministry of Defence was formed in 1964, the Joint Intelligence Bureau, Naval Intelligence, Military Intelligence and Air Intelligence were combined to form the Defence Intelligence Staff (DIS). The DIS focussed initially on Cold War issues.

As well as a mission to gather intelligence, GCHQ has for a long time had a corresponding mission to assist in the protection of the British government's communications. Building on the work of James H. Ellis in the late 1960s, Clifford Cocks invented a public-key cryptography algorithm in 1973 (equivalent to what would become, in 1978, the RSA algorithm), which was shared with the National Security Agency in the United States.

The Security Service Act 1989 established the legal basis of the Security Service (MI5) for the first time under the government led by Margaret Thatcher. GCHQ and the Secret Intelligence Service (MI6) were placed on a statutory footing by the Intelligence Services Act 1994 under the government led by John Major.

=== 21st century ===
The National Infrastructure Security Coordination Centre (NISCC) and the National Security Advice Centre (NSAC) were formed in 1999. NISCC's role was to provide advice to companies operating critical national infrastructure, and NSAC was a unit within MI5 that provided security advice to other parts of the UK government. The Centre for the Protection of National Infrastructure (CPNI) was formed as a child agency of MI5 in 2007, merging the NISCC and NSAC. CPNI provided integrated security advice (combining information, personnel, and physical) to the businesses and organisations which made up the critical national infrastructure. In 2016, the cybersecurity-related aspects of the CPNI's role were taken over by the newly-formed National Cyber Security Centre (NCSC), a child agency of GCHQ. The CPNI evolved into the National Protective Security Authority (NPSA) in 2023, taking on a remit beyond critical national infrastructure.

The Office for Security and Counter-Terrorism (OSCT) was created in 2007 and is responsible for leading work on counter-terrorism working closely with the police and security services. The OSCT was renamed the Homeland Security Group in 2021.

The Defence Intelligence Staff changed its name to Defence Intelligence (DI) in 2009. Defence Intelligence has a unique position within the UK intelligence community as an 'all-source' intelligence function. It became part of the unified Military Intelligence Services (MIS) in December 2025 to create a single operational structure across the British Armed Forces, alongside a newly created Defence Counter-Intelligence Unit (DCIU).

The National Security Council (NSC) was established in 2010, reestablishing the central coordination of national security issues seen in the Committee of Imperial Defence. The Joint Intelligence Organisation was formalised to provide intelligence assessment and advice on development of the UK intelligence community's analytical capability for the Joint Intelligence Committee and NSC.

The heads of the Five Eyes domestic security agencies gave a public presentation together for the first time in 2023. The MI6 chief and the CIA director made their first-ever joint remarks in an opinion piece in the Financial Times in 2024.

A National Centre for Information Defence was created in September 2026 to detect and disrupt foreign information attacks.

== Budget ==
=== Single Intelligence Account ===
The Single Intelligence Account (SIA) is the funding vehicle for the three main security and intelligence agencies: the Secret Intelligence Service (SIS/MI6), Government Communications Headquarters (GCHQ) and the Security Service (MI5). Spending on the SIA was £5.8 billion in financial year 2025/2026.

In 2025, the Prime Minister announced the intention to recognise UK Intelligence Community spending as part of defence spending, so contributing to the spending of 2.6% of GDP on defence by 2027.

=== Military Intelligence Services ===
Military Intelligence Services (MIS), previously Defence Intelligence (DI), is an integral part of the Ministry of Defence (MoD) and is funded within the UK's defence budget.

== See also ==
- Counter Terrorism Command
- Club de Berne, an intelligence-sharing forum that includes the UK
- Five Eyes, an intelligence-sharing alliance that includes the UK
- Information Research Department
- Intelligence Corps (United Kingdom)
- List of intelligence agencies global list sorted by country
- Mass surveillance in the United Kingdom
- UK cyber security community
