= PAS754 =

British software standard, 2014 to 2018

BS PAS 754:2014 is a British Standards Institution (BSI) software Publicly Available Specification, published in May 2014. BS PAS 754:2014 was withdrawn following the publication of BS 10754-1:2018 in February 2018.

The PAS defines the overall principles for effective software trustworthiness, and includes technical, physical, cultural and behavioral measures alongside effective leadership and governance. It also identifies the necessary tools, techniques and processes and addresses safety, reliability, availability, security and resilience issues.

== Structure of the standard ==
The official title of the standard is "Software Trustworthiness – Governance and management – Specification".

PAS 754:2014 has seven main clauses, plus three annexes, which cover:

0. Introduction
1. Scope
2. Normative References
3. Terms, definitions and acronyms
4. Approach
5. Concepts
6. Principles
Annex A. System Lifecycle
Annex B. Techniques
Bibliography

== Development ==
The development of PAS754 has been led by the Trustworthy Software Initiative, a UK government sponsored Public Good activity aimed at Making Software Better.

The following organizations were involved in the development of this specification: Atkins Group; BIS; CPNI; Certification Europe; De Montfort University; Group 5 Training; IET; Microsoft (UK); MISRA; Nexor; Oxford Brookes University; QinetiQ; TechUK and University of Warwick.
