= European Medicines Agency data breach =

In December 2020 the European Medicines Agency announced that it had been targeted in a cyberattack. The agency announced that it had opened a full investigation in close cooperation with law enforcement and other entities but declined to give details of the attack while the investigation was ongoing.

In a separate announcement BioNTech said that files relating to the COVID-19 vaccine it had developed with Pfizer had been unlawfully accessed after a cyberattack on the EMA. BioNTech also said that "No BioNTech or Pfizer systems have been breached in connection with this incident and we are unaware of any personal data of study participants being accessed."

Neither the dates nor the methods of the cyberattack were revealed, nor who the perpetrators were.

The National Cyber Security Centre in the United Kingdom announced that it was studying the situation and how it would affect the UK. The UK is the first country where the BioNTech/Pfizer vaccine was deployed.

== Russia and China accused ==
In March 2021 the Dutch newspaper De Volkskrant published an article saying "sources close to the investigation" has disclosed that a Russian intelligence agency and Chinese spies were behind the attacks.
