= Advisory Committee on Trustworthy Systems =

The Advisory Committee on Trustworthy Systems
- Founded: 2016
- Type: Not For Profit
- Purpose: Software Development
- Location: London, United Kingdom
- Origins: Trustworthy Software Initiative (TSI)
- Region served: UK
- Method: Standards and their Verification
- Key people: Tim Watson (academic) (Chair); Ian Bryant (academic) (Honorary Secretary)
- Website: acts-public.github.io

The Advisory Committee on Trustworthy Systems (ACTS) is a UK Public Good activity for Making Systems Better.

== Trustworthiness ==
The work of ACTS is based on there being five facets of trustworthiness:

- Safety - The ability of the system to operate without harmful states
- Reliability - The ability of the system to deliver services as specified
- Availability - The ability of the system to deliver services when requested
- Resilience - The ability of the system to transform, renew, and recover in timely response to events
- Security - The ability of the system to remain protected against accidental or deliberate attacks

This definition of trustworthiness was expanded by precursor activities from a widely used dependability definition, which involved the addition of a 5th Facet of Resilience, derived from the UK Government approach.

== Role and Responsibilities ==
The Advisory Committee on Trustworthy Systems (ACTS) provides an independent, not-for-profit, UK Public Good focus for Making Systems Better, and is constituted from representatives from, in alphabetical order, Academia, Government, Professional Bodies, Regulators, Standards Development Organisations (SDO), and Trade Bodies.

Its primary Responsibilities are the curation of both the Trustworthy Systems Framework (TFSr) -- the core, Normative, Adopted Specifications (AS), and supporting, Informative, Exemplar Templates (ET) -- and associated Training, Education, and Awareness (TEA) materials.

== History ==
ACTS evolved from a number of previous activities:

- A study by the Cabinet Office, Central Sponsor for Information Assurance (CSIA) in 2004-5 which identified a pervasive lack of secure software development practices as a matter for concern
- A Department of Trade and Industry (DTI – predecessor of BIS) Global Watch Report in 2006 which noted a relative lack of secure software development practices in the UK
- The Technology Strategy Board (TSB) Cyber Security Knowledge Transfer Network (CSKTN) Special Interest Group (SIG) on Secure Software Development (SSD, 2007–8)
- The TSB / Foreign and Commonwealth Office (FCO) Science and Innovation Network (SIN) Multinational Workshop “Challenges to building in … information security, privacy and assurance”, held in Paris in March 2009
- The Secure Software Development Partnership (SSDP) Study Period, funded jointly by the UK government' TSB and the Centre for the Protection of National Infrastructure (CPNI) organisations, which ran in 2009–2010
- The Trustworthy Software Initiative (TSI—originally Software Security, Dependability and Resilience Initiative—SSDRI), a UK public good activity sponsored by CPNI between 2011 and 2016

It, along with the Trustworthy Software Foundation, were formed in 2016 at the end of the first UK National Cyber Security Programme (NCSP) funding period, with the founding Chair of the ACTS being Sir Edmund Burton KBE, who was the President of the predecessor TSI.
