= Thicker Than Water (novel) =

2003 crime novel by Australian author Lindy Cameron

- Author: Lindy Cameron
- Language: English
- Series: Kat O'Malley
- Genre: Crime novel
- Publisher: HarperCollins Australia
- Publication date: 2003
- Publication place: Australia
- Media type: Print
- Pages: 502
- Awards: 2004 Davitt Award, Readers Choice, winner
- ISBN: 0732274982
- Preceded by: Bleeding Hearts
- Followed by: -

Thicker Than Water is a 2003 crime novel by Australian author Lindy Cameron.

It is the third in the author's Kat O'Malley series of novels, following Blood Guilt in 1999, and Bleeding Hearts in 2001.

It was the winner of the Readers Choice Davitt Award in 2004.

== Synopsis ==
Kat O'Malley becomes involved in the case of a murdered criminal, Gerry Anders, whose body has been found in a lesbian nightclub. But helping her friends get out of their troubles means that she ends up dealing with Queenie Riley, head of a local Melbourne crime family.

== Critical reception ==
Reviewing the novel for Australian Book Review Dianne Dempsey found that "Cameron's Melbourne is rushed, crowded and confusing. Kit rarely slows down as she hurtles down freeways, side streets and tawdry nightclubs. This busyness chokes the novel, both in terms of setting and action."

In The Advertiser Katherine England noted that "The plot thickens with more deaths, kidnappings and a serious serial killer as Kit - bewildered by cross-clan allegiances, befuddled by lust for the delicious Alex Cazenove, intrigued by a new female detective and always aided and abetted by the sisterhood - puzzles, fights and jokes her way to a tense denouement."

== Publication history ==
Following the novel's initial publication in 2003 by HarperCollins Australia, it was reprinted as follows:

- 2009 Bywater Books, USA
- 2014 Clan Destine Press, Australia

== Awards ==
- 2004 Davitt Award, Readers Choice, winner

== Notes ==
- Dedication: For Chele. My best friend and soul mate.

== See also ==
- 2003 in Australian literature
