= Robert Hayman-Joyce =

British Army general

Lieutenant General Sir Robert Hayman-Joyce KCB CBE DL
- Born: 16 October 1940 (age 85)
- Military career
- Allegiance: United Kingdom
- Branch: British Army
- Service years: 1963–1999
- Rank: Lieutenant General
- Service number: 474714
- Unit: 11th Hussars
- Commands: Royal Hussars
- Awards: Knight Commander of the Order of the Bath; Commander of the Order of the British Empire

Lieutenant General Sir Robert John Hayman-Joyce, KCB, CBE, DL (born 16 October 1940) is a retired British Army officer who served as Master-General of the Ordnance from 1995 to 1998.

== Military career ==
Hayman-Joyce was commissioned into the 11th Hussars in 1963. He was appointed commanding officer of the Royal Hussars in 1980. He then went on to be commander of the Royal Armoured Corps within British Army of the Rhine in 1983 and Deputy Commandant of the Royal Military College of Science in 1987.

Hayman-Joyce was made Director of the UK Tank Programme in 1988 and Director-General Fighting Vehicles in 1989. He was promoted to Director Royal Armoured Corps in 1992 and Military Secretary in 1994, before becoming Master-General of the Ordnance in 1995. He was appointed Deputy Chief of Defence Procurement in 1997. He retired in 1999.

Hayman-Joyce was also Colonel Commandant of the Royal Armoured Corps from 1995 to 1999.

== Retirement ==
In retirement Hayman-Joyce was a non-executive director of Alvis plc from 1999 to 2004 and has been non-executive chairman of Raytheon Systems Ltd since 2000. He was awarded an honorary Doctor of Science from Cranfield University in 1998.

Military offices
Preceded by Sir William Rous	Military Secretary; 1994–1995	Succeeded by Michael Scott
Preceded by Sir Jeremy Blacker	Master-General of the Ordnance; 1995–1998	Succeeded by David Jenkins
