= NCID =

NCID may refer to:

- Network Caller ID, an open-source client/server network Caller ID package
- NCID (book identifier), an identifier for books, used by CiNii, a bibliographic database maintained by the Japanese National Institute of Informatics
- National Centre for Infectious Diseases, a quarantine and management centre for contagious diseases in Singapore
- National Centre for Information Defence, United Kingdom government agency
