= British security forces =

British security forces may refer to:

- British Armed Forces, the military of the United Kingdom
- British intelligence agencies
- Law enforcement in the United Kingdom, the police and law enforcement agencies of the United Kingdom
