= Institution of Analysts and Programmers =

UK-based professional body

The Institution of Analysts & Progammers (IAP)
- Founded: 1972
- Type: Professional Body
- Purpose: Software Development
- Location: London, United Kingdom
- Origins: University Computer Association, Cambridge
- Region served: Worldwide
- Method: Membership, Industry Standards, Conferences and Publications
- Key people: Graham Fenton (President); Alastair Revell (Director General)
- Website: www.iap.org.uk

The Institution of Analysts and Programmers is a professional body and registered charity that represents those working in software development both in the United Kingdom and internationally. Founded in 1972, the institution has members spanning 30 countries.

== Overview ==
With an international membership, the IAP is a private company limited by guarantee and a registered charity in England and Wales. Its objectives are to promote the ethical development of computer systems and applications. In addition, it promotes the learning of systems development to all ages.

The IAP has its head office in Hanwell, London and its Administration Centre in Nantwich.

=== Timeline ===
- 1972: Founded as the University Computer Association
- 1981: Name Changed to The Institution of Analysts and Programmers
- 1981: The late Bob Charles is appointed as Secretary General
- 1990: Mike Ryan appointed Director General
- 1992: Institution Incorporated
- 1994: Granted Coat of Arms
- 2010: Alastair Revell appointed as Director General
- 2011: Transformation Programme Started
- 2013: The Ten E's Programme Launched
- 2016: The Institution becomes a founder member of the Cyber Security Alliance
- 2017: Adopted a new constitution
- 2018: The Institution registered as a charity in England and Wales (Charity Number 1179558)
- 2021: Founding Member of the UK Cyber Security Council
- 2022: Celebrated 50th Anniversary

== Governance ==
The IAP is governed by a Trustee Board, which comprises:

(a) up to six Elected Trustees elected at a general meeting by the membership;
(b) up to three Lay Trustees appointed from outside of the membership of the Institution by the Trustee Board;
(c) an appointed Trustee to act as Treasurer as an Ex Officio Trustee;
(d) the Director General as an Ex Officio Trustee (unless remunerated);
(e) the Chair of the council as an Ex Officio Trustee;
(f) the vice-chair of the council as an Ex Officio Trustee.

The Trustee Board elects the President and vice-president from the Elected Trustees.

The day-to-day operation of the Institution is delegated to the Director General, who appoints the executive board, which includes an Operations Director and a Director for Membership Engagement.

== Membership ==
The IAP has the following grades of membership:

- Licentiate (LIAP)
- Graduate Member (GradIAP)
- Associate Member (AMIAP)
- Member (MIAP)
- Fellow (FIAP)
- Distinguished Fellow (DFIAP)

It also has two grades that do not carry post-nominal letters: Registrant and Affiliate.

== Work ==
The Institution has been extensively involved in the formation of the UK Cyber Security Council, becoming a founding member of the Cyber Security Alliance in 2016, which successfully bid to form the Council for HM Government. The project was led by the IET, a fellow alliance partner.

In 2021, the Institution supported the inaugural Cyber OSPAs fielding Alastair Revell (its Director General) as a judge.

== Communities of Practice ==
The Institution has recently established a Community of Practice around cyber security (Cyber COP), bringing together a number of leading software developers with experience in writing secure code.

== Academic Prizes Programme ==
The Academic Prizes Programme is a venture with some universities where the IAP awards prizes to students for their software projects. The awards are given for excellence in design and development. John Thompson was an early recipient of this scheme at the University of Plymouth.

== Webinars ==
The Institution runs a series of webinars during the year, presented by members and guest speakers on a variety of IT and software releated subjects. They maintain a library of previous webinars on their YouTube channel.

Previous speakers include Paul Lynham, John Ellis, Luc Poulin, Chris Mercer, Dr Toby Mottram.

== Subsidiary ==
The Institution is the parent body of the Trustworthy Software Foundation, the successor body to the Trustworthy Software Initiative (TSI) established under the UK National Cyber Security Programme I to promote good software development practices.
