= Peter Bonfield (engineer) =

British engineer

Peter Bonfield OBE FREng
- Bonfield in 2017

Vice Chancellor of University of Westminster

Personal details
- Born: Peter William Bonfield; 1963 (age 62–63)
- Profession: University Vice Chancellor
- Scientific career
- Education: Loughborough University, University of Bath
- Awards: FREng (2012); OBE (2012)
- Fields: Materials engineering

Peter William Bonfield (born 1963) is a British materials engineer who was Vice-Chancellor and President of the University of Westminster from 2018-2026, where he served as Professor of Engineering and Sustainable Development. He became Chief Executive of British Cycling in November 2026.

Bonfield previously worked at the Building Research Establishment for more than twenty years, becoming Chief Executive from 2012 to 2018. He was President of the Institution of Engineering and Technology in 2019-2020.

== Early life ==
Bonfield studied materials science at the University of Bath. He received a master's degree in polymer science from Loughborough University, in 1985. His doctoral research, completed in 1991 at the University of Bath, concerned the fatigue evaluation of wood laminates for the design of wind-turbine blades.

== Career ==
Bonfield joined the Building Research Establishment (BRE) as a research scientist in 1992. He became Chief Executive of the BRE Group in 2012. Bonfield was seconded part-time to the Olympic Delivery Authority for the 2012 Summer Olympics, where he helped create and deliver the sustainability strategy and led work on the sustainable procurement of construction products.

BRE was examined by the Grenfell Tower Inquiry. The Phase 2 report criticised aspects of historical fire-testing and regulatory practices within the wider construction sector, including work undertaken by BRE, and identified weaknesses in testing, guidance and oversight over several decades. The report did not implicate Bonfield personally. Following publication of the report, BRE stated that it welcomed the findings and would continue to work with government on reforms to the building safety and testing regime.

Bonfield became Vice-Chancellor and President of the University of Westminster in 2018. He was made Professor of Engineering and Sustainable Development in 2025. In August 2026, it was announced that he would leave the university to join British Cycling in mid-November 2026.

=== Public appointments ===
Bonfield was a non-executive member of the board of the Department for Environment, Food and Rural Affairs from 2015 to 2018. In 2013, he led the Grown in Britain initiative and worked with industry and the government to develop a sustainable market for UK timber, published by the Forestry Commission.

He was appointed by the then Secretary of State for Environment, Food and Rural Affairs, Owen Paterson, to chair an independent review of public-sector food and catering procurement launched in July 2014. The report, A Plan for Public Procurement: Enabling a Healthy Future for Our People, Farmers and Food Producers, was published by Defra in 2014 and led to a revised Government Buying Standard for food and catering services.

Bonfield chaired Each Home Counts, an independent review of consumer advice, protection, standards and enforcement for energy efficiency and renewable energy, commissioned by the Department for Business, Energy and Industrial Strategy and Department for Communities and Local Government. The review was accompanied with 27 recommendations, including the creation of a single quality mark for retrofit installers.

Bonfield was asked by Defra to chair a roundtable on Property Flood Resilience (PFR), which were published in 2016 on Gov.uk. In 2025, the Environment Agency commissioned him to lead another independent review of progress on PFR. FloodReady: An action plan to build the resilience of people and properties set out a ten-year roadmap for mainstreaming flood-resilience measures in homes and businesses.

He served as a core member of the Independent Expert Advisory Panel established by the UK Government in the immediate aftermath of the Grenfell Tower fire to advise on building and fire safety. He also co-chaired the Engineering and Physical Sciences Research Council Tomorrow's Engineering Research Challenges report, published by UK Research and Innovation, which set out priorities for UK engineering research including inclusive engineering, net zero and digital design.

=== Professional roles ===
Bonfield was President and Chair of the Board of Trustees of the Institution of Engineering and Technology in 2019. He chaired the Board of Trustees of Institute of Occupational Safety and Health from 2021 until 2024, during which time the organisation developed its Activate 2028 strategy. He has served as Deputy Chair of London Higher, a consortium of education groups across London, since 2019. He was senior Non-Executive Director of UKActive between 2016 and 2022.

=== Cycling and sports ===
Bonfield competed in cycling as a child. He was part of the national senior road squad, and became a national juvenile circuit-race champion who represented Great Britain at the Junior World Championships in Leipzig in 1981. He later coached cyclists and triathletes, managing the British Student Sports Federation Cycling Team for the Student World Championships. He supported the British women's triathlon team with cycling technique at the 2004 Summer Olympics.

British Cycling announced his appointment as Chief Executive on 17 August 2026, with a start date in mid-November 2026. British Cycling's chair, Chris Pilling, cited Bonfield's "leadership experience, strategic vision and understanding of the opportunities facing sport and physical activity" in explaining the appointment.

== Awards and honours ==
Bonfield was appointed Officer of the Order of the British Empire in the 2012 Birthday Honours for services to research and innovation in the construction industry. In the same year, he was elected a Fellow of the Royal Academy of Engineering. He holds honorary doctorates from Edinburgh Napier University, Loughborough University and the University of Bath. In February 2026, he was awarded an Honorary Fellowship by the Institute of Chartered Foresters in recognition of his contribution to sustainable forestry and low-carbon construction.
