= Bleeding Hearts (Cameron novel) =

2001 crime novel by Australian author Lindy Cameron

- Author: Lindy Cameron
- Language: English
- Series: Kat O'Malley
- Genre: Crime novel
- Publisher: HarperCollins Australia
- Publication date: 2001
- Publication place: Australia
- Media type: Print
- Pages: 522
- Awards: 2001 Ned Kelly Award, Readers Award; 2002 Davitt Award, Readers Choice, winner
- ISBN: 0732264715
- Preceded by: Blood Guilt
- Followed by: Thicker Than Water

Bleeding Hearts is a 2001 crime novel by Australian author Lindy Cameron.

It is the second in the author's Kat O'Malley series of novels, following Blood Guilt (1999).

It was the winner of the Readers Award at the 2001 Ned Kelly Awards, and the Readers Choice Davitt Award in 2002.

== Synopsis ==
Private detective, and budding crime novelist, Kat O'Malley has been engaged by TV presenter Rebecca Jones to investigate a series of threatening letters she has been receiving. Meanwhile, a series of murders is being kept secret from the public and piles of manure are being dumped on politicians' lawns.

== Critical reception ==
Reviewing the novel for Australian Women's Book Review in 2001 Evelyn Hartogh noted that "Contemporary women's crime fiction has managed to turn the dynamic female lead character into a standard rather than a gimmick." She went on to conclude that the novel "offers positive depictions of strong women and lesbians while at the same time destabilizing the boundaries of what is seen as a 'valuable' woman. Cameron writes warmly about women who are in charge of their lives and implies clear contempt for women who trade on their looks and are dependent on men."

Graeme Blundell in The Weekend Australian was not so convinced by the novel: "Cameron, with her ex-cop turned private investigator Kit O'Malley, understands that it is not enough to substitute a feminist for a male private eye. The genre must be stripped of macho elements and reinforced by a new awareness. However, Cameron digresses too frequently into a culture that likes to show off its two-months-in-the-Pacific tan and rainbow-coloured T-shirts."

== Publication history ==
Following the novel's initial publication in 2001 by HarperCollins Australia, it was reprinted as follows:

- 2007 Bywater Books, USA
- 2014 Clan Destine Press, Australia

== Awards ==
- 2002 Davitt Award, Readers Choice, winner

== See also ==
- 2001 in Australian literature
