= Ian Bryant =

Ian Bryant may refer to:

- Ian Bryant (footballer) (born 1942), Australian rules footballer
- Ian Bryant (academic) (born 1965), British academic
