= Jeremy Blacker =

British Army general

General Sir Jeremy Blacker KCB CBE
- Born: 6 May 1939
- Died: 17 March 2005 (aged 65)
- Military career
- Allegiance: United Kingdom
- Branch: British Army
- Service years: 1959–1995
- Rank: General
- Service number: 461374
- Unit: Royal Tank Regiment
- Commands: 11th Armoured Brigade; 1st Royal Tank Regiment
- Conflicts: Operation Banner
- Awards: Knight Commander of the Order of the Bath; Commander of the Order of the British Empire

General Sir Anthony Stephen Jeremy Blacker, KCB, CBE (6 May 1939 – 17 March 2005) was a senior British Army officer who served as Master-General of the Ordnance from 1991 to 1995.

== Military career ==
Educated at Sherborne School, Corpus Christi College, Cambridge, and the Royal Military Academy Sandhurst, Blacker was commissioned into the Royal Tank Regiment in 1959. He was deployed to Northern Ireland in 1974 at the height of the Troubles.

In 1979 Blacker was appointed commanding officer of 1st Royal Tank Regiment and in 1981 he became Director of Studies at the Royal Military College of Science. In 1982 he was appointed commander of the 11th Armoured Brigade in Germany and then in 1985 he became Principal Staff Officer to the Chief of Defence Staff. In 1987 he returned to the Royal Military College of Science as commandant and in 1989 he became Assistant Chief of Defence Staff. In 1991 he was appointed Master-General of the Ordnance; in this role he managed the introduction of the AS-90 self-propelled gun. He retired in 1995.

Blacker was also Colonel Commandant of the Royal Electrical and Mechanical Engineers, of the Royal Tank Regiment and of the Royal Armoured Corps.

== Family ==
In 1973 Blacker married Julia Mary Trew and together they went on to have two daughters.

His aunt was the painter, Elva Blacker.

Military offices
Preceded by John Evans	Commandant of the Royal Military College of Science; 1987–1989	Succeeded by Samuel Cowan
Preceded by Sir John Stibbon	Master-General of the Ordnance; 1991–1995	Succeeded by Sir Robert Hayman-Joyce
