= David Jenkins (British Army officer) =

Major General David Jenkins CB CBE
- Born: David John Malcolm Jenkins; 2 January 1945 (age 81); Burton, Staffordshire, England
- Military career
- Allegiance: United Kingdom
- Branch: British Army
- Service years: 1965–2000
- Rank: Major General
- Service number: 477782
- Unit: Queen's Own Hussars
- Commands: Royal Military College of Science
- Awards: Companion of the Order of the Bath; Commander of the Order of the British Empire

Major General David John Malcolm Jenkins CB CBE (born 2 January 1945) is a retired British Army officer and a former Master-General of the Ordnance.

== Military career ==
Jenkins was commissioned into the Queen's Own Hussars in 1965.

In 1994, he became Commandant of the Royal Military College of Science. Then in 1996 he was appointed Director-General for Land Systems and in 1998 he became an Executive Director at the Defence Procurement Agency and Master-General of the Ordnance. He retired in 2000.

He was appointed colonel of the Royal Electrical and Mechanical Engineers in 1997 He was then briefly Colonel Commandant of the Royal Armoured Corps in 1999, before becoming Colonel of the Queen's Royal Hussars later in the year.

In retirement, he became Under-Treasurer at Gray's Inn.

Military offices
Preceded by Edmund Burton	Commandant of the Royal Military College of Science; 1994–1996	Succeeded by Alistair Irwin
Preceded by Sir Robert Hayman-Joyce	Master-General of the Ordnance; 1998–2000	Succeeded by Peter Gilchrist
