= Richard Vincent, Baron Vincent of Coleshill =

British Army officer (1931–2018)

Field Marshal The Right Honourable The Lord Vincent of Coleshill GBE KCB DSO
- Vincent in 2008
- Born: Richard Frederick Vincent; 23 August 1931; Uxbridge, Middlesex, England
- Died: 8 September 2018 (aged 87)
- Military career
- Allegiance: United Kingdom
- Branch: British Army
- Service years: 1951–1996
- Rank: Field Marshal
- Service number: 417555
- Unit: Royal Artillery
- Commands: Chief of the Defence Staff (1991–1992); Vice-Chief of the Defence Staff (1988–91); Royal Military College of Science (1980−1983); 19th Airportable Brigade (1975–1977); 12th Light Air Defence Regiment (1970–1972)
- Conflicts: Indonesia–Malaysia confrontation Operation Banner
- Awards: Knight Grand Cross of the Order of the British Empire; Knight Commander of the Order of the Bath; Companion of the Distinguished Service Order; Commander of the Legion of Merit (United States)
- Other work

Member of the House of Lords
- Lord Temporal
- Life peerage 3 September 1996 – 9 March 2016

Personal details
- Party: Crossbencher

Field Marshal Richard Frederick Vincent, Baron Vincent of Coleshill, GBE, KCB, DSO (23 August 1931 – 8 September 2018) was a British Army officer. After serving with British Army of the Rhine he served with the Commonwealth Brigade in Malaysia during the Indonesia–Malaysia confrontation. He commanded the 12th Light Air Defence Regiment in Northern Ireland during the Troubles, for which he was appointed a Companion of the Distinguished Service Order, and later commanded the 19th Airportable Brigade. Although he never served as one of the individual service heads, he went on to be Vice-Chief of the Defence Staff in the late 1980s and then Chief of the Defence Staff in the aftermath of the Gulf War. He subsequently became Chair of the Military Committee of NATO in the mid-1990s.

== Military career ==
Vincent was born in Uxbridge, the son of Frederick Vincent and Frances Elizabeth Vincent (née Coleshill). He was educated at Aldenham School in Hertfordshire. Vincent joined the British Army, initially in the ranks. Still, after attending Mons Officer Cadet School, he was commissioned as a National Service officer with the rank of second lieutenant in the Royal Artillery on 7 July 1951. He served with the British Army of the Rhine for the first few years, securing a short service commission in the Regular Army on 16 February 1953. Promoted to lieutenant on 13 March 1953 and to captain on 23 August 1958, he became a gunnery staff officer in 1959. He was seconded to the Radar Research Establishment in Malvern in 1960 and returned to the British Army of the Rhine as a troop commander in 1962. He attended the technical staff course at the Royal Military College of Science at Shrivenham in 1963. He attended Staff College, Camberley in 1965, following which he was promoted to major on 23 August 1965 and deployed with the Commonwealth Brigade to Malaysia during the Indonesia–Malaysia confrontation.

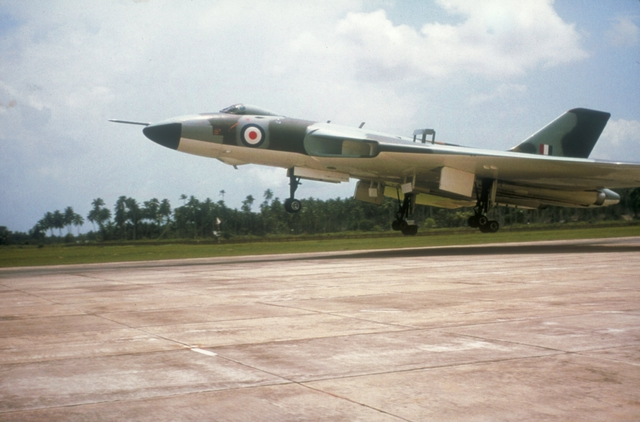
An Avro Vulcan being deployed during the Indonesia–Malaysia confrontation

Vincent was appointed to a staff officer role at Department of the Master-General of the Ordnance at the Ministry of Defence in 1968 after which he became commanding officer of the 12th Light Air Defence Regiment on 27 February 1970 with promotion to lieutenant colonel on 30 June 1970. He commanded the Regiment in Germany and in Northern Ireland during the Troubles for which he was awarded the Distinguished Service Order. He returned to Camberley as an instructor there in August 1972 and then attended the Administrative Staff College at Henley late in 1973.

Vincent obviously found his niche in the academic area of military life, as he became Military Director of Studies at the Royal Military College of Science in January 1974. Promoted to colonel on 30 June 1974 and to brigadier on 30 June 1975, he became commander of 19th Airportable Brigade in December 1975 and then attended the Royal College of Defence Studies in Belgrave Square, London in 1978. He became Deputy Military Secretary at the Ministry of Defence in January 1979 and following promotion to major general on 1 April 1980, he became Commandant of the Royal Military College of Science in July 1980. He was promoted to lieutenant general on appointment as Master-General of the Ordnance at the Ministry of Defence on 1 September 1983. He was appointed a Knight Commander of the Order of the Bath in the 1984 New Year Honours. Promoted to full general on 3 November 1986, he went on to be Vice-Chief of the Defence Staff in October 1987. He was advanced to Knight Grand Cross of the Order of the British Empire in the 1990 New Year Honours.

Vincent was promoted to field marshal and became Chief of the Defence Staff on 2 April 1991 in the aftermath of the Gulf War. His final appointment was as Chairman of the NATO Military Committee in October 1993, before retiring from the British Army in 1996. He was also Colonel Commandant of the Royal Electrical and Mechanical Engineers (REME) from 1981 until 1987, Colonel Commandant of the Royal Artillery from 1983 until 2000, Colonel Commandant of the Royal Horse Artillery from 1996 until his death in 2018 and Honorary Colonel of 100th (Yeomanry) Regiment Royal Artillery from 1982 until 1991.

== Later career ==
In retirement Vincent became Chairman of Hunting Defence Limited and a Non-Executive Director of Vickers Defence Systems Limited. He was ennobled in the 1996 Birthday Honours, being created life peer on 3 September 1996 with the title Baron Vincent of Coleshill, of Shrivenham in the County of Oxfordshire, and he held the ceremonial role of Master Gunner, St. James's Park from 1996 until 2000. He retired from the House of Lords on 9 March 2016.

Vincent was Chancellor of Cranfield University, with which the Defence College of Management and Technology had an academic partnership, from 1998 to 2010. His interests included looking after his seven grandchildren. He died on 8 September 2018.

== Personal life ==
In 1955 he married Jean Paterson Stewart (d.2019) : they went on to have two sons (one of whom died young) and a daughter.

== Arms ==
Coat of arms of Richard Vincent, Baron Vincent of Coleshill
| Crest An owl displayed Azure beaked legged and gorged with a mural crown Or. Escutcheon Gyronny Azure and Gules a four-pointed mullet gyronny Argent and Or. Supporters On either side a horse Or each with a saddlecloth Azure fimbriated Or all within a bordure Gules and girthed with a surcingle Gules fimbriated Or. |

== Sources ==
- Heathcote, Anthony (1999). The British Field Marshals; 1736–1997. Barnsley, South Yorkshire: Pen & Sword. ISBN 0-85052-696-5.

Military offices
| Preceded by Thomas Morony | Commandant of the Royal Military College of Science; 1980−1983 | Succeeded by John Stibbon |
| Preceded by Sir Peter Leng | Master-General of the Ordnance; 1983–1987 | Succeeded by Sir John Stibbon |
| Preceded by Sir Patrick Hine | Vice-Chief of the Defence Staff; 1987–1991 | Succeeded by Sir Benjamin Bathurst |
| Preceded by Sir David Craig | Chief of the Defence Staff; 1991–1992 | Succeeded by Sir Peter Harding |
| Preceded by Vigleik Eide | Chairman of the NATO Military Committee; 1993–1996 | Succeeded by Klaus Naumann |
Honorary titles
| Preceded by Sir Martin Farndale | Master Gunner, St. James's Park; 1996–2000 | Succeeded by Sir Alex Harley |
