= Trustworthy Software Foundation =

British nonprofit organiztaion

The Trustworthy Software Foundation
- Founded: 2016
- Type: Not For Profit Foundation
- Purpose: Software Development
- Location: London, United Kingdom
- Origins: Trustworthy Software Initiative (TSI)
- Region served: UK
- Method: Standards and their Verification
- Key people: Alastair Revell (Chairman)
- Website: www.tsfdn.org

The Trustworthy Software Foundation (TSFdn) is a UK not-for-profit organisation, with stated aim of improving software.

== Trustworthiness ==
The work is based around there being five facets of trustworthiness:

- Safety - The ability of the system to operate without harmful states
- Reliability - The ability of the system to deliver services as specified
- Availability - The ability of the system to deliver services when requested
- Resilience - The ability of the system to transform, renew, and recover in timely response to events
- Security - The ability of the system to remain protected against accidental or deliberate attacks

This definition of trustworthiness is an extension of a widely used definition of dependability, adding as a 5th Facet of Resilience based on the UK Government approach.

== Objectives ==
TSFdn primarily aims to provide a living backbone for signposting to diverse but often obscure sources of Good Practice, with a secondary objective to address other aspects of the 2009 Trustworthy Software Roadmap.

This focuses on engaging with partners for promulgation of Software Trustworthiness across Education, in particular through the IAP, BCS, and the IET

== Governance and Operation ==
TSFdn operates as a not-for-profit Company Limited by Guarantee, jointly owned by the subscriber organisations – UK professional bodies.

It formal interface to a cross section of stakeholders is carried out through the independent Advisory Committee on Trustworthy Systems (ACTS).

== History ==
TSFdn, alongside the Advisory Committee on Trustworthy Systems, evolved from a number of previous activities:

- A study by the Cabinet Office, Central Sponsor for Information Assurance (CSIA) in 2004-5 which identified a pervasive lack of secure software development practices as a matter for concern
- A Department of Trade and Industry (DTI – predecessor of BIS) Global Watch Report in 2006 which noted a relative lack of secure software development practices in the UK
- The Technology Strategy Board (TSB) Cyber Security Knowledge Transfer Network (CSKTN) Special Interest Group (SIG) on Secure Software Development (SSD, 2007–8)
- The TSB / Foreign and Commonwealth Office (FCO) Science and Innovation Network (SIN) Multinational Workshop “Challenges to building in … information security, privacy and assurance”, held in Paris in March 2009
- The Secure Software Development Partnership (SSDP) Study Period, funded jointly by the UK government' TSB and the Centre for the Protection of National Infrastructure (CPNI) organisations, which ran in 2009–2010
- The Trustworthy Software Initiative (TSI—originally Software Security, Dependability and Resilience Initiative—SSDRI), a UK public good activity sponsored by CPNI between 2011 and 2016
