= Edmund Burton =

British Army general

Lieutenant General Sir Edmund Burton KBE
- Born: 20 October 1943 (age 82)
- Military career
- Allegiance: United Kingdom
- Branch: British Army
- Service years: 1963–2000
- Rank: Lieutenant General
- Service number: 475110
- Unit: Royal Artillery
- Commands: 27 Regiment RA
- Awards: Knight Commander of the Order of the British Empire

Lieutenant General Sir Edmund Fortescue Gerard Burton KBE (born 20 October 1943) is a former British Army officer who served as Deputy Chief of the Defence Staff (Systems).

== Military career ==
Educated at Cheltenham College and Trinity Hall, Cambridge, Burton was commissioned into the Royal Artillery in 1963. He served as commanding officer of 27 Regiment RA before become Commander, Royal Artillery for 1st (UK) Armoured Division in 1987. He became military attaché in Washington D. C. in 1990, Commandant of the Royal Military College of Science in 1991 and Assistant Chief of the Defence Staff Operational Requirements (Land) in 1994. He went on to be Deputy Chief of the Defence Staff (Systems) in 1997 and retired in 2000.

== Later career ==
In retirement he became chairman of the former Police Information Technology Organisation, and was the Chairman of the Information Assurance Advisory Council for many years, until March 2017.

He was President of the Trustworthy Software Initiative (TSI), funded from the first UK National Cyber Security Programme (NCSP, 2011–2016), and when that funding ceased, took up the role of chair of the independent Advisory Committee on Trustworthy Systems (ACTS), until his full retirement.

Military offices
Preceded by Samuel Cowan	Commandant of the Royal Military College of Science; 1991–1994	Succeeded by David Jenkins
Preceded by Sir John Dunt	Deputy Chief of the Defence Staff (Systems); 1997−1999	Succeeded by Sir Jeremy Blackham
