= Ciaran Martin =

British cybersecurity expert (born 1974)

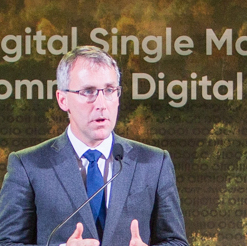
Martin in 2017

Ciaran Liam Martin, CB (born 19 September 1974), is an Irish professor and former CEO of the National Cyber Security Centre (NCSC) in the United Kingdom. In September 2020 he was appointed Professor of Practice in the Management of Public Organisations at the Blavatnik School of Government, University of Oxford.

== Life ==
Martin was appointed as head of cyber security at the Government Communications Headquarters (GCHQ) in December 2013. He recommended the establishment of a UK National Cyber Security Centre within the intelligence and security agency. This was agreed by the Government and announced by the Chancellor George Osborne in November 2015. Martin became the first Chief Executive in February 2016, and it became operational in October of that year. On 14 February 2017, the NCSC's new headquarters in Victoria in Central London were opened by Queen Elizabeth II.

Prior to joining GCHQ, Martin was Constitution Director at the Cabinet Office from 2011, helping to agree the framework for the Scottish independence referendum. From 2008 to 2011, he was Director of Security and Intelligence at the Cabinet Office. His public service career has also included a series of roles elsewhere in the Cabinet Office and in HM Treasury and the National Audit Office (NAO).

He was a member of the GCHQ Board. He is a past pupil of Christian Brothers Grammar School, Omagh, where he was very much seen as an all-rounder, being head-boy, a member of the MacRory Cup Gaelic football squad and keyboard player with indie rock outfit "Some Kind of Wonderful". He is a graduate of Hertford College, University of Oxford, where he studied history.

Martin was appointed Companion of the Order of the Bath (CB) in the 2020 New Year Honours for services to international and global cyber security.

Martin had planned on resigning in June 2020 but delayed his resignation until August because of the COVID-19 pandemic. He was succeeded by Lindy Cameron.

In December 2002, Martin was the 'phone a friend' for Declan Montague on an episode of the ITV gameshow Who Wants to Be a Millionaire?.
