= Elva Blacker =

English painter

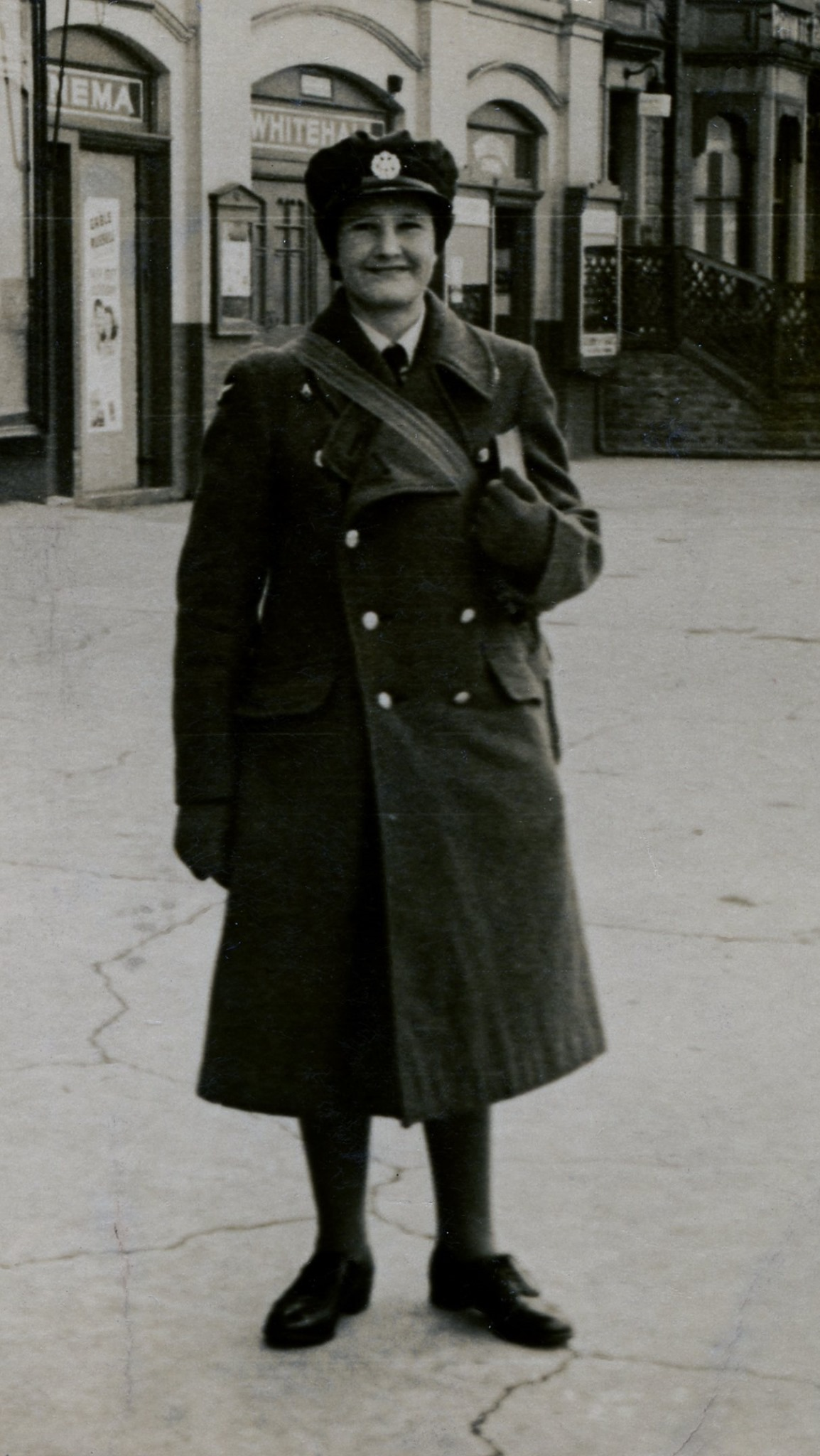
- Blacker in WAAF uniform during WWII
- Born: 1908; Carshalton
- Died: 10 April 1984; Sutton Hospital
- Education: Regent Street Polytechnic; Slade School of Fine Art
- Occupation: Painter

Elva Joan Blacker (1908 – 10 April 1984) was an English painter, known for her depictions of Royal Air Force personnel during World War II.

== Early life ==
Blacker was born at Carshalton in 1908 and raised, initially in a flat above 130 High Street, Sutton, Surrey, where her father, William Harry Blacker, worked as a photographer, with his own studio. The family later lived in a five bedroom house at Egmont Corner. Although her preference was art, she attended Regent Street Polytechnic to study photography, in accordance with his wishes. He died in 1930, and she took over the business. She continued to paint, attending Sutton and Cheam School of Art part-time, and enrolled at the Slade School of Fine Art as a full-time student in 1936. The same year she had three miniatures accepted for exhibition at the Royal Academy and six for a Society of Miniaturists exhibition. Her work was also exhibited in her first London show at a gallery on Bond Street, at the Paris Salon and at the Royal Scottish Academy. Her portrait sitters in this period included the animal rights activist Nina Douglas-Hamilton, Duchess of Hamilton, and the actress Gladys Cooper. She also photographed theatre people, to fund her time at college. One of her photographs of George Bernard Shaw forms the frontispiece in G.B.S. - A Full-length Portrait by Hesketh Pearson.

She was a life-long vegetarian. She had two brothers.

== Military career ==
From the start of World War II, Blacker was a Blood Transfusion Service driver. She was called up to the Women's Auxiliary Air Force, with the rank of as an Aircraftwoman Motor Transport Driver. After training, she was allocated to Fighter Command at RAF Biggin Hill. During periods of inaction, she would draw or paint her colleagues, usually at work or resting in informal poses. Her works in this period used mostly watercolour, but also variously involved pencil drawing, pen or brush and ink, or oil on board and canvas. The RAF Museum calls them "an unrivalled record of daily life on RAF stations". She exhibited a selection at the National Portrait Gallery in 1943, where she was photographed discussing her work with Queen Elizabeth.

In December 1944, she was attached to No. 6091 Servicing Echelon at RAF Manston, providing ground support for the Spitfires of No. 91 Squadron. The following October she moved to Headquarters No. 28 Group in London, when she chose to extended her service to begin work as an Educational and Vocational Training Instructor, helping men to return to civilian life. She was discharged on 28 May 1946, with the rank of Sergeant.

== Return to civilian life ==
Blacker moved back to the family home in Sutton, and decided to pursue painting as a career. She became acquainted with Dame Lillian Bayliss and used her contacts to paint people from the world of theatre (for example, John Reynolds Ruddock), and to recruit Graham Sutherland as President of the Sutton Arts Network, with which she was involved. She began to travel, and in 1956 spent attended a Soroptimist International conference in New York, then spent three months in the United States and Canada, earning her keep by painting portraits of people's pets. In 1957 she attended a conference on vegetarianism, in India (she had earlier attended the International Vegetarian Union's eleventh World Vegetarian Congress, at Wycliffe College, Gloucestershire, in 1947, and sketched the attendees). She then undertook a year-long tour of South-East Asia. Percy Bernard, 5th Earl of Bandon, who was Air Staff Officer, South East Asia Command, sat for a portrait that is now in the RAF Museum. In Kuala Lumpur, one of her paintings was purchased by Raja Permaisuri Agong, Tunku Puan Besar Kurshiah.

Around 1960, she returned to India to undertake further portrait commissions, including for Colonel Sir Budah Singh.

== Death and legacy ==
Blacker continued to paint until, in her sixties, failing eyesight forced her to stop. She died on 10 April 1984, at Sutton Hospital.

Her works are in a number of public collections, including over 100 in the RAF Museum, and a portrait of Alderman William Tuckett Venton, Mayor of Sutton and Cheam, owned by the London Borough of Sutton. A painting in Hereford County Hospital is also attributed to her.

Her painting Altar at St George’s Chapel, of the chapel at Biggin Hill, survived the destruction of that chapel by fire, as she had borrowed it for an exhibition. Once the rebuilt chapel, now the Biggin Hill Memorial Museum, was completed, she returned it there.

An exhibition of her work was held by the RAF Museum in 2001 and 2002, first at their RAF Cosford base, then at their museum at Hendon. In April 2017, Whitehall Historic House, a museum in Cheam, Surrey, declared her their "Object of the Month".

In September 2020, a number of works, still in the possession of her family were shown on a special edition of the BBC Television programme Antiques Roadshow, to mark the 80th anniversary of the Battle of Britain, by her great-niece.

General Sir Jeremy Blacker was her nephew.
