= UK Cyber Security Council =

Self-regulatory body

- Formation: March 2021; 5 years ago
- Founder: Department for Digital, Culture, Media and Sport
- Region served: United Kingdom
- Services: Professional Registration and Standards

The UK Cyber Security Council is the self-regulatory body for the UK cyber security profession, tasked by the UK Government with "the development of a framework that speaks across the different specialisms, setting out a comprehensive alignment of career pathways, including the certifications and qualifications required within certain levels."

== History ==
=== 2016–2021: Founding ===
In November 2016, the UK Government's National Cyber Security Strategy 2016-2021 policy paper set out "the UK Government’s plan to make Britain secure and resilient in cyberspace". It included ambitions to develop and accredit the cyber security profession by "reinforcing the recognised body of cyber security excellence within the industry and providing a focal point which can advise, shape and inform national policy."

In December 2018, the Government's Initial National Cyber Security Skills Strategy policy paper described an ambition for a new, independent body, named as the UK Cyber Security Council.

In August 2019 the Department for Digital, Culture, Media and Sport (DCMS) appointed the Institution of Engineering and Technology (IET) as the lead organisation in charge of designing and delivering the new UK Cyber Security Council, alongside 15 other cyber security professional organisations collectively known as the Cyber Security Alliance. The council will be "charged with the development of a framework that speaks across the different specialisms, setting out a comprehensive alignment of career pathways, including the certifications and qualifications required within certain levels."

In February 2021, the Department for Digital, Culture, Media and Sport confirmed in a statement that the launch of the council is scheduled for the end of March 2021.

On 31 March 2021, a press release announced that the Government-mandated Council had officially become an independent entity.

=== 2021–present ===
In 2022, the council took over running the Certified Cyber Professional scheme from the National Cyber Security Centre. The scheme was later replaced in 2023 by the council's new professional titles following a pilot period in 2022 ran with the Chartered Institute of Information Security and ISC2.

In 2024, the council announced that the National Cyber Security Centre would require accredited service providers to hold a professional title in order to provide services to government entities.

== See also ==
- National Cyber Security Centre
