= John Stibbon =

General Sir John Stibbon KCB OBE
- Born: 5 January 1935
- Died: 9 February 2014 (aged 79)
- Military career
- Allegiance: United Kingdom
- Branch: British Army
- Service years: 1954–1991
- Rank: General
- Service number: 437174
- Unit: Royal Engineers
- Commands: 20th Armoured Brigade; 28th Amphibious Engineer Regiment
- Awards: Knight Commander of the Order of the Bath; Officer of the Order of the British Empire

General Sir John James Stibbon, KCB, OBE (5 January 1935 – 9 February 2014) was a senior British Army officer who served as Master-General of the Ordnance from 1987 to 1991.

== Early life ==
Stibbon and his twin sister were born in London, England, on 5 January 1935 to Jack Stibbon, a policeman. With the outbreak of the Second World War in 1939, he was evacuated to Norfolk. He was educated at Portsmouth Southern Grammar School. At school, he was an accomplished athlete and footballer.

== Military career ==
Having completed officer training at the Royal Military Academy Sandhurst, Stibbon was commissioned into the Royal Engineers, British Army, on 6 August 1954 as a second lieutenant. He was appointed commanding officer of 28th Amphibious Engineer Regiment in 1975 and then made assistant military secretary at the Ministry of Defence in 1977. In 1979 he was made commander of 20th Armoured Brigade and in 1983 he became commandant of the Royal Military College of Science. He was promoted to assistant chief of defence staff in 1985 and to Master-General of the Ordnance in 1987; he retired in 1991. He was also Chief Royal Engineer from 1993 to 1999 and colonel commandant of the Royal Army Pay Corps (1985 to 1987) and of the Royal Pioneer Corps (1986 to 1987).

== Later life ==
In retirement, Stibbon was a non-executive director of the Chemring Group from 1993 to 2005 and chairman of ITT Defence Ltd from 1993 to 2004. He was also an honorary vice-president of the Football Association from 1987 to 1993.

Stibbon died on 9 February 2014. His funeral service was held at St Andrew's Church, Shrivenham on 25 February 2014.

Military offices
Preceded by Richard Vincent	Commandant of the Royal Military College of Science; 1983–1985	Succeeded by John Evans
Preceded by Sir Richard Vincent	Master-General of the Ordnance; 1987–1991	Succeeded by Sir Jeremy Blacker
Honorary titles
Preceded by Sir George Cooper	Chief Royal Engineer; 1993–1999	Succeeded by Sir Scott Grant
