= GovAssure =

GovAssure is a new cybersecurity regime for the UK government, starting in 2023.

== History ==
The process was announced in 2022. Compared to previous cybersecurity for UK government bodies, the main change is the adoption of the NCSC's Cyber Assessment Framework. GovAssure is expected to help organisations guard against rising Russian attacks, as well as new types of threat actors.

The first two departments to be assessed under the new scheme are the Department for Business, Energy, and Industrial Strategy and the Home Office, with C3IA assessing a selection of three systems at each.

== Processes ==
- Government departments and some other public-sector organisations, will have their cybersecurity reviewed under the GovAssure process;
- The controls are expected to be stricter than before, using the NCSC's Cyber Assessment Framework and its 14 key principles;
- The new process will be run by the Government Security Group, with advice from NCSC;
- Independent review by third parties is required.

There is also increasing emphasis on post-incident recovery as part of the security strategy.

In parallel, a Government Information Cell has been established to counter the spread of disinformation.
