= Chris Pilling =

British businessman

Christopher John Pilling (born March 1965) was the Chief Executive of the Yorkshire Building Society from 2012 to December 2016, at that time the second-largest building society in the UK.

== Early life ==
He attended the Royal Grammar School, High Wycombe from 1977 to 1983. He studied geography at Cambridge University from 1984 to 1987.

== Career ==
=== P&G ===
He joined P&G in 1987, becoming the brand manager of Daz at Gosforth.

=== British Airways ===
He joined British Airways in 1994.

=== Yorkshire Building Society ===
In January 2012 he became Chief Executive of the Yorkshire Building Society, leaving in December 2016.

== Personal life ==
He is married with two daughters

Business positions
Preceded by Iain Cornish	Chief Executive of the Yorkshire Building Society; January 2012 - 2016	Succeeded by Mike Regnier
