= Royal Military College of Science =

British postgraduate research institution

Coordinates: 51.6030°N 1.6404°W

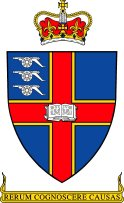
- Active: 1772–2015
- Country: United Kingdom
- Branch: British Army
- Type: Training
- Role: Teaching of military science
- Garrison/HQ: Shrivenham
- Motto(s): Rerum cognoscere causas (To know the causes of things)

The Royal Military College of Science (RMCS) was a British postgraduate school, research institution and training provider with origins dating back to 1772. It became part of the Defence Academy of the United Kingdom in 2009, and ceased to exist as an independent unit in 2015.

== History ==
=== Predecessors ===
The college traced its history back to the Military Society of Woolwich, founded by two artillery officers in 1772 'for the theoretical, practical and experimental study of gunnery'. The Society did not outlast the Napoleonic Wars; but in 1839, inspired by its example, two junior officers (Lt (later Gen Sir) J. H. Lefroy and Lt (later Maj-Gen) F. M. Eardley-Wilmot) proposed the formation of an Institute to train artillery officers along similar lines. This led to the establishment the following year of the Royal Artillery Institution "for the study of science and modern languages".

Initially the RA Institution was supported by voluntary donations, but a grant of public money in 1850 put the establishment on a firmer footing and led to the appointment of a Director of Artillery Studies to oversee ongoing training of artillery officers. In 1864, in light of fast-moving advances in technology, an Advanced Class for Artillery Officers was formed within the Institution, again at Lefroy's instigation, to provide a more rigorous, two-year course of study leading to a recognised qualification. A full-time Professor of Applied Mathematics was now appointed, as well as visiting lecturers in Chemistry, Metallurgy and Physics and Practical Mechanics, while students were also provided with professional instruction within the Royal Arsenal in the properties of guns, carriages, ammunition and small arms.

In 1885 the Department of Artillery Studies moved from the Institution into Red Barracks, Woolwich and was renamed Artillery College. At the same time its courses were made available to all officers of the Army and the Royal Marines, not just those of the Artillery. Artificer training was also offered by the college. In the early 20th century new chairs were established, alongside that of the Bashforth Professor of Mathematics and Ballistics, with the appointment of Professors of Chemistry (1900), Electricity (1903, later renamed Electrical and Mechanical Engineering) and Physics (1918). In 1889 the College further expanded and a commandant was appointed; in 1899 it was renamed Ordnance College, before reverting to its former name in 1918. Courses were suspended for the duration of the First World War.

=== Establishment ===
After World War I, the Artillery College continued to expand and took over the whole of Red Barracks; in 1927 it became the Military College of Science, reflecting its now wider remit. By 1939 there were 22 civilian academic staff and the college was more akin to a university in its operation, albeit with military instructors continuing to provide specialist teaching in the Royal Arsenal alongside the academic subjects which were taught in Red Barracks.

At the start of the Second World War the college left Woolwich, which was vulnerable to aerial bombing. It moved initially to the artillery ranges at Lydd in Kent, then dispersed to three sites: the Artillery Equipment section to Stoke-on-Trent, Fire Control Instruments to Bury, and Mechanical Traction to Rhyl. A fourth site for Tank Technology was established in 1942 at Chobham, Surrey. After the war, the college was reconstituted and reopened at Shrivenham, Berkshire, although the Rhyl section was renamed the Royal Artillery Mechanical Traction School and moved instead to Bordon, Hampshire in 1945.

=== Shrivenham ===
The Shrivenham site (then in Berkshire but since 1974 in Oxfordshire) had begun to be used for military training in the late 1930s, after the War Office purchased Beckett Hall, an 1830s country house, together with the surrounding estate. It lies between the villages of Shrivenham and Watchfield in the Vale of White Horse district of south-west Oxfordshire, close to the county border with Wiltshire.

At Shrivenham the college was organised into four faculties: Mathematics and Physics, Chemistry, Mechanical Engineering and Instrument Technology. Military instruction was, for the first time, absorbed into the academic faculties; it was overseen by three Military Directors of Studies (in Weapons, Fighting Vehicles and Fire Direction). The college was granted formal recognition by London University, enabling its students to be examined for the award of degrees. The college also provided for postgraduate studies in such specialist areas as Guided Weapons Systems and Nuclear Science and Technology, and was allowed to develop as a centre for research as well as teaching. In 1953, the college was granted its "Royal" title and became the Royal Military College of Science (RMCS).

In 1984 Cranfield University became the main academic provider of the college. A contract entered into in November 2005 extended the Cranfield relationship to 2028.

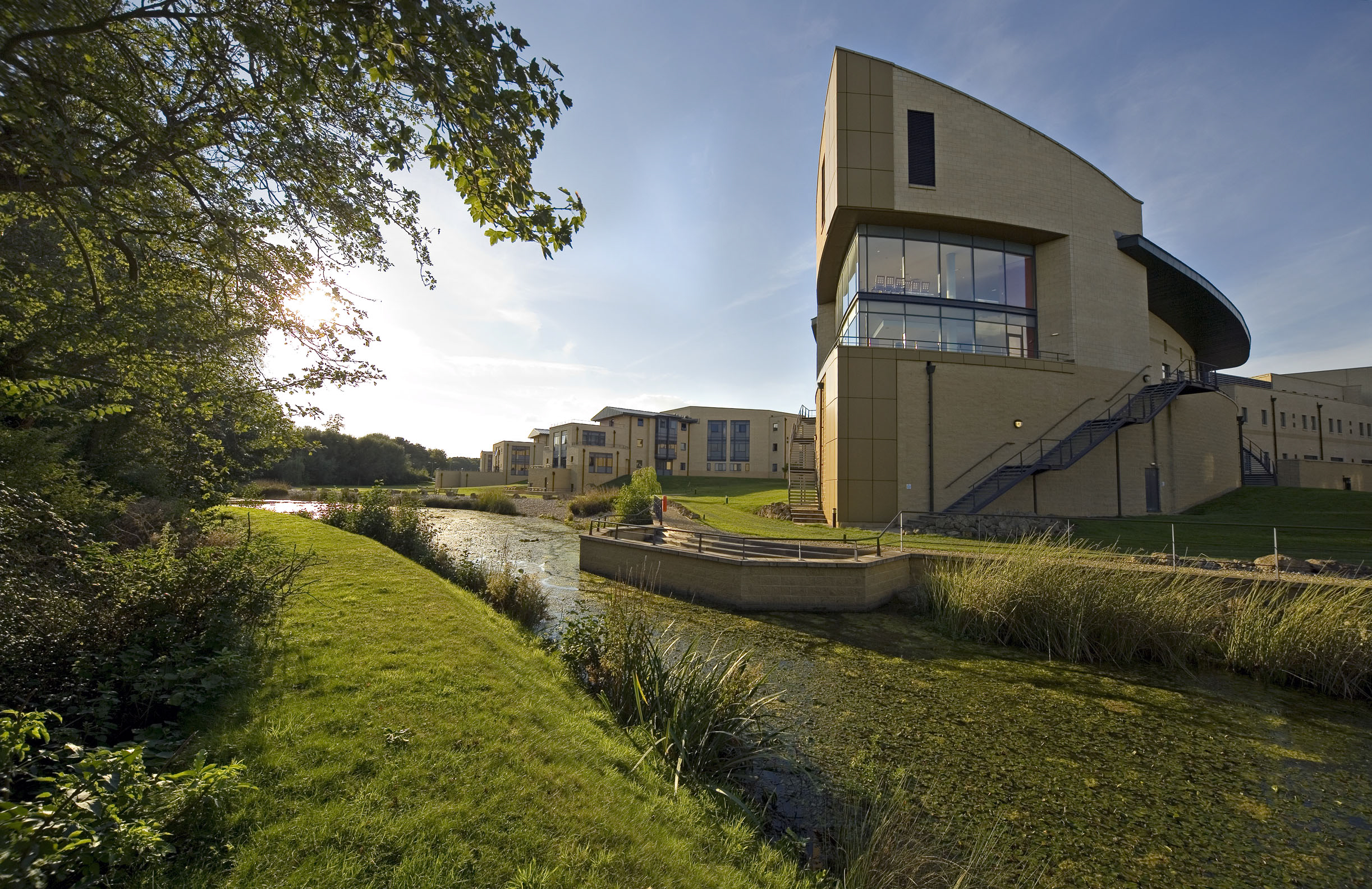
Modern Defence Academy buildings at Shrivenham, 2006

In 2004 the Royal Military College of Science amalgamated with the Defence Leadership Centre to create the Defence College of Management and Technology (DCMT). Then in 2009, DCMT became part of the Defence Academy of the United Kingdom, and was therefore renamed the Defence Academy – College of Management and Technology (DA-CMT).

DA-CMT continued to be based at Shrivenham, and there were also training centres around the country. The facilities at Shrivenham were run by Serco Defence, and the departments included: Centre for Defence Acquisition and Technology, Centre for Defence Leadership and Management, Defence Centre for Languages and Culture (formerly The Defence School of Languages), Nuclear Department and the Defence Technical Officer and Engineer Entry Scheme (DTOEES).

=== Fate ===
Since 2015 the College has ceased to exist as a distinct unit within the Defence Academy; its work is continued in several of the constituent units of the Academy, including the Technical School, Nuclear Department, Shrivenham Leadership Centre, Business Skills College and DTOEES.

== Commandants ==
Commandants of the RMCS have included:

- Major-General John D. Shapland: March 1946 – December 1948
- Major-General W. John Eldridge: December 1948 – August 1951
- Major-General Basil C. Davey: August 1951 – August 1954
- Major-General Edwyn H.W. Cobb: August 1954 – May 1955
- Major-General Charles L. Richardson: May 1955 – February 1958
- Major-General John W. Hackett: February 1958 – February 1961
- Major-General Sir Robert W. Ewbank: February 1961 – April 1964
- Major-General Edward J.H. Bates: April 1964 – May 1967
- Major-General Napier Crookenden: May 1967 – July 1969
- Major-General Frank D. King: July 1969 – October 1971
- Major-General Frank W.J. Cowtan: October 1971 – April 1975
- Major-General Marston E. Tickell: April 1975–1978
- Major-General Thomas L. Morony: September 1978 – July 1980
- Major-General Richard F. Vincent: July 1980 – April 1983
- Major-General John J. Stibbon: April 1983 – September 1985
- Major-General John A.M. Evans: September 1985 – October 1987
- Major-General A.S. Jeremy Blacker: October 1987 – March 1989
- Major-General Samuel Cowan: March 1989 – September 1991
- Major-General Edmund F.G. Burton: September 1991 – October 1994
- Major-General David J.M. Jenkins: October 1994 – December 1996
- Major-General Alistair S.H. Irwin: December 1996 – March 1999
- Major-General John C.B. Sutherell: March 1999 – April 2002
- Major-General Robert Baxter: April 2002–2005

== Notable staff ==
Notable members of staff of the College included:

- The Rev. Francis Bashforth FRS (known as the 'Father of modern gunnery'), Professor of Applied Mathematics 1864–1873
- John Percy FRS, Lecturer in Metallurgy 1864–1889
- Sir William Davidson Niven KCB, FRS, Professor of Mathematics c.1873–1874
- Sir George Greenhill FRS, Professor of Mathematics 1876–1906
- Henry Plummer FRS, FRAS, Professor of Mathematics 1921–1940
- Edward Andrade FRS, Professor of Physics 1920–28
- Sir Graham Sutton CBE, FRS, Bashforth Professor of Mathematical Physics 1947–1953

== See also ==
- Royal School of Military Survey
