= National Centre for Information Defence =

United Kingdom government agency

The National Centre for Information Defence is a division of the Government of the United Kingdom, aimed at combating misinformation attempts, including AI-generated content.

== History ==
The Prime minister of the United Kingdom, Andy Burnham announced the creation of the agency on 23 September 2026, at the United Nations General Assembly.
