= Lindy Cameron =

British civil servant and diplomat

Lindy Cameron CB OBE
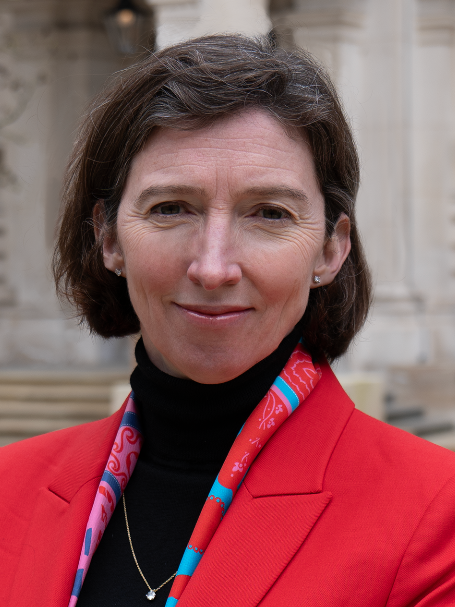
- Lindy Cameron in 2024

Permanent Secretary for Foreign, Commonwealth and Development Affairs Head of HM Diplomatic Service
- Incumbent
- Assumed office 19 October 2026
- Prime Minister: Andy Burnham
- Preceded by: Nick Dyer (acting)

British High Commissioner to India
- In office April 2024 – 19 October 2026
- Prime Minister: Rishi Sunak; Sir Keir Starmer; Andy Burnham
- Preceded by: Alex Ellis
- Succeeded by: Vacant

Chief Executive Officer of the National Cyber Security Centre
- In office 2020–2024
- Preceded by: Ciaran Martin
- Succeeded by: Richard Horne

Personal details
- Born: Belfast, Northern Ireland
- Spouse: Sean Reynolds
- Education: Balliol College, Oxford (BA); Tufts University (MA)

Lindy Cameron CB OBE is a British civil servant and diplomat, currently serving as Permanent Under-Secretary at the Foreign Office. She previously served from 2024 to 2026 as British High Commissioner to India. From 2020 to 2024, she was chief executive officer at the National Cyber Security Centre, and before that, Director-General in the Northern Ireland Office and the Department for International Development.

== Early life and education ==
Cameron was born in Belfast. Her father was a founding member of the Corrymeela Community Peace and Reconciliation Centre. She completed her undergraduate studies at the University of Oxford, where she studied modern history. She matriculated to Balliol College in 1991, before starting a course in international relations at Tufts University as a Fulbright scholar. After graduating, Cameron joined McKinsey & Company, where she worked as a management consultant until 1998.

== Research and career ==
In 1998, Cameron joined the Department for International Development (DFID). She was head of the DFID Country Offices in Iraq and Afghanistan. She was appointed an Officer of the Order of the British Empire for her services to Iraq in 2004. Cameron was seconded to the Cabinet of the United Kingdom in 2007, where she worked on Trade and Development in Africa. She moved to the Foreign Office to lead the Helmand Provincial Reconstruction Team. After completing a year-long programme at the Royal College of Defence Studies, Cameron returned to DFID in 2011, where she was appointed director of the Middle East. She spent two years in this role before being promoted to director general, overseeing a £4 billion budget. She then transferred to the Northern Ireland Office as director-general in 2019 for one year.

=== National Cyber Security Centre ===
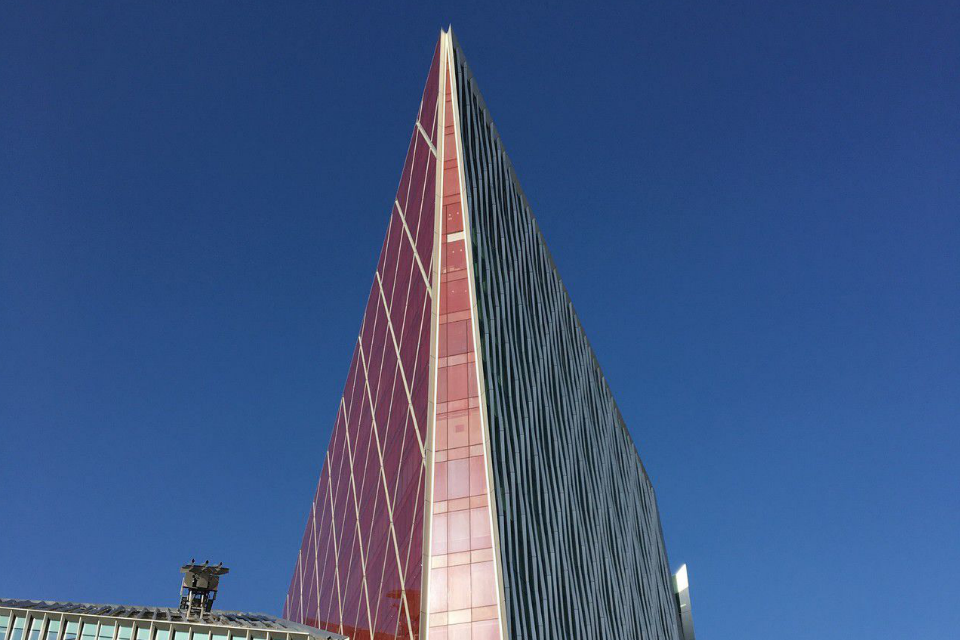
The National Cyber Security Centre in London

Cameron was appointed chief executive officer of the National Cyber Security Centre in 2020, becoming the second person to hold such a position at the NCSC. She succeeded the founding CEO, Ciaran Martin. Martin was appointed a Companion of the Order of the Bath in the 2020 Birthday Honours for his services to cyber security, and Cameron received the same honour for her services to international development.

In March 2021, during Cameron's inaugural address as CEO, she warned of the UK's need to "be clear-eyed about Chinese ambition in technological advancement," citing China's "hostile activity in cyberspace."

In June 2021, she spoke at the Royal United Services Institute. Cameron said ransomware attacks were the major threat to the United Kingdom's cybersecurity. She noted that it is possible to obtain ransomware as a service (RaaS) for either a flat fee or a share of the profits.

Cameron spoke at the 12th annual Tel Aviv Cyber Week in June 2022, identifying ransomware as the primary cyber threat to global security, which is both pervasive and quickly evolving.

=== Diplomatic appointment ===
In April 2024, it was announced that Cameron would replace Alexander Ellis as the High Commissioner from the United Kingdom to the Republic of India.

=== Permanent Under Secretary, FCDO ===
On 10 September 2026, Cameron was appointed Permanent Under-Secretary at the Foreign Office, the first woman to fill the role.
