= Institution of Engineering and Technology =

Professional engineering institution

- Founded: 2006
- Type: Professional organisation
- Purpose: Science, engineering and technology
- Location: Futures Place, Stevenage
- Origins: Institution of Electrical Engineers and Institution of Incorporated Engineers
- Region served: UK and worldwide
- Method: Industry standards, conferences, publications
- Members: 168,000 in 150 countries.
- Key people: Dawn Ohlson (president); Ed Almond, chief executive and secretary
- Website: www.theiet.org

The Institution of Engineering and Technology (IET) is a multidisciplinary professional engineering institution. The IET was formed in 2006 from two separate institutions: the Institution of Electrical Engineers (IEE), dating back to 1871, and the Institute of Incorporated Engineers (IIE), dating back to 1884. Its worldwide membership is currently in excess of over 157,000 in 148 countries. The IET's main offices are in Savoy Place in London, England, and at Futures Place in Stevenage, England.

In the United Kingdom, the IET has the authority to establish professional registration for the titles of Chartered Engineer, Incorporated Engineer, Engineering Technician, and ICT Technician, as a licensed member institution of the Engineering Council.

The IET is registered as a charity in England, Wales and Scotland.

== Formation ==
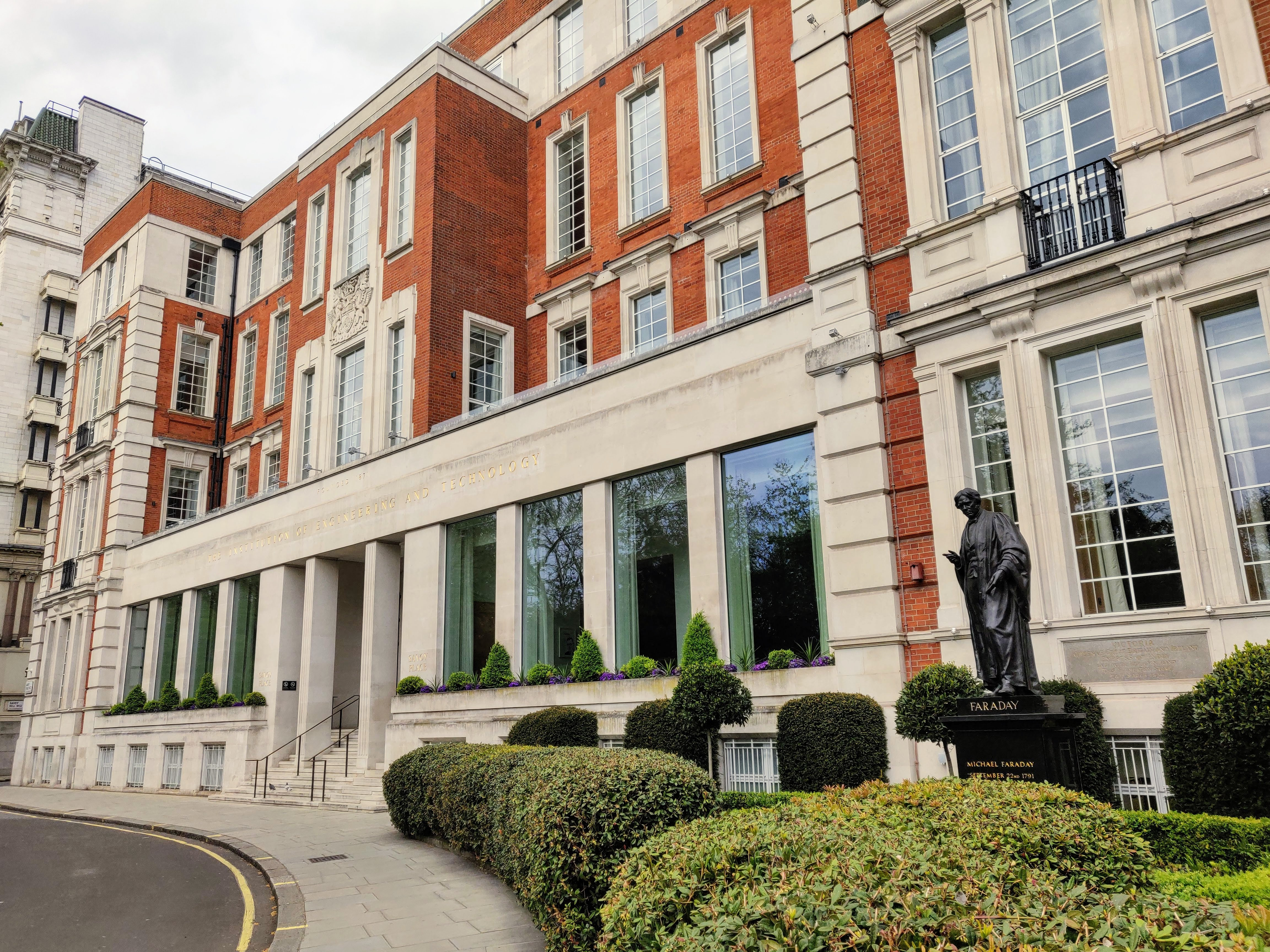
IET Savoy Place

Discussions started in 2004 between the IEE and the IIE about merging to form a new institution. In September 2005, both institutions held votes of the merger and the members voted in favour (73.5% IEE, 95.7% IIE). This merger also needed government approval, so a petition was then made to the Privy Council of the United Kingdom for a Supplemental Charter, to allow the creation of the new institution. This was approved by the Privy Council on 14 December 2005, and the new institution emerged on 31 March 2006.

The IET is the result of mergers and absorptions between over forty institutions since 1871.

== History of the IEE ==
The Society of Telegraph Engineers (STE) was formed on 17 May 1871, and it published the Journal of the Society of Telegraph Engineers from 1872 through 1880. Carl Wilhelm Siemens was first President of IEE in 1872. On 22 December 1880, the STE was renamed as the Society of Telegraph Engineers and of Electricians and, as part of this change, it renamed its journal the Journal of the Society of Telegraph Engineers and of Electricians (1881–1 82) and later the Journal of the Society of Telegraph-Engineers and Electricians (1883–1888). Following a meeting of its Council on 10 November 1887, it was decided to adopt the name of the Institution of Electrical Engineers (IEE). As part of this change, its Journal was renamed Journal of the Institution of Electrical Engineers in 1889, and it kept this title through 1963. In 1921, the Institution was Incorporated by royal charter and, following mergers with the Institution of Electronic and Radio Engineers (IERE) in 1988 and the Institution of Manufacturing Engineers (IMfgE) in 1990, it had a worldwide membership of around 120,000. The IEE represented the engineering profession, operated Professional Networks (worldwide groups of engineers sharing common technical and professional interests), had an educational role including the accreditation of degree courses and operated schemes to provide awards scholarships, grants and prizes. It was well known for publication of the IEE Wiring Regulations which now continue to be written by the IET and to be published by the British Standards Institution as BS 7671.

== History of the IIE ==
The modern Institution of Incorporated Engineers (IIE) traced its heritage to The Vulcanic Society that was founded in 1884 and became the Junior Institution of Engineers in 1902, which became the Institution of General Technician Engineers in 1970. It changed its name in 1976 to the Institution of Mechanical and General Technician Engineers. At this point it merged with the Institution of Technician Engineers in Mechanical Engineering and formed the Institution of Mechanical Incorporated Engineers (IMechIE) in 1988. The Institution of Engineers in Charge, which was founded in 1895, was merged into the Institution of Mechanical Incorporated Engineers in 1990.

The Institution of Electrical and Electronic Technician Engineers, the Society of Electronic and Radio Technicians, and the Institute of Practitioners in Radio and Electronics merged in 1990 to form the Institution of Electronics and Electrical Incorporated Engineers (IEEIE).

The IIE was formed in April 1998 by the merger of The Institution of Electronic and Electrical Incorporated Engineers (IEEIE), The Institution of Mechanical Incorporated Engineers (IMechIE), and The Institute of Engineers and Technicians (IET, not to be confused with the later-formed Institution of Engineering and Technology). In 1999 there was a further merger with The Institution of Incorporated Executive Engineers (IIExE). The IIE had a worldwide membership of approximately 40,000.

== History of the Institution of Manufacturing Engineers ==
This forerunner institution was known in all but its last year as the Institution of Production Engineers (IProdE) and was initiated by H. E. Honer. He wrote to technical periodical Engineering Production suggesting that the time was ripe to form an institution for the specialised interests of engineers engaged in manufacture/production. The resulting mass of correspondence spawned a meeting at Cannon Street Hotel on 26 February 1921. There it was decided to form the IProdE to:

- establish the status and designation of production or manufacturing engineers
- promote the science of practical production in industry
- facilitate the interchange of ideas between engineers, manufacturers and other specialists.

The term 'production engineering' came into use to describe the management of factory production techniques first developed by Henry Ford, which had expanded greatly during the First World War. The IProdE was incorporated in 1931 and was granted armorial bearings in 1937. From the outset it operated through decentralised branches called local sections wherever enough members existed. These were self-governing and elected their own officers. They held monthly meetings at which papers were read and discussed.

Outstanding papers were published in the IProdE's Journal. The work of six foremost production engineers took centre stage in certain national meetings: Viscount Nuffield, Sir Alfred Herbert, Colonel George Bray, Lord Sempill, E. H. Hancock, and J. N. Kirby. National and regional conferences were arranged dealing with specific industrial problems. Sister Councils took hold including in Australia, Canada, India, New Zealand, and South Africa.

The Institution's education committee established a graduate examination which all junior entrants undertook from 1932 onwards. An examination for Associate Membership was introduced in 1951.

The Second World War accelerated developments in production engineering and by 1945 membership of the IProdE stood at 5,000. The 1950s and 1960s were perhaps the most fruitful period for the Institution. Major conferences such as 'The Automatic Factory' in 1955 ensured that the Institution held a place at the forefront of production technology. A Royal Charter was granted in 1964 and membership stood at over 17,000 by 1969.

In 1981 the IProdE instituted four medals starting from its Diamond Jubilee: the International Award, the Mensforth Gold Medal, the Nuffield Award and the Silver Medal. The Mensforth Gold Medal was named after Sir Eric Mensforth, founder and chairman of Westland Helicopters and a former IProdE President. It was awarded to British recipients who had made an outstanding contribution to the advancement of production engineering technology. Renamed the Mensforth Manufacturing Gold Medal, it is the IET's top manufacturing award.

Financial constraints, a slowing in membership and a blurring of distinctions between the various branches of engineering led the IProdE to merger proposals in the late 1980s. The Institution of Electrical Engineers (IEE) had interests very close to those of the IProdE. The IEE was a much larger organisation than the IProdE and the proposal was that the IProdE should be represented as a specialist division within the IEE. While these talks were reaching fruition in 1991 the IProdE changed its name to the Institution of Manufacturing Engineers. A merger with the IEE took place the same year, with the IMfgE becoming the IEE's new Manufacturing Division.

== IET Presidents ==
The IET is governed by the President and Board of Trustees. The IET Council, on the other hand, serves as the advisory and consultative body, representing views of the members at large and offering advice to the Board of Trustees. Since founding the IET, several prominent engineers have served as its President and the recent Presidents are listed below:

- 2000 Professor John Edwin Midwinter
- 2001 Professor Brian Mellitt
- 2002 Professor Michael John Howard Sterling
- 2003 Sir David Brown
- 2004 Professor John O'Reilly
- 2005 Sir John Chisholm
- 2006 Sir Robin Saxby
- 2007 John Neil Loughhead
- 2008 Christopher Martin Earnshaw
- 2009 Christopher Maxwell Snowden
- 2010 Nigel John Burton
- 2011 Michael John Short
- 2012 Andrew Hopper
- 2013 Commodore Barry P S Brooks
- 2014 William Timothy Webb
- 2015 Naomi Climer
- 2016 Jeremy Daniel McK Watson
- 2017 Nicholas Paul Winser
- 2018 Michael Douglas Carr
- 2019 Peter William Bonfield
- 2020 Danielle Amanda George
- 2021 Sir Julian Young KBE CB FREng
- 2022 Professor Bob Cryan
- 2023 Dr Gopichand Katragadda
- 2024 Warren East
- 2025 Dawn Ohlson

== Purpose and function ==
The IET represents the engineering profession in matters of public concern and assists governments to make the public aware of engineering and technological issues. It provides advice on all areas of engineering, regularly advising Parliament and other agencies.

The IET Archives collect and retain material relating to the IET and its predecessor institutions as well as the history of engineering and technology. The collections cover innovation and developments in these areas from the fourteenth century to the present day, including the archive for the Women's Engineering Society (WES) .

The IET also grants Chartered Engineer, Incorporated Engineer, Engineering Technician, and ICT Technician professional designations on behalf of the Engineering Council UK. IEng is roughly equivalent to North American Professional Engineer designations and CEng is set at a higher level. Both designations have far greater geographical recognition. This is made possible through a number of networks for engineers established by the IET including the Professional Networks, worldwide groups of engineers sharing common technical and professional interests. Through the IET website, these networks provide sector-specific news, stock a library of technical articles and give members the opportunity to exchange knowledge and ideas with peer groups through discussion forums. Particular areas of focus include education, IT, energy and the environment.

The IET accredits degree courses worldwide in subjects relevant to electrical, electronic, manufacturing and information engineering. In addition, it secures funding for professional development schemes for engineering graduates including awards scholarships, grants and prizes.

In August 2019 the Department for Digital, Culture, Media and Sport (DCMS) appointed the IET as the lead organisation in charge of designing and delivering the new UK Cyber Security Council, alongside 15 other cyber security professional organisations collectively known as the Cyber Security Alliance. The council, which officially launched in April 2021, will be "charged with the development of a framework that speaks across the different specialisms, setting out a comprehensive alignment of career pathways, including the certifications and qualifications required within certain levels".

== Membership and Fellowship ==
The IET has several categories of membership, some with designatory postnominals:

- A Fellow (FIET) is a person who has demonstrated significant individual responsibility, sustained achievement and professionalism in engineering areas relevant to the interests of the Institution.
- The category of Member (MIET or TMIET) is open to professional engineers (MIET) and technicians (TMIET) with suitable qualifications and involvement in areas relevant to the interests of the Institution. MIET is a regulated professional title recognised in the European Union by Directive 2005/36. MIET is included in the list of professions regulated by professional bodies incorporated by Royal Charter under part 2 of the European Communities (Recognition of Professional Qualifications) Regulations 2007 (in the list in part 2 of schedule 1).
- The category of Associate is open to persons with an interest in areas relevant to the interests of the Institution who do not qualify for the Member category.
- The Student category is open to persons studying to become professional engineers or technicians.

== Publications ==
The IET has a journals publishing programme, totalling 24 titles such as IET Software as of March 2012 (with the addition of IET Biometrics and IET Networks). The journals contain both original and review-oriented papers relating to various disciplines in electrical, electronics, computing, control, biomedical and communications technologies.

Electronics Letters is a peer-reviewed rapid-communication journal, which publishes short original research papers every two weeks. Its scope covers developments in all electronic and electrical engineering related fields. Also available to Electronics Letters subscribers are something called the Insight Letters.

Micro & Nano Letters, first published in 2006, specialises in the rapid online publication of short research papers concentrating on advances in miniature and ultraminiature structures and systems that have at least one dimension ranging from a few tens of micrometres to a few nanometres. It offers a rapid route for international dissemination of research findings generated by researchers from the micro and nano communities.

== Awards and scholarships ==
=== Achievement Medals ===
The IET Achievement Medals are awarded to individuals who have made major and distinguished contributions in the various sectors of science, engineering and technology. The medals are named after famous engineers and persons, such as Michael Faraday, John Ambrose Fleming, J. J. Thomson, and Oliver Heaviside. The judging panel look for outstanding and sustained excellence in one or more activities. For example: research and development, innovation, design, manufacturing, technical management, and the promotion of engineering and technology.

- The Faraday Medal is the highest medal and honour of the IET. Named after Michael Faraday, the medal is awarded for notable scientific or industrial achievement in engineering or for conspicuous service rendered to the advancement of science, engineering and technology without restriction as regards nationality, country of residence or membership of the Institution. It is awarded not more frequently than once a year. The award was established in 1922 to commemorate the 50th Anniversary of the first Ordinary Meeting of the Society of Telegraph Engineers.
- The J. J. Thomson Medal for Electronics, named after J. J. Thomson, was created in 1976 by the Electronics Divisional Board of the Institution of Electrical Engineers (IEE), and is awarded to candidates who have made major and distinguished contributions in electronics.
- The Ambrose Fleming Medal for Information and Communications was first awarded in 2007 to Professor Simon Kingsley. It was named after John Ambrose Fleming, the inventor of vacuum tubes, and is awarded to candidates who have made outstanding and distinguished contributions to digital communications, telecommunications, and information engineering.
- The Mensforth Manufacturing Gold Medal is awarded to candidates who have made major and distinguished contributions to advancing the manufacturing sector. Like the Faraday Medal, the Mensforth Manufacturing Gold Medal is awarded without restriction regarding nationality, country of residence or membership of the IET.
- The Mountbatten Medal celebrates individuals who have made an outstanding contribution, over a period of time, to the promotion of electronics or information technology and their application. Contributions can be within the spheres of science, technology, industry or commerce and in the dissemination of the understanding of electronics and information technology, whether to young people, or adults. The Medal was founded by the National Electronics Council in 1992 and named after The Earl Mountbatten of Burma, the Admiral of the Fleet and Governor-General of India.

=== Other recognitions ===
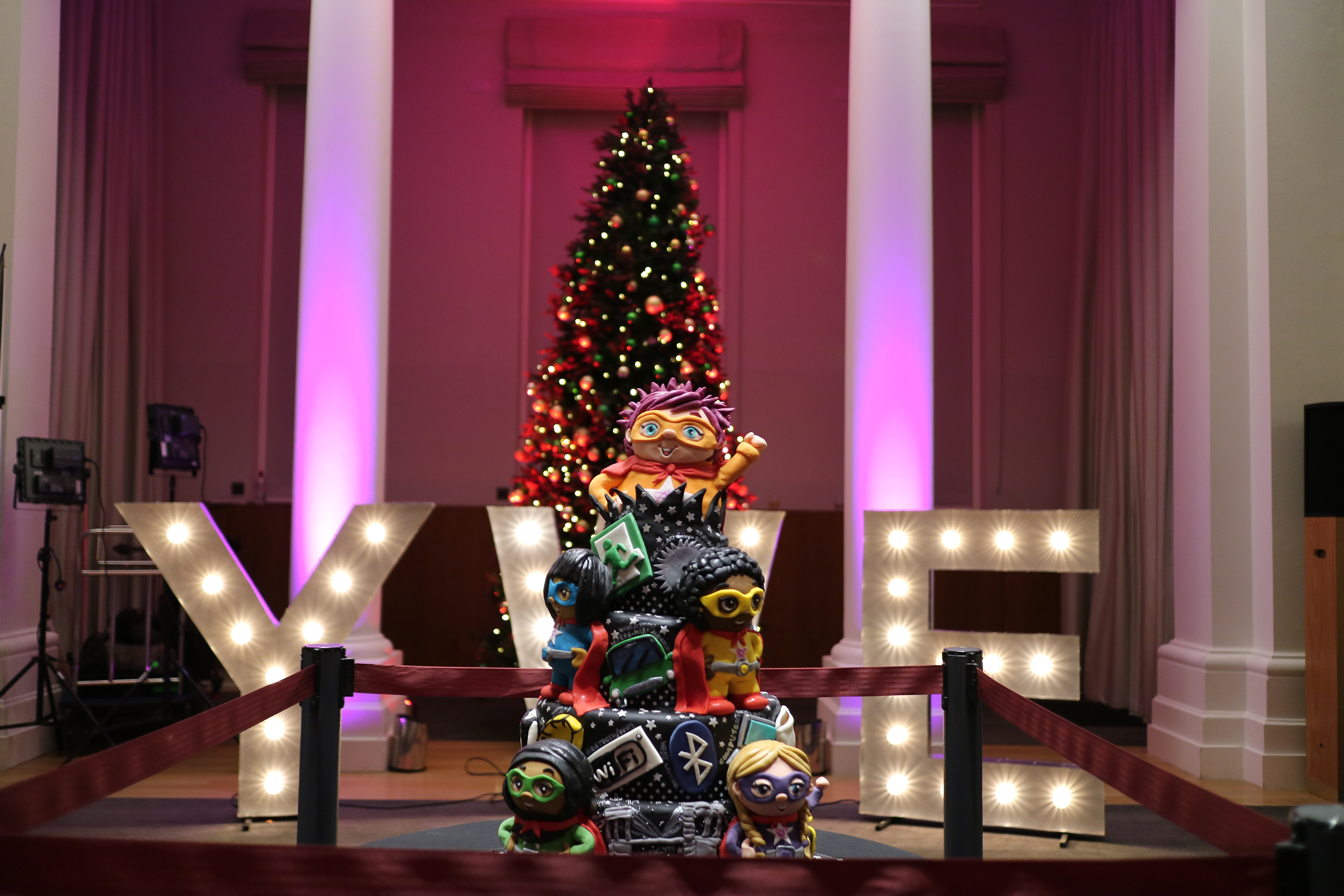
Illuminated letters and celebratory cake at the IET YWE awards ceremony, 2018

- The IET Volunteer Medal, introduced in 2015, is awarded to individuals for major and outstanding contributions voluntarily given to furthering the aims of the IET.
- The IET has awarded the Young Woman Engineer of the Year Award (YWE) since 1978 to top female engineers in the UK to recognise the contribution they make and to encourage young women and girls to consider engineering as a career. The award was created as part of an initiative to address the shortage of women in engineering roles.
- The IET Apprentice and Technician Awards, introduced in 2013, are open to all Apprentices, Technician and Armed Forces Technicians. These awards are to recognise individuals who stand out from their peers and are making achievements in their area of expertise. Individuals who are role models to others and are passionate about promoting engineering to the world.

=== Scholarships ===
The IET offer Diamond Jubilee undergraduate scholarships for first year students studying an IET accredited degree. Winners receive between £1,000 and £2,000 per year for up to four years to help with their studies. Eligibility is partially based on the exam results at the final year of school prior to university. IET also offers postgraduate scholarships intended for IET members carrying out doctoral research; the postgraduate scholarships offered by the IET assist members with awards of up to £10,000 to further research engineering related topics at universities. The IET Engineering Horizons Bursary is offered at £1,000 per year for undergraduate students on IET accredited degree courses in the UK and apprentices starting an IET Approved Apprenticeship scheme to those UK residents who have overcome personal challenges to pursue an engineering education.

== The IET outside the United Kingdom ==
The IET refers to its region-specific branches as "Local Networks".

=== Australia ===
IET Australian is the Australian Local Network of the IET (Institution of Engineering and Technology). The Australian Local Network of the IET has representation in all the states and territories of Australia. These include the state branches, their associated Younger Members Sections, and university sections in Australia. The Younger Members Sections are divided in categories based on each state, e.g. IET YMS New South Wales (IET YMS NSW).

=== Canada ===
The IET Toronto Network covers IET activities in the Southern and Western areas of Ontario and has approximately 500 members. The first Canadian Branch of the IEE (now the IET) was inaugurated by John Thompson, FIEE, and Harry Copping, FIEE, in Toronto in the early 1950s.

=== China ===
IET China office is in Beijing. It started in 2005 with core purposes of international collaboration, engineering exchange, organisation of events and seminars, and the promotion of the concept/requirements of and awarding of the title of Chartered Engineer.

=== Hong Kong ===
IET Hong Kong is the Hong Kong Local Network (formerly Branch) of the IET (Institution of Engineering and Technology). The Hong Kong Local Network of the IET has representations in the Asian region and provides a critical link into mainland China. It includes six sections, i.e. Electronics & Communications Section (ECS); Informatics and Control Technologies Section (ICTS); Management Section(MS); Power and Energy Section (PES); Manufacturing & Industrial Engineering (MIES); Railway Section( RS), as well as the Younger Members Section. It has over 5,000 members and activities are coordinated locally. It is one of the professional organisations for chartered engineers in Hong Kong.

=== Italy ===
IET Italy Local Network was established in 2007 by a group of active members led by Dr M Fiorini with the purpose to represent locally the aims and services of the IET. The vision of sharing and advancing knowledge throughout the global science, engineering and technology community to enhance people's lives is achieved building-up an open, flexible and global knowledge network supported by individuals, companies and institutions and facilitated by the IET and its members.

=== India ===
An IET India Office was established in 2006. It has nine Local Networks: Bengaluru, Chennai, Delhi, Kanyakumari, Kolkata, Mumbai, Nashik, Lucknow and Pune.

=== Kenya ===
An IET in Kenya was established on 16 November 2011. It has been enacted with powers including its awards being recognised by the Kenya National Assembly. With support of Faculty at the newly established Technical University of Kenya (formerly the Kenya Polytechnic) and Jomo Kenyatta University of Agriculture & Technology, the institution considers registration of Technologists, Technicians and Craftspeople, particularly being open to those excluded from Engineering Board of Kenya registration.

=== Kuwait ===
IET Kuwait community was established in 2013 by Dr. Abdelrahman Abdelazim. The community is very active in the region, overseeing 4 student chapters in Kuwait universities. The community's most notable event was the 2015 GCC robotics challenge, which involved collaboration with many networks in the region.

=== Malaysia ===
IET Malaysia Local Network has more than 1,900 members in Malaysia. In addition, the network has facilitated On Campuses in public and private universities. These are mentored by the Young Professional Section (YPS) of IET. As of December 2019, there are 19 active On Campuses.

== See also ==
- Engineering
- Glossary of engineering
- Engineering ethics
- Faraday Medal
- IET Achievement Medals
- Mountbatten Medal
- Society of Engineers UK
- Society of Professional Engineers UK
