= National Protective Security Authority =

United Kingdom technical authority

National Protective Security Authority (NPSA)

Agency overview
- Formed: 1999; 27 years ago (as the NISCC and NSAC)
- Preceding agencies: National Infrastructure Security Co-ordination Centre (NISCC); National Security Advice Centre (NSAC); Centre for the Protection of National Infrastructure (CPNI)
- Minister responsible: Secretary of State for the Home Department
- Agency executive: Ken McCallum, Director General of MI5
- Parent agency: Security Service (MI5)
- Website: https://www.npsa.gov.uk/

The National Protective Security Authority (NPSA) is the national technical authority in the United Kingdom for physical and personnel protective security, maintaining expertise in counter terrorism as well as state threats.

== Description ==
The National Protective Security Authority is the protective security arm of MI5, the counter-intelligence and security agency in the United Kingdom. It is a distinct entity, but benefits from access to MI5’s expertise and understanding of security threats.

NPSA helps organisations within the United Kingdom understand the range of security threats they face, for example from terrorism, espionage, and state actors, and importantly what they can do to minimise their risk through how they operate day to day. NPSA provide and develop content and guidance that is more accessible to those with no or limited security background, alongside advice for security professionals and technical experts.

NPSA work with key partners including the National Cyber Security Centre (NCSC) and the police.

== History ==
=== National Infrastructure Security Co-ordination Centre and National Security Advice Centre ===
The National Infrastructure Security Co-ordination Centre (NISCC) was an inter-departmental centre of the UK government. Set up in 1999, the role of NISCC (pronounced "nicey") was to minimise the risk to critical national infrastructure (CNI) from electronic attack. NISCC provided advice and information on computer network defence and other information assurance issues to companies operating critical national infrastructure.

The National Security Advice Centre (NSAC) was a unit within MI5 that provided security advice to other parts of the UK government.

=== Centre for the Protection of National Infrastructure ===
The Centre for the Protection of National Infrastructure (CPNI) was formed on 1 February 2007 from the merger of predecessor bodies NISCC and NSAC. CPNI provided integrated (combining information, personnel, and physical) security advice to the businesses and organisations which make up the critical national infrastructure. Through the delivery of this advice, they protect the UK national security by helping to reduce the vulnerability of the national infrastructure to terrorism and other threats.

In 2016 the cybersecurity-related aspects of the CPNI's role were taken over by the National Cyber Security Centre, itself a child agency of GCHQ.

=== National Protective Security Authority ===
On 13 March 2023, CPNI evolved into the National Protective Security Authority (NPSA), as part of Integrated Review Refresh. It absorbed the responsibilities of the Centre for the Protection of National Infrastructure and took on a broader remit beyond critical national infrastructure.

== See also ==
- British cyber security community
- British intelligence agencies
- Civil Contingencies Secretariat
- U.S. critical infrastructure protection
