= Prince Henry's Battery =

Prince Henry's Battery was an artillery battery built in Gibraltar during the Anglo-Spanish War of 1762–63, adjoining the Prince of Wales Lines. They mounted three 32-pdr guns with two more 18-pdrs, six 12-pdrs and three 4-pdrs on the Lines. After 1841, the battery was rebuilt as a retired battery as part of a mid-19th century remodelling of Gibraltar's southern defences. They were eventually built over in 1859–60 when the Prince of Wales Batteries were constructed on the same site.

== Bibliography ==
- Hughes, Quentin; Migos, Athanassios (1995). Strong as the Rock of Gibraltar. Gibraltar: Exchange Publications. OCLC 48491998.
