= Ian McIntosh (disambiguation) =

Ian McIntosh may refer to:

- Ian McIntosh (Royal Navy officer) (1919-2003), Deputy Chief of the Defence Staff (Operational Requirements)
- Ian McIntosh (footballer), (John McGregor McIntosh, 1933-2022), Scottish footballer, see List of Bury F.C. players (25–99 appearances)
- Ian McIntosh (1938-2023), Zimbabwean–South African rugby union coach
