= General Boyd =

General Boyd may refer to:

- Albert Boyd (1906–1976), U.S. Air Force major general
- Charles G. Boyd (born 1938), U.S. Air Force four-star general
- Elisha Boyd (1769–1841), Virginia Militia general
- Gerald Boyd (British Army officer) (1877–1930), British Army major general
- John Parker Boyd (1764–1830), U.S. Army brigadier general
- Robert Boyd (British Army officer) (c. 1710–1794), British Army lieutenant general

== See also ==
- Thomas Boyd-Carpenter (born 1938), British Army lieutenant general
