= Noel Thomas (British Army officer) =

General Sir Noel Thomas KCB DSO MC
- Born: 28 February 1915
- Died: 16 March 1983 (aged 68)
- Military career
- Allegiance: United Kingdom
- Branch: British Army
- Rank: General
- Service number: 65504
- Commands: 42nd (Lancashire) Division/District
- Conflicts: World War II
- Awards: Knight Commander of the Order of the Bath; Distinguished Service Order; Military Cross

General Sir John Noel Thomas KCB DSO MC (28 February 1915 – 16 March 1983) was a British Army officer who served as Master-General of the Ordnance.

== Military career ==
Thomas was commissioned into the Royal Engineers in 1936.

He served in World War II latterly as Commander Royal Engineers for the Guards Armoured Division in North West Europe.

He was appointed General Officer Commanding 42nd (Lancashire) Division/District of the Territorial Army in 1963 and then became Director of Combat Development (Army) at the Ministry of Defence in 1965. He was appointed Deputy Chief of the Defence Staff (Operational Requirements) in 1968 and Master-General of the Ordnance in 1971; in this capacity he was also a member of the Procurement Executive Organisation formed by Prime Minister Edward Heath that year. He retired in 1974.

He also served as Colonel of the Royal Pioneer Corps from 1968 to 1976.

Military offices
Preceded by George Lea	GOC 42nd (Lancashire) Division/District; 1963−1965	Succeeded by Bala Bredin
Preceded by Sir Neil Wheeler	Deputy Chief of the Defence Staff (Operational Requirements); 1968–1971	Succeeded by Sir Ian McIntosh
Preceded by Sir Charles Richardson	Master-General of the Ordnance; 1971–1974	Succeeded by Sir John Gibbon
