= Charles Jones (British Army officer) =

British Army general (1906–1988)

General Sir Charles Jones GCB CBE MC
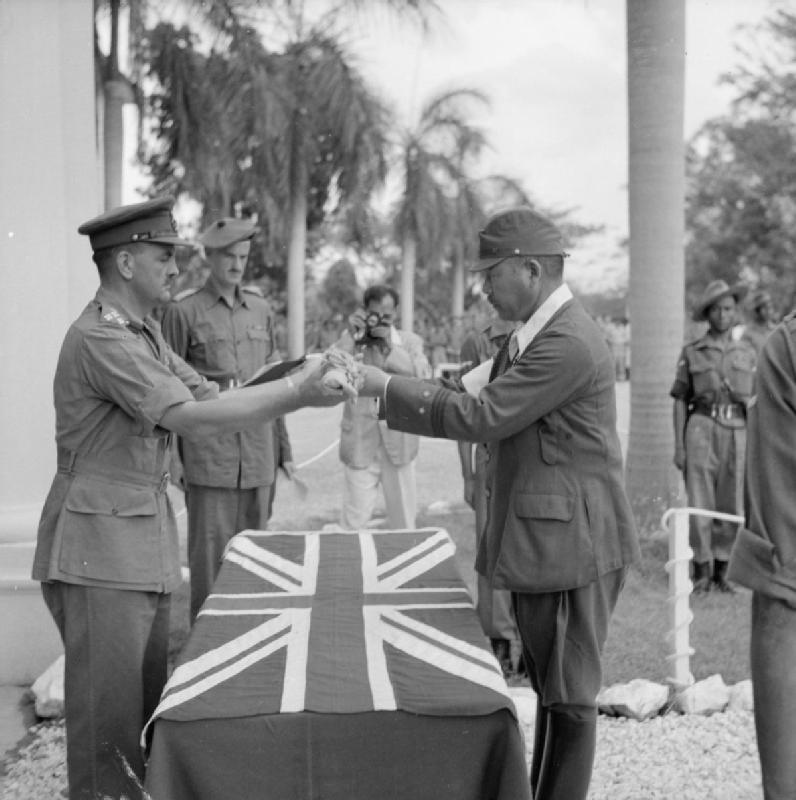
- Jones (left) accepting the surrender of General Ayabe in Kuala Lumpur, 1945.
- Born: 29 June 1906; Kenmare, County Kerry, Ireland
- Died: 4 January 1988 (aged 81); Amesbury, Salisbury, Wiltshire, England
- Relatives: General Sir Edward Jones (son)
- Military career
- Allegiance: United Kingdom
- Branch: British Army
- Service years: 1925–1967
- Rank: General
- Service number: 34845
- Unit: Royal Engineers
- Commands: Northern Command (1962–1963); I Corps (1960–1962); Staff College, Camberley (1954–1956); 7th Armoured Division (1951–1953); 2nd Infantry Brigade (1948–1950)
- Conflicts: Second World War; Palestine Emergency
- Awards: Knight Grand Cross of the Order of the Bath; Commander of the Order of the British Empire; Military Cross; Mentioned in Despatches; Order of Leopold II (Belgium); Croix de Guerre (Belgium)

General Sir Charles Phibbs Jones, GCB, CBE, MC (29 June 1906 – 4 January 1988) was a British Army officer who reached high office in the 1950s.

== Military career ==
Charles Jones was commissioned into the Royal Engineers on 3 September 1925. He saw service with the Royal Bombay Sappers and Miners in India between 1928 and 1934 and then became adjutant for the Royal Engineers Contingent within the 42nd (East Lancashire) Division in 1934.

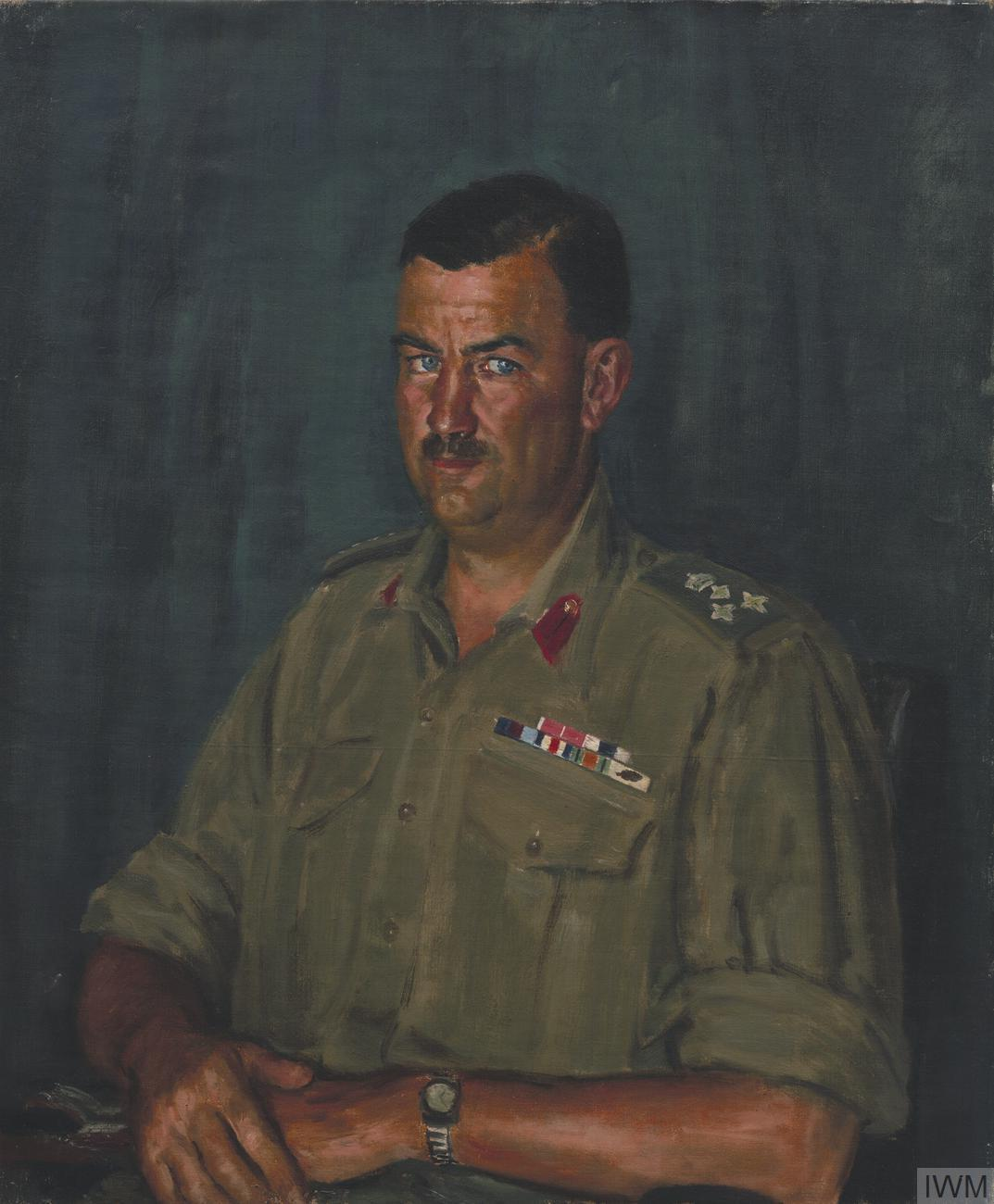
A half-length, seated portrait of Brigadier Charles Phibbs Jones, in uniform, 1945.

Jones served in the Second World War, initially as brigade major for the 127th Infantry Brigade, commanded by Brigadier John Smyth, which formed part of the British Expeditionary Force dispatched to France and Belgium in 1940. For his " gallant conduct in action with the enemy" he was awarded the Military Cross on 22 October 1940. Following this, he was an instructor at the Staff College from 1940 to 1941, when he became a general staff officer at General Headquarters Home Forces.

In 1943 he was appointed Commander Royal Engineers for the Guards Armoured Division. In October 1944 he was General Staff Officer, 1st grade (GSO1) and then brigadier on the general staff of XXX Corps in North West Europe in early 1945. He became Chief of Staff Malaya Command in 1945.

After the war, Jones was appointed brigadier on the general staff at Western Command in 1946. He then went to the Imperial Defence College in 1947 before being appointed commander 2nd Infantry Brigade in 1948. In 1950 he became director of plans at the War Office and in 1951 he went on to be general officer commanding 7th Armoured Division, part of British Army of the Rhine.

Jones was commandant at the Staff College, Camberley from 1954 to 1956 and then vice attorney general at the War Office from 1957 to 1958. He then became director of the Combined Military Planning Staff at the Central Treaty Organisation in 1959 and general officer commanding 1 British Corps in 1960. He was general officer commanding-in-chief Northern Command from 1962 to 1963, when he became Master-General of the Ordnance with the rank of full general; he retired in 1967.

Jones was also colonel commandant of the Royal Engineers from 1961 to 1972. He was Chief Royal Engineer from 1972 to 1977.

His son was General Sir Edward Jones who, like his father, became a member of the Army Board.

== Retirement ==
In retirement Jones was governor of the Royal Hospital Chelsea from 1969 to 1975, and National President of the British Legion from 1970 to 1981.

Military offices
Preceded by Robert Arkwright	GOC 7th Armoured Division; 1951–1953	Succeeded by Kenneth Cooper
Preceded by Gerald Lathbury	Commandant of the Staff College, Camberley; 1954–1956	Succeeded by Nigel Poett
Preceded by Sir Michael West	GOC 1st (British) Corps; 1960–1962	Succeeded by Sir Kenneth Darling
Preceded by Sir Michael West	GOC-in-C Northern Command; 1962–1963	Succeeded by Sir Charles Richardson
Preceded by Sir Cecil Sugden	Master-General of the Ordnance; 1963–1966	Succeeded by Sir Charles Richardson
Honorary titles
Preceded by Sir Frank Simpson	Chief Royal Engineer; 1967–1972	Succeeded by Sir Charles Richardson
Preceded by Sir Frank Simpson	Governor, Royal Hospital Chelsea; 1969–1975	Succeeded by Sir Antony Read
