= David Willison =

British Army general

Lieutenant-General Sir David Willison KCB OBE MC
- Born: 25 December 1919; Camberley, England
- Died: 24 April 2009 (aged 89)
- Military career
- Allegiance: United Kingdom
- Branch: British Army
- Service years: 1939–1975
- Rank: Lieutenant-General
- Service number: 95070
- Units: Royal Engineers, British Intelligence
- Conflicts: Second World War
- Awards: Knight Commander of the Order of the Bath; Officer of the Order of the British Empire; Military Cross

Lieutenant-General Sir David Willison, KCB, OBE, MC (25 December 1919 – 24 April 2009) was a British Army officer who served with the Royal Engineers from 1939 to 1963, after which he served in a series of military intelligence roles until his retirement from the army in 1975. Willison then became Director-General of British Intelligence until 1978.

== Family and private life ==
Willison was born in Camberley, England, on 25 December 1919. Before attending Wellington College, Willison lived in Egypt, where his father, Brigadier A. C. Willison, served. Willison was married twice: first, in 1941, to Betty Vernon Bates, with whom he had three children (a son and two daughters); after Betty's death, he married Trisha Clitherow in 1994.

== Military career ==
After Wellington College, Willison came first in the army entrance exam and attended the Royal Military Academy, Woolwich, passing out top of his year and winning the Pollock Medal for the highest academic achievement of his term. He was commissioned into the Royal Engineers in 1939, and in 1942 he was an instructor at the School of Military Engineering (specialising in bailey bridges).

Willison's first active service was briefly at Sword Beach at Ouistreham in Normandy on D-Day. He was in command of 17th Field Company, attached to the 3rd Divisional engineers and, during fighting at Bénouville on the evening of D-Day, he was seriously wounded by shrapnel and did not return to service until the following August. The wound caused pain for much of his life.

On his return to the 3rd Divisional engineers, Willison took command of 246 Field Company, near Venray in the Netherlands. In March 1945, during the advance on Bremen, his company had to reopen a mined road and a demolished bridge through flooded low-lying lands, in preparation for an assault. Working under heavy shelling, he supervised the installation of a bailey bridge and the clearance of mines and obstructions. In particular, he personally made safe a naval mine, for which he was awarded the Military Cross.

Over the following several postwar years, Willison attended the Staff College, Camberley (where he was judged to be one of the most outstanding students), served as brigade major with 1st Indian Infantry Brigade as part of the reoccupation force in Java, served as a staff officer at HQ Malaya Command, posted to the War Office in London and took command of 16 Field Company, Royal Engineers, stationed in Egypt. In 1953, he was posted to Berlin to command the Royal Engineers there. While in Berlin, Willison assisted with a clandestine Anglo-American effort to tap a major Russian military telephone cable, by constructing an underground facility (the Russians discovered the security breach a few months later).

After a spell from 1955 to 1958 as an instructor at the Staff College, Camberley, Willison was posted to Aden where he supported the Special Air Service's assistance to the Sultan of Oman in the Djebel Akhdar during a pro-Nasser rebellion. He subsequently commanded 38 Engineer Regiment from 1960. This unit was part of the Strategic reserve, with detachments in several trouble spots; this gave Willison additional international experience.

In 1963, Willison was appointed as Colonel MI4 at the War Office with assessments of Middle Eastern issues as his main concern. Key Intelligence appointments followed his acknowledged success at MI4: Brigadier Defence Intelligence in 1967, Assistant Chief of Staff (Intelligence) in Northern Army Group in 1970, Director of Service Intelligence in 1971 and finally Deputy Chief of Defence Staff (Intelligence) in 1972.

== Later career ==
Willison retired from the army in 1975, but stayed within public service. He was immediately appointed as Director-General of Intelligence (equivalent to a Deputy Under Secretary of State) until retirement in 1978. During this period, the Labour Government of the day was persuaded to increase defence spending and renew the British nuclear deterrent, against official Labour Party policy. During his period in intelligence, Willison built an international reputation for himself.

After retirement, Willison became a consultant, first to the National Westminster Bank and then to County NatWest Investment Bank, until 1991.

David Willison died on 24 April 2009.

== Assessment ==
Willison understood complex issues and expressed them in his writing and speech. During his professional courses, he achieved high marks and top rankings.

He demanded high standards of those around him and his abrupt manner made uncomfortable to subordinates and superiors alike, but he would be loyal to those who achieved such standards and supportive of those afflicted by tragedy.

== Honours ==
Apart from his MC, Willison was appointed OBE in 1958 and knighted in 1973. He assumed the honorary roles of Colonel Commandant, Royal Engineers (1973–1982) and of Chief Royal Engineer (1977–1982) and Freeman of the City of London in 1981.

Military offices
Preceded by Sir Louis Le Bailly	Deputy Chief of Defence Staff (Intelligence); 1972–1975	Succeeded by Sir Richard Wakeford
Government offices
Preceded by Sir Louis Le Bailly	Director-General Intelligence; 1975–1978	Succeeded by Sir John Aiken
Honorary titles
Preceded by Sir Charles Richardson	Chief Royal Engineer; 1977–1982	Succeeded by Sir Hugh Beach
