= Deputy Chief of the Defence Staff =

British military officer role

Deputy Chief of the Defence Staff is the title of a senior officer in the British Armed Forces who reports to the Chief of the Defence Staff and the Vice-Chief of the Defence Staff.

== Current arrangements ==
There are currently two people with the post of Deputy Chief of the Defence Staff (DCDS) at any one time. These are:

- Deputy Chief of the Defence Staff (Military Strategy and Operations)
- Deputy Chief of the Defence Staff (Force Development)

=== Deputy Chief of the Defence Staff (Military Strategy and Operations) ===
In 1989–91, the Defence Operations Executive, led by the Deputy Chief of the Defence Staff (Commitments) and including the Assistant Chiefs of the Naval, General, and Air Staffs, supervised the Joint Operations Centre which in turn passed orders to the forces in Cyprus, Belize, the Falklands, and Hong Kong. These commands consisted of units of all three services and were commanded by one or 2-star rank flag officers. Commander British Forces (CBF) British Forces Cyprus was a rotational post between the Army and RAF, at two-star level; CBF British Forces Belize was an Army brigadier; CBF Falklands was a rotational post between all three services at two-star level; and CBF Hong Kong was an Army major general.

These were:
Deputy Chief of the Defence Staff (Commitments)

- 1985–1987 Vice-Admiral Sir John Woodward
- 1987–1989 Lieutenant-General Sir Antony Walker
- 1989–1992 Air Marshal Sir Kenneth Hayr
- 1992–1995 Vice-Admiral the Hon. Sir Nicholas Hill-Norton
- 1995–1997 Lieutenant-General Sir Alexander Harley
- 1997–2000 Air Marshal Sir John Day
- 2000–2003 Lieutenant-General Sir Anthony Pigott
- 2003–2006 Lieutenant-General Sir Robert Fry
- 2006–2007 Vice-Admiral Charles Style
- 2007–2009 Lieutenant-General Sir Peter Wall

Current title: Deputy Chief of Defence Staff (Military Strategy & Operations)

- 2009–2011 Lieutenant-General Simon Mayall
- 2011–2013 Lieutenant-General Richard Barrons
- 2013–2014 Lieutenant-General James Everard
- 2014–2016 Lieutenant-General Gordon Messenger
- 2016–2018 Lieutenant-General Mark Carleton-Smith
- 2018–2021 Lieutenant General Douglas Chalmers
- 2021–2024 Lieutenant General Sir Roland Walker
- 2024 – 2025 Air Marshal Harv Smyth
- 2025 – present Lieutenant General Sir Charles Collins

=== Deputy Chief of the Defence Staff (Force Development) ===
These were:
Deputy Chief of the Defence Staff (Operational Requirements)

- 1967–1968 Air Marshal Sir Neil Wheeler
- 1968–1971 Lieutenant-General Sir Noel Thomas
- 1971–1973 Vice-Admiral Sir Ian McIntosh
- 1973–1976 Air Marshal Sir Michael Giddings
- 1976–1978 Lieutenant-General Sir Hugh Cunningham
- 1978–1981 Vice-Admiral Sir Stephen Berthon
- 1981–1983 Lieutenant-General Sir Maurice Johnston

Deputy Chief of the Defence Staff (Systems)

- 1983–1986 Air Marshal Sir Donald Hall
- 1986–1989 Vice-Admiral Sir Jeremy Black
- 1989–1992 Lieutenant-General Sir Anthony Mullens
- 1992–1994 Air Marshal Sir Roger Austin

Deputy Chief of the Defence Staff (Equipment Capability)

- 1994–1995 Vice-Admiral Malcolm Rutherford

Deputy Chief of the Defence Staff (Systems)

- 1995–1997 Vice-Admiral Sir John Dunt
- 1997–1999 Lieutenant-General Sir Edmund Burton

Deputy Chief of the Defence Staff (Equipment Capability)

- 1999–2002 Vice-Admiral Sir Jeremy Blackham
- 2002–2003 Air Marshal Sir Jock Stirrup
- 2003–2006 Lieutenant-General Sir Robert Fulton
- 2006–2009 Lieutenant-General Andrew Figgures
- 2009–2012 Vice-Admiral Sir Paul Lambert

Deputy Chief of the Defence Staff (Military Capability)

- 2012–2016 Air Marshal Sir Stephen Hillier
- 2016–2018 Lieutenant General Mark Poffley
- 2018–2022 Air Marshal Rich Knighton
- 2022–2025 Lieutenant General Sir Robert Magowan

Current title:Deputy Chief of the Defence Staff (Force Development)

- 2025 Lieutenant General Sir Robert Magowan
- 2025 – present Air Marshal Tim Jones

== Discontinued arrangements ==
=== Early Deputy Chiefs of the Defence Staff ===
These were:

- 1957–1960 Lieutenant-General Sir Roderick McLeod
- 1960–1962 Air Marshal Sir Alfred Earle
- 1962–1964 Lieutenant-General Sir Denis O'Connor

Note: This single "Deputy Chief" role was redesignated Vice-Chief of the Defence Staff after 1964.

=== Deputy Chiefs of the Defence Staff (Personnel and Training) / Deputy Chiefs of the Defence Staff (People) / Chief of Defence People ===
These were:
Deputy Chief of the Defence Staff (Programmes and Personnel)

- 1984–1987 Lieutenant-General Sir John Chapple
- 1987–1989 Air Marshal Sir David Parry-Evans
- 1989–1992 Vice-Admiral Sir Barry Wilson
- 1992–1996 Lieutenant-General the Hon. Sir Thomas Boyd-Carpenter
- 1996–1999 Air Marshal Sir Peter Squire

Deputy Chief of the Defence Staff (Personnel)

- 1999–2002 Air Marshal Sir Malcolm Pledger
- 2002–2005 Lieutenant-General Anthony Palmer
- 2005–2007 Air Marshal David Pocock
- 2007–2010 Vice-Admiral Peter Wilkinson

Deputy Chief of the Defence Staff (Personnel and Training)

- 2010–2013 Lieutenant-General Sir William Rollo

The post was then re-designated as the Chief of Defence Personnel and later renamed as the Chief of Defence People.

=== Deputy Chiefs of the Defence Staff (Intelligence) ===
- 1964–1965 Vice-Admiral Sir Norman Denning
- 1965–1968 Air Marshal Sir Harold Maguire
- 1968–1971 Lieutenant-General Sir Richard Fyffe
- 1971–1972 Vice-Admiral Sir Louis Le Bailly
- 1972–1975 Lieutenant-General Sir David Willison
- 1975–1978 Air Marshal Sir Richard Wakeford
- 1978–1981 Vice-Admiral Sir Roy Halliday
- 1981–1983 Lieutenant-General Sir James Glover
- 1983–1984 Air Marshal Sir Michael Armitage

(post discontinued in 1984; taken over by Chief of Defence Intelligence)
