= Michael Giddings =

Royal Air Force air marshal

Sir Michael Giddings
- Born: 27 August 1920; Walthamstow, London, England
- Died: 5 April 2009 (aged 88)
- Military career
- Allegiance: United Kingdom
- Branch: Royal Air Force
- Service years: 1940–1976
- Rank: Air Marshal
- Service number: 113414
- Commands: Central Reconnaissance Establishment (1967–68); No. 57 Squadron (1957–60); No. 129 Squadron (1945–46)
- Conflicts: Second World War: Siege of Malta
- Awards: Knight Commander of the Order of the Bath; Officer of the Order of the British Empire; Distinguished Flying Cross; Air Force Cross & Bar
- Other work: Independent panel inspector with the Department of Environment

Air Marshal Sir Kenneth Charles Michael Giddings, KCB, OBE, DFC, AFC & Bar (27 August 1920 – 5 April 2009) was a senior Royal Air Force officer who served as a fighter pilot during the Second World War. After retiring from the military, he became an independent panel inspector with the Department of Environment and chaired a number of inquiries concerning motorway expansion.

== Early life ==
Giddings was born 27 August 1920 in Walthamstow, London, England. He was educated at Ealing Grammar School.

== RAF career ==
=== Second World War ===
Giddings was conscripted into the Royal Air Force Volunteer Reserve in 1940. On 1 November 1941, he became a Sergeant in the RAFVR. He completed his pilot training in the United States of America. Upon returning to Britain, he joined No. 122 Squadron RAF, based at RAF Turnhouse, and flew Spitfires. With the squadron he flew patrols over the Firth of Forth. He moved with them when they were reposted to RAF Hornchurch in the south of England. He then flew sorties over northern France.

In July 1942, Giddings flew from the aircraft carrier HMS Eagle, situated in the Mediterranean, to Malta. In August he joined No. 246 Squadron RAF and provided air support for the convoys involved in Operation Pedestal. On 1 October 1942, he was regraded to the rank of Pilot Officer on probation. During that month he flew as many as four sorties a day, and shot down at least two enemy aircraft, including an Italian Macchi C.202, and damaged numerous others. He was involved in the defence of the island from the Axis powers until November 1942, when he was injured during an accident. He was taking off when a truck appeared on the runway in front of him. He crashed into it at high speed and broke a wrist and an arm. He then returned to England to recuperate. On 1 November 1943 he was promoted to Flight Lieutenant, and on 1 September 1945 this was made permanent. He later was given seniority from 1 September 1945.

During the summer of 1944, he was made a flight commander in No. 118 Squadron RAF. With them he flew the Spitfire IX. With the squadron he took part in the Battle of Arnhem, and shared the destruction of a Messerschmitt Bf 109. In February 1945, Giddings was awarded the Distinguished Flying Cross. The citation published in the London Gazette on 9 February 1945, reading:

Flight Lieutenant Kenneth Charles Michael GIDDINGS (113414), R.A.F.V.R., 118 Sqn.
Flight Lieutenant Giddings has completed a very large number of varied sorties. He has led his flight and, on occasions, the squadron with great skill and determination, factors which have contributed in good measure to the successes obtained. In air fighting Flight Lieutenant Giddings has destroyed four and damaged several more enemy aircraft.

In April 1945, he became the commanding officer of No. 129 Squadron RAF.

=== Post-war and senior command ===
In 1946 Giddings attended the Empire Test Pilots' School at RAF Cranfield in Bedfordshire. Upon graduating he was sent to the Royal Aircraft Establishment, Farnborough, to test new jet fighters for three years. He was promoted to squadron leader on 1 January 1950, and awarded the Air Force Cross (AFC) in June. He then spent five years as a Staff Officer at RAF Fighter Command, during which he was appointed an Officer of the Order of the British Empire in the 1952 Birthday Honours. He was then appointed as commanding officer of a wing based at RAF Waterbeach. He held this position from 1954 to 1956. He was promoted to wing commander on 1 January 1956, as part of the new-year promotions, and was awarded a Bar to his AFC the following day. His next appointment was to Central Fighter Establishment and he commanded their tactics wing. His next flying role was as Commanding Officer of No. 57 Squadron RAF that flew the Handley Page Victor. On 1 July 1960, Giddings was promoted to the rank of group captain, and served on the operational staff of Bomber Command.

Giddings was promoted to air commodore on 1 January 1965. He was appointed Air Officer Commanding Central Reconnaissance Establishment in 1967, and held the post for one year. On 1 January 1969, he was promoted to air vice marshal. He took another staff appointment as Assistant Chief of the Air Staff (Operational Requirements), in 1969. During this post he was involved in international talks about a Multi-Role Combat Aircraft, which would become the Panavia Tornado. From 1971 to 1973, he was Chief of Staff of No. 18 Group RAF. He was promoted to air marshal on 1 January 1974, and knighted as a Knight Commander of the Order of the Bath in the 1975 New Year Honours. His final appointment was as Deputy Chief of the Defence Staff (Operational Requirements). He retired from the RAF on 19 June 1976.

== Later life and death ==
Giddings was an independent panel inspector with the Department of Environment between 1979 and 1991. During this time he presided over many inquiries concerning motorway expansion. He presided over the year-long inquiry in May 1982 concerning the extension of the M1 motorway to link with the A1(M). At the time it was the longest inquiry ever held. He also chaired the inquiry concerning the Archway Road A1 extension in North London. The expansion would have led to the demolition of almost 200 houses and was strongly opposed. During this inquiry he and his family received a number of threats and an attack on their home. This led to Gidding's resignation from the department in 1991.

Giddings died on 5 April 2009.

== Personal life ==
In 1946 he married Elizabeth McConnell, who survived him. They had four children; two sons, and two daughters.

Giddings was an accomplished pianist. He wrote a number of music scores for television programmes, including the opening theme tune for the television drama Cathy Come Home.

Military offices
| Preceded by Sir Ian McIntosh | Deputy Chief of the Defence Staff (Operational Requirements); 1973–1976 | Succeeded by Sir Hugh Cunningham |
