= David Belchem =

British army officer (1911–1981)

Major-General David Belchem CB CBE DSO
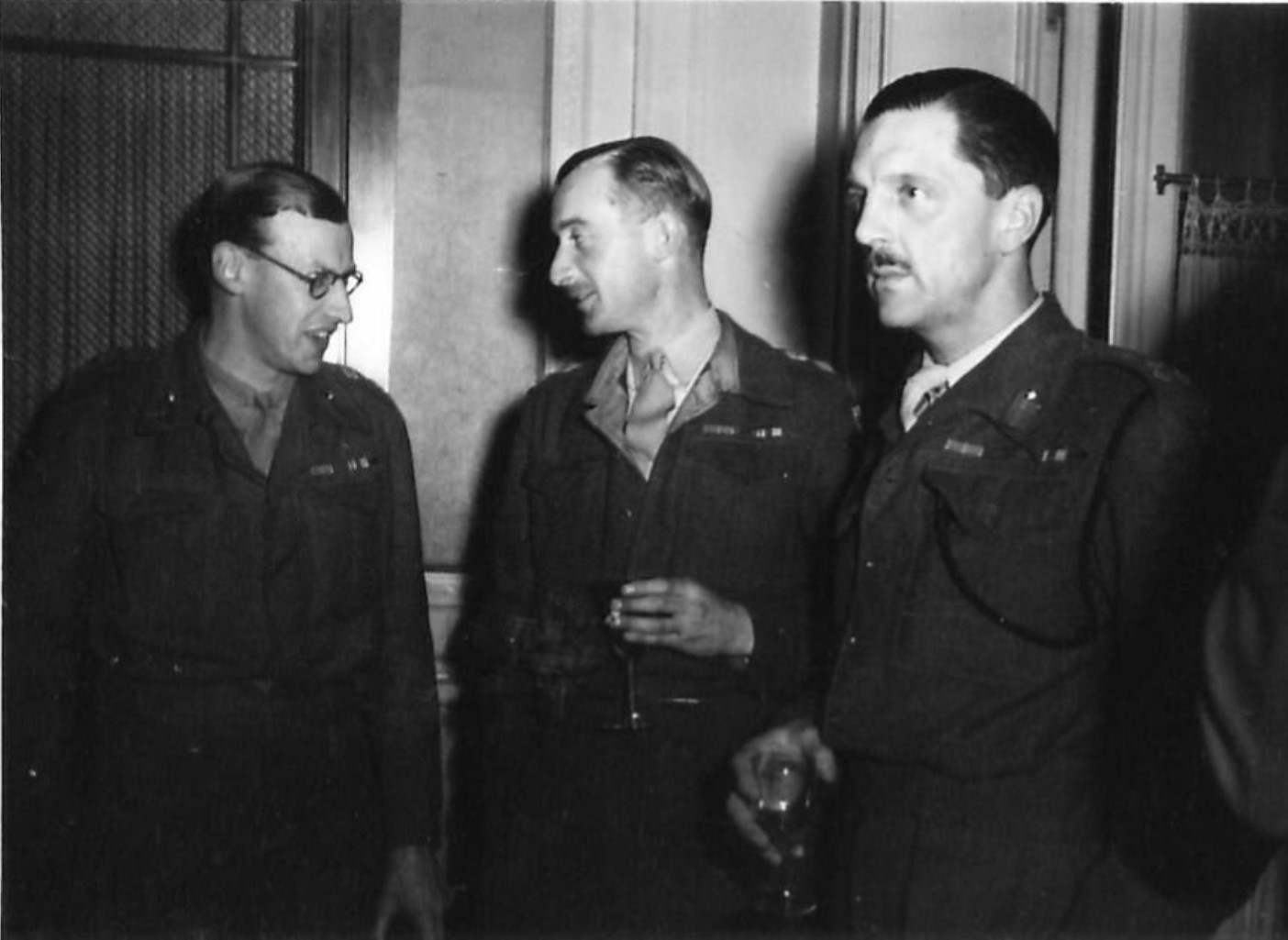
- (From left to right) Brigadier E. T. Williams, Lieutenant-Colonel L. M. Murphy and Brigadier R. F. K. Belchem at the second anniversary of the Battle of El Alamein dinner, 26 October 1944
- Born: Ronald Frederick King Belchem; 21 January 1911; Gibraltar
- Died: 19 July 1981 (aged 70)
- Military career
- Allegiance: United Kingdom
- Branch: British Army
- Service years: 1931–1953
- Rank: Major-General
- Service number: 49798
- Unit: Royal Armoured Corps
- Conflicts: List: Second World War; Battle of Greece; Western Desert campaign; Operation Crusader; Battle of Gazala; Battle of Alam el Halfa; Battle of El Alamein; Tunisian campaign; Allied invasion of Sicily; Allied invasion of Italy; Operation Overlord; Western Allied invasion of Germany
- Awards: List: Companion of the Order of the Bath; Commander of the Order of the British Empire; Distinguished Service Order; Mentioned in dispatches (5); Knight Commander of the Order of Orange-Nassau with Swords (Netherlands); Commander of the Order of the White Lion (Czechoslovakia); Officer of the Legion of Merit (US)

Ronald Frederick King "David" Belchem CB CBE DSO (21 January 1911 – 19 July 1981) was a senior British Army officer who saw service in the Second World War.

A graduate of the Royal Military College, Sandhurst, where he was awarded the Anson Memorial Sword for passing out first and the King's Medal for the cadet best qualified in military subjects, Belchem was commissioned as a second lieutenant in the Royal Tank Regiment in 1931. Fluent in French, Russian and Italian, he qualified as an Army interpreter in Russian and Italian, and served on exchange with an Italian armoured unit. He commanded a detachment of six Vickers Mark III light tanks, in Mandatory Palestine, for which he was mentioned in despatches. He passed the entrance examinations and was accepted into the Staff College, Camberley, but due to the outbreak of the Second World War he attended a truncated course at the new staff college in Haifa instead.

In February 1941, he became the General Staff Officer Grade 2 (GSO2) in the headquarters (HQ) of W Force, an expeditionary force being sent to Greece. He participated in the Battle of Greece, and the chaotic evacuation. In December 1941 he became the General Staff Officer Grade 1 (GSO1) (Staff Duties) of the newly formed Eighth Army. He participated in the Western Desert campaign, and in January 1943, was appointed to command the 1st Royal Tank Regiment, which he led in the Tunisian campaign, earning an immediate award of the Distinguished Service Order. He returned to the staff of the Eighth Army as its GSO1 (Operations) until the end of the Sicilian operation, when he became the Brigadier General Staff (BGS) (Operations and Plans). In January 1944 he joined the staff of the 21st Army Group as the BGS (Operations). He was considered the deputy chief of staff, and acted as chief of staff for a month in 1945.

After the war, Belchem commanded the 6th (Highland) Infantry Brigade and later the 33rd Armoured Brigade in Germany. Between these appointments, he served as chief of staff to Field Marshal Lord Montgomery in his role as chairman of the Committee for Western Union Defence Organisation.

== Early life ==
Ronald Frederick King Belchem was born in Gibraltar on 21 January 1911, where his father, O. K. Belchem, a British Army officer, was stationed at the time. His mother, Louise née Morris, was the daughter of an Army medical officer. His father was wounded in the Great War, and four of his uncles were killed. He had a Russian nanny, and attended a French lycée and an Italian school in Florence, becoming fluent in Russian, French and Italian. He was interested in automotive engineering, and took evening classes in the subject. He graduated from the Royal Grammar School, Guildford, where he served in the school Officers' Training Corps, becoming a company sergeant major.

In August 1929 Belchem entered the Royal Military College, Sandhurst, having passed the entrance examination ranked. David Niven was the under officer in charge of the junior term cadets in his company. Belchem participated in boxing as a middleweight, and he earned the nickname "David" after he defeated a much larger opponent in a bout. Each cadet could choose an optional subject to study, and he chose mechanical science, as he set his sights on joining the Royal Tank Regiment (RTR). He considered that tanks would become more important in the future, and the likely consequent expansion of the RTR would offer good prospects for advancement in a post-war army in which promotion was slow. He also knew from his father that the RTR encouraged officers to attend various military schools, which was not the case in some infantry regiments. During the summer holiday, he worked as a garage mechanic.

In his third term at Sandhurst Belchem was an under officer, in charge of a platoon of fifty of his colleagues. Each cadet made three selections of regiments that he wished to join, and was then interviewed by officers from those regiments to assess his suitability. The RTR was a popular choice, and it required officers to be one of the top ten graduates, and to have an allowance from their family of £150 (equivalent to £8,000 in 2025) per annum. He came first in the passing out examination, for which he was awarded the Anson Memorial Sword, and he received the King's Medal for the cadet best qualified in military subjects. In addition, he was awarded a prize of £50 (equivalent to £3,000 in 2025) per annum for five years and several hundred pounds in prizes for various subjects.

== Between the wars ==
Belchem was commissioned as a second lieutenant in the RTR on 29 January 1931 and reported for duty at the RTR depot at Bovington Camp on 1 March 1931, along with six of his colleagues, including Alan Jolly. Over the next three months they studied automotive engineering and learned to drive a variety of army vehicles. They then spent three months on tank gunnery at the Lulworth Ranges and some time as apprentices at the Tank Repair and Overhaul Workshops. He joined the 3rd Royal Tank Regiment at Lydd on 11 April 1932. He was promoted to lieutenant on 29 January 1934.

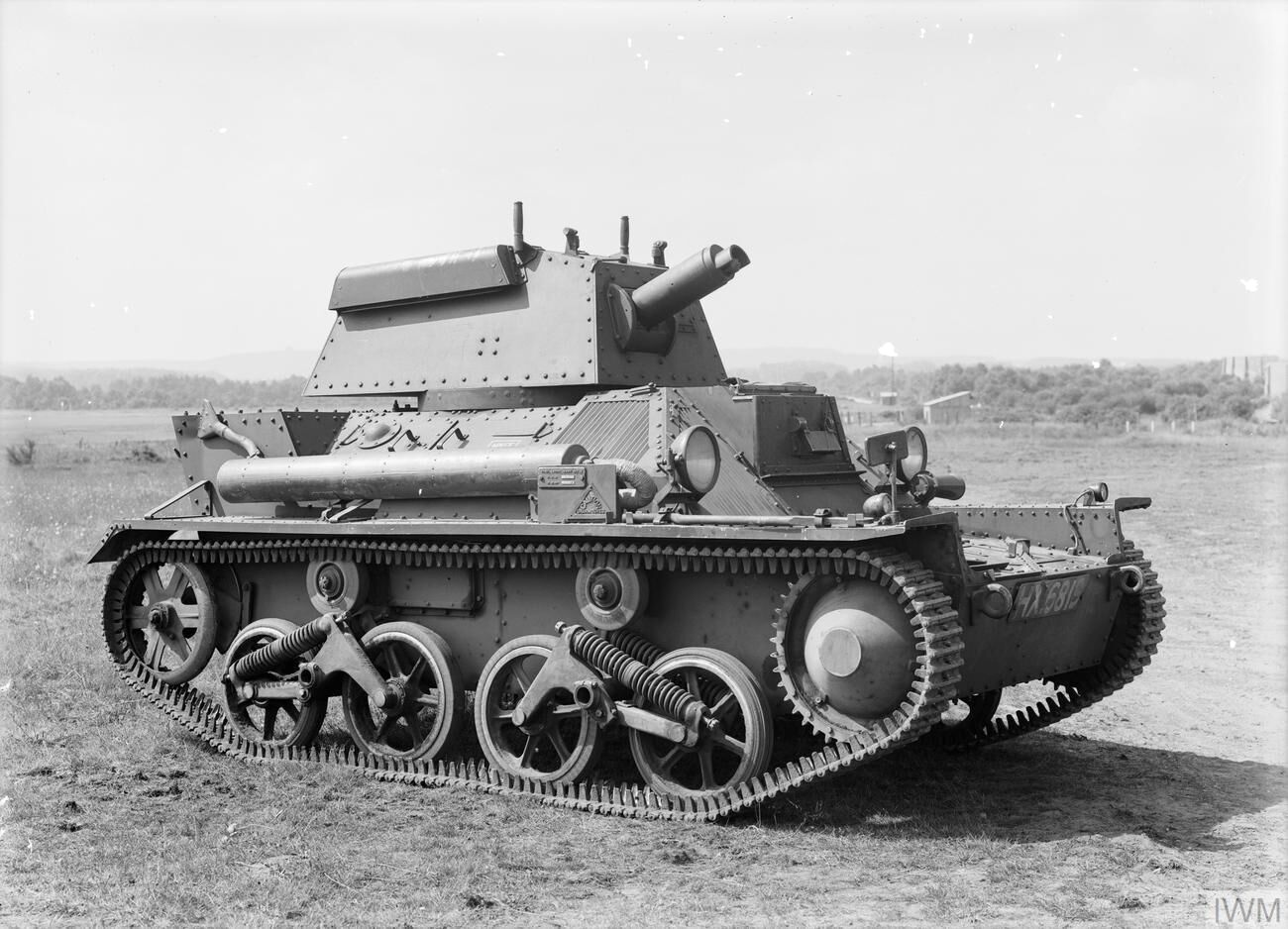
A Vickers Mark III light tank

The next step in an officer's career with the British Army was to pass the examination for promotion to captain. Belchem hoped to then go on to staff college. A "distinguished" mark in the promotion examination was worth additional points on the staff college entrance examination. Additional points could be obtained by passing up to three additional subjects, two of which could be languages. Belchem was selected for Russian language training. In January 1935, he moved to Kensington in London, where he lodged with a family who spoke only Russian, and attended the School of Oriental Studies, where he studied Russian grammar. On 16 April 1935, he took the train to Tallinn in Estonia for immersion in the Russian language. With this completed, on 16 January 1936 he boarded a train for the two-day trip back to London, where he sat his oral and written Civil Service interpreter examinations, earning a first class qualification as an Army interpreter.

After a short period of leave, Belchem boarded the troopship RMS Cameronia in Southampton to join the 6th Royal Tank Regiment, which was based in Cairo in Egypt. On 9 May 1936, his squadron, consisting of fourteen Vickers Mark III light tanks, was sent to Mandatory Palestine due to the outbreak of the Arab revolt. Belchem was in command of a detachment of six tanks based at Surafend, where they were attached to the Royal Scots Fusiliers. He found his Russian useful for talking to the Jewish population, who mostly spoke Russian or German, whereas most British officials spoke only English and Arabic, and he was often called to act as an interpreter. His unit returned to Cairo on 3 November 1936. He was mentioned in despatches for his service in Palestine.

The main work of the 6th Royal Tank Regiment at this time was instructing cavalry units that were converting to armour, with varying degrees of enthusiasm. Belchem took the written section of the promotion examination by correspondence through the Metropolitan Services College in St Albans, earning a distinction. The same mark in the practical examination would secure staff college entry, but he was aware that the staff in the Middle East seldom awarded it, so bided his time and took lessons in Italian. He returned to London on 29 August 1937, where he pursued a course of study in the Italian language at London University. He secured permission to sit the captain's examination at Pirbright in February 1938, and earned a distinction. Afterwards, he headed for Florence, for further study of Italian. In May, he was assigned to an Italian armoured unit as an exchange officer. He returned to London in August, and sat the Civil Service oral and written interpreter examinations, earning another first class qualification as an Army interpreter. He returned to Cairo in September, and was assigned to the intelligence department in Palestine. He was promoted to captain on 21 January 1939. The Metropolitan Service College awarded him a scholarship to prepare for the staff college examination in March 1939. He passed, and with his bonus credits was one of the top ten candidates. He was ordered to report to the Staff College, Camberley, in September. Belchem proceeded to the UK on leave, but the impending outbreak of the Second World War, which occurred on 3 September 1939, caused his orders to be changed, and he immediately returned to Palestine.

== Second World War ==
A new staff college was established at Haifa in Palestine, with an abbreviated three and a half month wartime course. Belchem attended the course from March to June 1940, and was then assigned to the intelligence staff in Cairo, with the temporary rank of major.

=== Greece ===
In February 1941, he was sent to Athens as the General Staff Officer Grade 2 (GSO2) in the headquarters (HQ) of W Force, an expeditionary force being sent to Greece. The German invasion of Greece in April sent the Allied forces reeling, and, with radio communications down, Belchem personally conveyed a note to the commander of the Australian I Corps, Lieutenant-General Sir Thomas Blamey, ordering the evacuation of Greece. Belchem embarked for Crete on a caïque on 24 April, but was picked up by a British destroyer during the night. On reaching Suda Bay, his Brigadier, General Staff (BGS), Brigadier Alexander Galloway, told him the New Zealand 6th Infantry Brigade had been left behind in Greece under the mistaken impression that it had been captured. Galloway and Belchem returned to Monemvasia with a communications unit to coordinate its evacuation, which was accomplished, returning to Crete on the light cruiser HMS Ajax. Belchem was mentioned in despatches.

=== Western Desert ===
After returning to Egypt, Belchem was posted to General Headquarters (GHQ) Middle East Command on 15 May 1941. He trained a South African Women's Auxiliary Army Service to do the job in the hope of being able to return to his regiment. He received orders to join the 1st Royal Tank Regiment, but before they could take effect he was assigned instead to the headquarters of the newly formed Eighth Army. Galloway was appointed the BGS, and he assembled a new HQ staff drawing on officers he knew from W Force or from his time as commandant of the staff college in Haifa, or, in Belchem's case, both. Belchem became the General Staff Officer Grade 1 (GSO1) (Staff Duties), the officer in charge of the Army's organisation and the main link between the general staff and administrative staff branches, with the temporary rank of lieutenant-colonel. He served in this role during Operation Crusader, Battle of Gazala, Battle of Alam el Halfa and the Battle of El Alamein. For his service in the Western Desert campaign between November 1941 and March 1942, he was made an Officer of the Order of the British Empire, the Eighth Army commander, Lieutenant-General Neil Ritchie, noting on the citation that Belchem's work was "outstanding", and he was mentioned in despatches a third time for the subsequent operations in the Western Desert.

In December Belchem experienced stomach pains, which the medical officer diagnosed as appendicitis, and he was flown to the 15th (Scottish) General Hospital in Cairo. His post of GSO1 (Staff Duties) was taken over by George Baker. When he recovered, he was assigned to the 2nd Armoured Brigade as its brigade major. This involved dropping down a rank to major, but was in line with a policy laid down by the Eighth Army's commander, General Sir Bernard Montgomery, that a staff officer would not be promoted without first serving for a time with an operational unit. On 29 December Belchem joined the 2nd Armoured Brigade at Timimi, which was now 450 miles (720 km) from the front lines. He became the only Royal Tank Regiment officer in the brigade. The brigade commander, Brigadier Arthur Fisher, rated him highly, and on 23 January 1943, he was appointed to command the 1st Royal Tank Regiment, part of the 7th Armoured Division's 22nd Armoured Brigade.

=== Tunisia ===
Belchem led the 1st Royal Tank Regiment in the Tunisian campaign, and was recommended for an immediate award of the Distinguished Service Order (DSO). His citation, written by his brigade commander, Brigadier Robert Hinde, read:

This officer was commanding his regiment on 8 April 1943 during the pursuit to SFAX from the AKARIT position. The regiment was instrumental in cutting off a column of enemy MET [transport] in the area SI MOHAMED EN NOUIERS Z.2293 and inflicting considerable casualties on them in personnel and vehicles. Towards evening the Regiment carried out an out-flanking movement against an enemy rearguard of tanks and Anti-Tank guns in the area U.3602 and succeeded in turning the enemy's flank in spite of difficult ground.

On 9 April 1943 in the EL AGAREB area U.6131, the Reg[imen]t was ordered to cut off a mixed column of enemy MET, guns and tanks which towards evening was approaching EL AGAREB from the WEST. L[ieutenan]t. Col[onel]. BELCHEM handled his Reg[imen]t with great vigour and determination by-passed some enemy tanks which opened fire on his right flank during the advance and closed within 1000 yards of the enemy column, which was then most successfully engaged. 8 enemy tanks which attempted to interfere were held off by the skilful positioning of one squadron. Some 30 lorries and half tracked vehicles and one Mk III tank, besides guns and much equipment were found on the battlefield next day. There is no doubt that severe casualties were inflicted on this column, which was thrown into complete confusion. The country on 9 April was very difficult owing to continuous olive groves in the line of the advance; and had it not been for the drive and tactical ability of L[ieutenan]t. Col[onel]. BELCHEM, the enemy might well have got clean away.

Altogether the "bag" of this Regiment between the Wadi AKARIT and SFAX was 5 or 6 tanks, 16 guns, 11 half tracks, 45 wheeled vehicles, 749 PWs and many enemy dead. The greatest credit for this profitable operation must go to the commanding officer, whose skilful handling of his Regiment in difficult circumstances was largely responsible for its success.

=== Italy ===
On 17 April Montgomery informed Belchem that he would rejoin Eighth Army HQ as the GSO1 (Operations), with the rank of lieutenant-colonel. On 30 April 1943, he joined a staff in Cairo under the Eighth Army's chief of staff, Major-General Freddie de Guingand, that was planning the Allied invasion of Sicily. Belchem served as GSO1 (Operations) at Eighth Army HQ until the end of the Sicilian operation, when Brigadier Charles Richardson was sent to command the British component of the staff of the US Fifth Army. Belchem replaced him as BGS (Operations and Plans), with the rank of brigadier, and directed the Eighth Army's operations in the Allied invasion of Italy. Montgomery handed over command of the Eighth Army to Lieutenant-General Sir Oliver Leese on 31 December 1943, taking a select group of seven officers, including de Guingand, to the UK with him. Belchem remained at Eighth Army HQ to assist Leese with the transition, but not for long; on 8 January 1944 he received orders to join the others.

=== North-West Europe ===
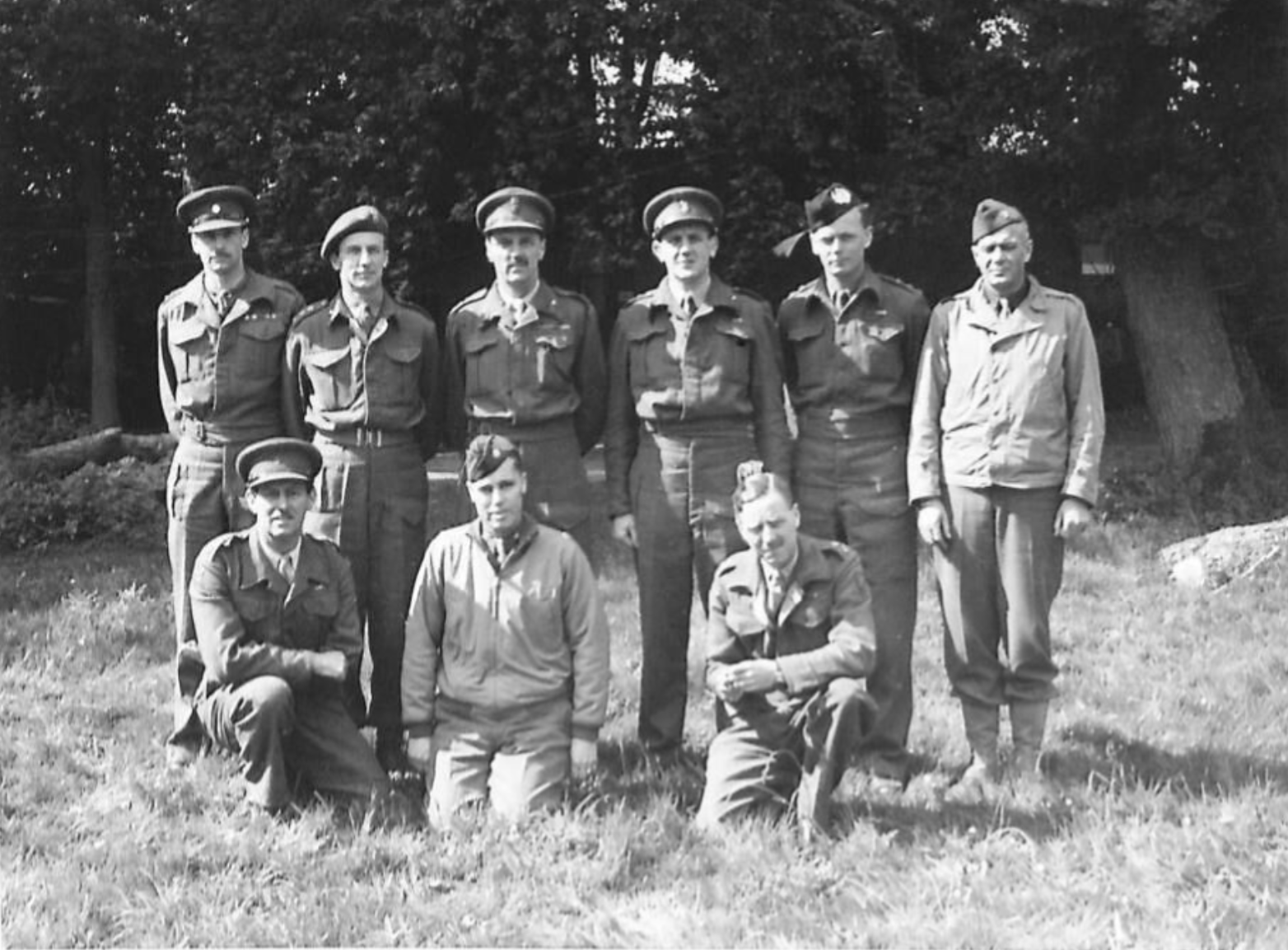
Belchem (back row, third from the left) with his G (Operations) staff

Belchem reported to Montgomery in London on 14 February 1944. Montgomery gave him 24-hours leave before assuming the interim role of BGS (Special Plans) at 21st Army Group HQ. When operations commenced he assumed the key role of BGS (Operations). This was considered the most important role in the General Staff (G) branch. In addition to the general staff officer tasks of preparing and issuing orders and directives, the BGS (Operations) had to keep Montgomery, de Guingand and the operations staff of the 2nd Tactical Air Force informed of the progress of operations; liaise with the intelligence branch; and keep the situation maps in the Operations Room and the Information Room up to date. He also acted as de Guingand's deputy and, despite his lack of seniority, as chief of staff in de Guingand's absence, including for an entire month in early 1945 when de Guingand was ill.

For his role in Operation Overlord, Belchem was made a Commander of the Order of the British Empire. After the war ended, he was made a Companion of the Order of the Bath, and mentioned in despatches twice more for his role in the Western Allied invasion of Germany. He also received accolades from Allied nations; he was made a Knight Commander of the Order of Orange-Nassau with Swords by the Netherlands, a Commander of the Order of the White Lion by Czechoslovakia, and an officer of the Legion of Merit by the United States.

== Post-war career and life ==
On 25 August 1945, the 21st Army Group became the British Army of the Rhine (BAOR), with its Main HQ located at Bad Oeynhausen. In September Belchem was summoned to Gut Ostenwalde, where Montgomery had his residence. Belchem's assignment was to write up Montgomery's wartime campaigns. To assist, he had three shorthand typists and a research assistant, Lieutenant-Colonel A. E. Warhurst. Montgomery and Belchem would discuss each phase and relevant documents would be identified. A draft would be produced, which Belchem would go over with Montgomery until the latter was satisfied. The result was two volumes, which were published under Montgomery's name in 1946: El Alamein to the Sangro and Normandy to the Baltic. Belchem was not credited. The books aroused little controversy, as details of disagreements with other commanders were omitted.

Montgomery returned to the UK in June 1946, but before leaving he arranged for Belchem to attend the Imperial Defence College from January to December 1947. In January 1948 Belchem assumed command of the 6th (Highland) Infantry Brigade, which was stationed at Mülheim in Germany as part of the BAOR. On 8 October 1948, he became chief of staff to Montgomery, who had been appointed the chairman of the Committee for Western Union Defence Organisation. Meetings were conducted in French. Montgomery had considerable difficulty working with French General Jean de Lattre de Tassigny. Belchem married Constance King in 1947; the marriage ended in divorce. On 29 December 1950, he relinquished the rank of major-general, becoming a brigadier once more, and took command of the 33rd Armoured Brigade in Germany.

== Later life ==
On 18 December 1953, Belchem retired from the Army with the rank of major-general. He worked in the field of nuclear power for Tube Investments. He published a book on the subject A Guide to Nuclear Energy (1958). Later in life he published his memoirs, All in the Day's March (1978) and an insider's account of the Normandy campaign, Victory in Normandy (1981).

Belchem died on 19 July 1981. Most of his papers are in the Imperial War Museum; some correspondence with Sir Basil Liddell Hart and John North is held by the Liddell Hart Centre for Military Archives at King's College London.

== Dates of rank ==
Second lieutenant	Lieutenant	Captain	Major
29 January 1931	29 January 1934	21 January 1939	June 1940 (temporary); 1 July 1946

Lieutenant-Colonel	Colonel	Brigadier	Major-general
10 December 1941 (temporary); 25 February 1942 (war substantive)	31 December 1949	25 August 1943 (temporary); 1 February 1950; 29 December 1950 (reverted)	9 October 1948 (temporary); 18 December 1953 (retired)

== Bibliography ==
- Belchem, David (1958). A Guide to Nuclear Energy. London: Pittman. OCLC 969682349.
- Belchem, David (1978). All in the Day's March. London: William Collins & Sons. ISBN 0-00-211368-6. OCLC 4809299.
- Belchem, David (1981). Victory in Normandy. London: Chatto & Windus. OCLC 490814958.
