= Prince of Wales Batteries =

The Prince of Wales Batteries were a group of artillery batteries built in Gibraltar between 1859–60 and named after Albert Edward, Prince of Wales (and later King Edward VII), who laid the batteries' foundation stone on 13 May 1859. They stood on the West Side of Gibraltar, facing the sea, and were constructed on top of the former Prince Henry's Battery, built during the Anglo-Spanish War of 1762–3. The batteries were originally intended to mount four 32-pdr guns but they were extended to mount eleven guns in four groups. They were rebuilt again around 1872 when two new gun emplacements were built on top of Nos. 2 and 3 batteries to accommodate two 9-inch rifled muzzle loader guns.

== Bibliography ==
- Hughes, Quentin; Migos, Athanassios (1995). Strong as the Rock of Gibraltar. Gibraltar: Exchange Publications. OCLC 48491998.
