= John Fox Burgoyne =

British Army officer (1782–1871)

Field Marshal Sir John Fox Burgoyne GCB Bt
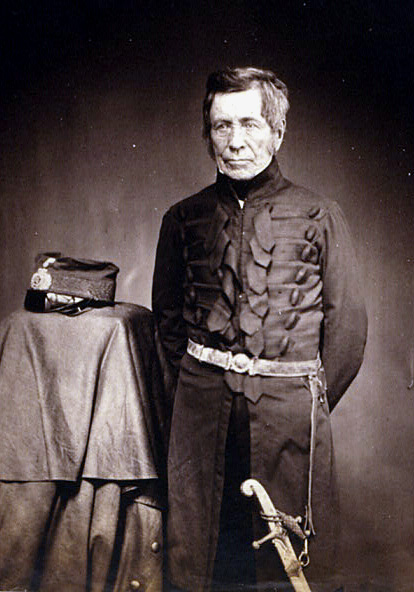
- Lieutenant General Sir John Fox Burgoyne, GCB, photo by Roger Fenton, 1855
- Born: 24 July 1782
- Died: 7 October 1871 (aged 89); Kensington, London
- Military career
- Allegiance: United Kingdom
- Branch: British Army
- Service years: 1798–1868
- Rank: Field Marshal
- Conflicts: French Revolutionary Wars; Peninsular War; War of 1812; Crimean War
- Awards: Knight Grand Cross of the Order of the Bath

Field Marshal Sir John Fox Burgoyne, 1st Baronet, GCB (24 July 1782 – 7 October 1871) was a British Army officer. After taking part in the Siege of Malta during the French Revolutionary Wars, he saw action under Sir John Moore and then under the Duke of Wellington in numerous battles of the Peninsular War, including the Siege of Badajoz and the Battle of Vitoria. He served under Sir Edward Pakenham as chief engineer during the War of 1812. He went on to act as official advisor to Lord Raglan during the Crimean War advocating the Bay of Kalamita as the point of disembarkation for allied forces and recommending a Siege of Sevastopol from the south side rather than a coup de main, so consigning the allied forces to a winter in the field in 1854.

== Military career ==
Born the illegitimate son of General John Burgoyne and the opera singer Susan Caulfield, Burgoyne was brought up by the 12th Earl of Derby (a nephew of his father's late wife) following his father's early death. Educated at Eton College and the Royal Military Academy, Woolwich, he was commissioned as a second lieutenant in the Royal Engineers on 29 August 1798. Promoted to lieutenant on 1 July 1800, he took part in the Siege of Malta in Autumn 1800 during the French Revolutionary Wars before becoming aide-de-camp to General Henry Fox. Promoted again, this time to second captain on 18 March 1805, he took part in the capture of Alexandria in February 1807 and the subsequent occupation of Rosetta in April 1807.

During the Peninsular War, Burgoyne became commanding engineer on the staff of Sir John Moore in April 1808 and went with Moore's army to Sweden in May 1808 and to Portugal in September 1808. He then took part in the retreat from Corunna blowing up bridges behind the retreating army in January 1809.

Burgoyne returned to Portugal in April 1809 to join Sir Arthur Wellesley's army. Promoted to captain on 5 July 1809, Burgoyne became engineer officer for the 3rd Division, in which role he took part in the Battle of Bussaco in September 1810, the Second Siege of Badajoz in June 1811 and the Siege of Ciudad Rodrigo in January 1812. Promoted to brevet major on 6 February 1812, he led the storming parties at the Siege of Badajoz in March 1812. Promoted again this time to brevet lieutenant colonel on 27 April 1812, he took part in the Battle of Salamanca in July 1812, the Siege of Burgos in September 1812 and the Battle of Vitoria in June 1813 before going on to be present at the Siege of San Sebastián in August 1813, the Battle of Nivelle in November 1813 and the Battle of the Nive in December 1813. In the closing stages of the War he was also present at the crossing of the River Adour in February 1814 and the Battle of Bayonne in April 1814. He was appointed a Companion of the Order of the Bath in 1814.

In the War of 1812, Burgoyne went to the United States and fought under General Edward Pakenham as chief engineer at the Battle of New Orleans in January 1815 and at the Second Battle of Fort Bowyer in February 1815. He then served as chief engineer of the Army of Occupation in France until 1821 when he became commanding engineer at the Royal Engineers Depot, Chatham. In 1826 he accompanied General Henry Clinton on a mission to Portugal to support the constitutional government against the absolutist forces of Dom Miguel. He became garrison engineer at Portsmouth in 1828 and, having been promoted to brevet colonel on 22 July 1830, became chairman of the Board of Public Works in Ireland.

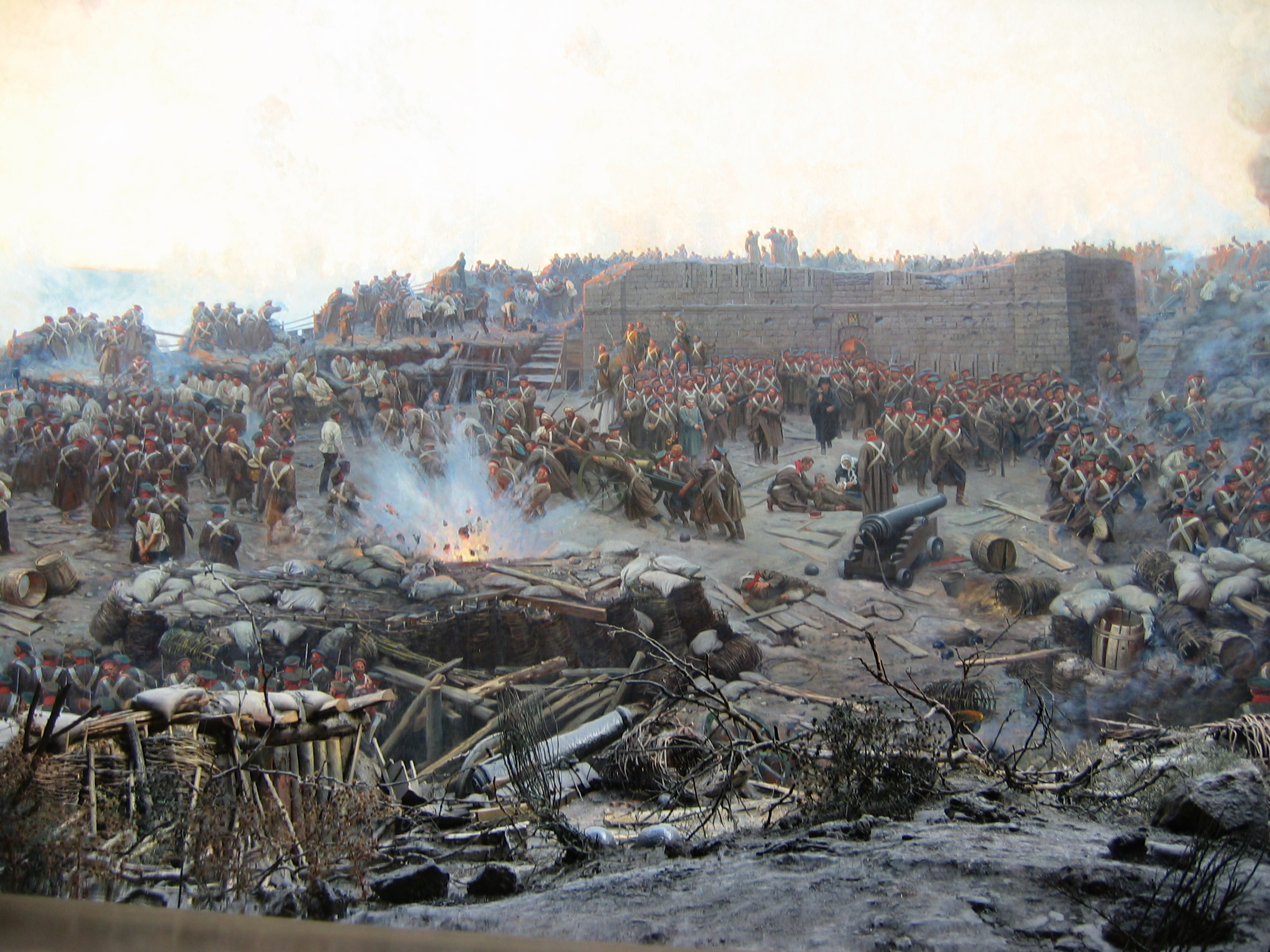
Siege of Sevastopol by Franz Roubaud

Promoted to the substantive rank of colonel on 10 January 1837 and to the rank of major-general on 28 June 1838, Burgoyne was advanced to Knight Commander of the Order of the Bath on 19 July 1838 and became Inspector-General of Fortifications in 1845. In this role he advised on relief works during the Great Famine in Ireland. He also advised on the fortifications in Gibraltar in 1848 making the wise recommendation that the guns on the Devil's Tongue Battery be directed into Gibraltar Harbour. He was promoted to lieutenant general on 11 November 1851 and advanced to Knight Grand Cross of the Order of the Bath on 31 March 1852.

Before the outbreak of the Crimean War, Burgoyne went to Constantinople to assist in its fortification and that of the Dardanelles. Appointed an official advisor to Lord Raglan, he advocated the Bay of Kalamita as the point of disembarkation for allied forces and recommended skirting Sevastopol to the east to facilitate a siege from the south side rather than a coup de main, so consigning the allied forces to a winter in the field in 1854. He became colonel commandant of the Royal Engineers on 22 November 1854 and, following his recall to England in February 1855, he was promoted to full general on 5 September 1855. He was created a baronet on 18 April 1856 and awarded the French Legion of Honour, 2nd Class on 2 August 1856. He was appointed one of the Colonels Commandant of the Royal Engineers in 1854, and also served as honorary colonel of 1st Middlesex Engineer Volunteer Corps and of the 1st Lancashire Engineer Volunteer Corps.

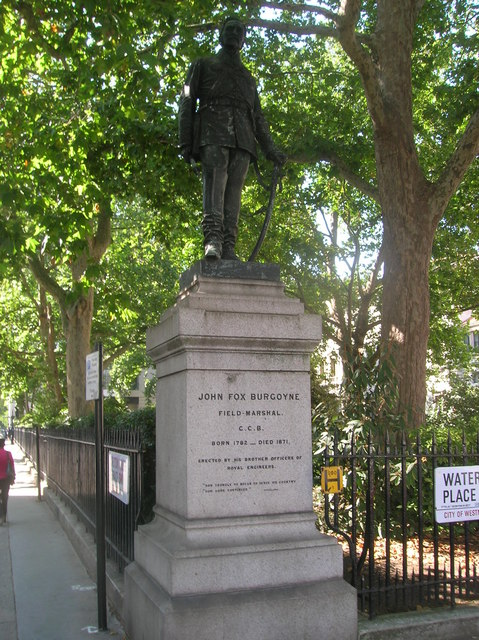
Statue in Waterloo Place, London

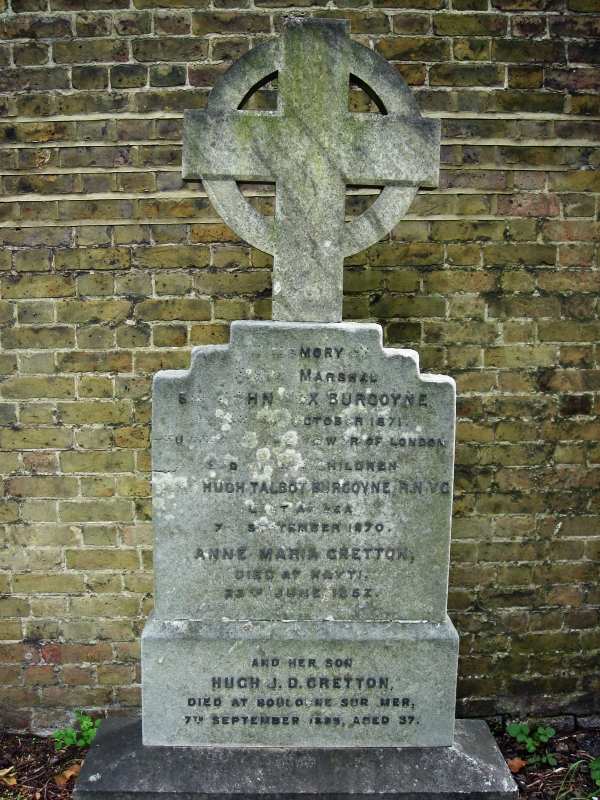
Funerary monument, Brompton Cemetery, London

Burgoyne was appointed Constable of the Tower in April 1865 and promoted to field marshal on his retirement on 1 January 1868. He died at 5, Pembridge Square, Bayswater, Kensington in London on 7 October 1871 and was buried at the Church of St Peter ad Vincula. Castle Hill Fort in Dover was renamed Fort Burgoyne in memory of him.

== Family ==
In 1821 Burgoyne married Charlotte Rose; they had a son, (Captain Hugh Talbot Burgoyne VC), and seven daughters. One of their grandchildren was the preacher, Charles Spurgeon.

Military offices
Preceded by Sir Frederick Mulcaster	Inspector-General of Fortifications; 1845–1862	Succeeded by Himself
Preceded by Himself	Inspector-General of Engineers and Director of Work; 1862–1868	Succeeded by Edward Frome
Honorary titles
Preceded by The Viscount Combermere	Constable of the Tower; Lord Lieutenant of the Tower Hamlets; 1865–1871	Succeeded by Sir George Pollock
Baronetage of the United Kingdom
New creation	Baronet (of the Army); 1856–1871	Extinct
