= Malcolm Rutherford =

Vice Admiral Malcolm Rutherford CBE
- Born: 21 March 1941
- Died: 6 June 1997 (aged 56)
- Military career
- Allegiance: United Kingdom
- Branch: Royal Navy
- Rank: Vice admiral
- Conflicts: Gulf War
- Awards: Commander of the Order of the British Empire

Vice Admiral Malcolm Graham Rutherford CBE (21 March 1941 – 6 June 1997) was a Royal Navy officer who became Deputy Chief of the Defence Staff (Equipment Capability).

== Naval career ==
Educated at New College School, Gordonstoun and the Royal Naval College, Dartmouth, Rutherford joined the Royal Navy in 1959. Promoted to captain in 1984, he was appointed Weapon Systems Director for the Upholder class of submarines and then Commander of the Weapon Engineering Training Establishment HMS Collingwood. Promoted to commodore in 1990, he became Director of Personnel at the Ministry of Defence and was awarded the CBE for his service during the Gulf War.

Following promotion to rear admiral, he was made Naval Secretary in 1992 and Deputy Chief of the Defence Staff (Equipment Capability) in 1994 as vice admiral. He retired in 1995 and died in 1997.

== Family ==
He was married to Fleur, and they had two children.

Military offices
Preceded by Christopher Morgan	Naval Secretary; 1992–1994	Succeeded by Alan West
Preceded by Sir Roger Austin	Deputy Chief of the Defence Staff (Equipment Capability); 1994–1995	Succeeded by Sir John Dunt
