= Chief Royal Engineer =

Head of the Corps of Royal Engineers of the British Army

The Chief Royal Engineer (CRE) is the official head of the Corps of Royal Engineers of the British Army.

== Origin and development ==
Before the English Restoration a Chief Engineer was a pay grade and not defined. In 1660 Charles II appointed Sir Charles Lloyd, who had served in the English Civil War, as head of a new department of engineers. The position was confirmed in a Royal Warrant (26 May 1716), which also authorised the formation of the Corps of Engineers.

When in 1802, Sir William Green, 1st Baronet retired, the office was abolished and Robert Morse became the newly created Inspector-General of Fortifications and of Royal Engineers (IGF). Until 1855 the Inspector-General was attached to the Board of Ordnance and then was subordinate directly to the Commander-in-Chief.

In 1862 the office was extended to Inspector-General of Engineers and Director of Work, keeping the affiliation in the former function while being now responsible to the Secretary of State for War in the latter. On the resignation of Edward Frome in 1869, both offices were separated for one year. The Director of Works was dropped in 1895 and the office was renamed to Inspector-General of Fortifications. It was again abolished in 1904 and replaced by the Director of Fortifications and Works.

== Modern times ==
In 1936 the post of Chief Royal Engineer was recreated and Sir Bindon Blood was appointed by King George V. Sir Bindon was commissioned into the Royal Engineers in 1860 and had a distinguished active career until he retired in 1907 aged 65. He was thus 94 years old when appointed Chief Royal Engineer. He resigned in 1940 and died a month later aged 97.

From 1941 until 2012 the professional head of the Corps was the Engineer-in-Chief (Army) (EinC(A)) who as 'Director of Royal Engineers', acted as the engineer advisor to the Chief of the General Staff (CGS) as well as to the Royal Navy, the Royal Air Force and other government ministries on matters of military engineering on behalf of the CGS. This post was disestablished following the Strategic Defence and Security Review 2010 and responsibility for the EinC's duties split between the Commandant Royal School of Military Engineering (heritage and training), Commander 8 Engineer Brigade (force generation matters) and the Corps Colonel RE (manning matters and first point of contact with external agencies).

The Chief Royal Engineer is head of the Corps of Royal Engineers and invariably a distinguished officer of the Corps; his tenure in the post is normally for a period of five years. He is responsible for seeing that the Corps' traditions and customs are preserved and the continuity of important matters of Corps policy. He keeps the Colonel-in-Chief informed on Corps matters and maintains contact with engineer units in the Commonwealth. He will have previously served as a Colonel Commandant and will continue to fill one of the vacancies.

== Chief Royal Engineers, 1660–1802 ==
- 1660–1661: Sir Charles Lloyd
- Apr – Dec 1661: Sir Bernard de Gomme
- 1661–1685: Sir Godfrey Lloyd
- 1685–1702: Sir Martin Beckman

vacant for nine years

- 1711–1714: Michael Richards
- 1714–1742: John Armstrong
- 1742–1751: Thomas Lascelles

vacant for six years

- 1757–1781: William Skinner
- 1781–1786: James Bramham
- 1786–1802: Sir William Green, 1st Baronet

== Inspectors-General of Fortifications, 1802–1862 ==
- 1802–1811: Robert Morse
- 1811–1830: Gother Mann
- 1830–1832: Sir Alexander Bryce
- 1832–1834: Robert Pilkington
- 1834–1845: Sir Frederick Mulcaster
- 1845–1862: John Fox Burgoyne

== Inspectors-General of Engineers and Directors of Work, 1862–1869 ==
- 1862–1868: Sir John Burgoyne, 1st Baronet
- 1868–1869: Edward Frome

== Inspectors-General of Engineers, 1869–1870 ==
- 1869–1870: Sir John William Gordon

== Inspectors-General of Fortifications and Directors of Work, 1870–1895 ==
- 1870–1875: Sir Frederick Chapman
- 1875–1880: Sir Lintorn Simmons
- 1880–1882: Thomas Lionel John Gallwey
- 1882–1886: Sir Andrew Clarke
- 1886–1895: Lothian Nicholson
- 1891–1895: Sir Robert Grant

== Inspectors-General of Fortifications, 1895–1904 ==
- 1895–1898: Sir Robert Grant
- 1898–1903: Sir Richard Harrison
- 1903–1904: William Terence Shone

== Directors of Fortifications and Works, 1904–1936 ==
- 1904–1908: Richard Ruck
- 1908–1911: Frederick Rainsford-Hannay
- 1911–1918: George Kenneth Scott-Moncrieff
- 1918–1920: Philip Geoffrey Twining
- 1920–1924: Sir William Andrew Liddell
- 1924–1927: Henry Fleetwood Thuillier
- 1927–1936: Philip Gordon Grant

== Chief Royal Engineers, 1936–present ==
- 1936–1940: Sir Bindon Blood
- 1940–1946: Sir Ronald Charles
- 1946–1951: Sir Guy Williams
- 1951–1958: Sir Edwin Morris
- 1958–1961: Sir Kenneth Crawford
- 1961–1967: Sir Frank Simpson
- 1967–1972: Sir Charles Jones
- 1972–1977: Sir Charles Richardson
- 1977–1983: Sir David Willison
- 1983–1987: Sir Hugh Beach
- 1987–1993: Sir George Cooper
- 1993–1999: Sir John Stibbon
- 1999–2004: Sir Scott Grant
- 2004–2009: Sir Kevin O'Donoghue
- 2009–2013: Sir Peter Wall
- 2013–2018: Sir Mark Mans
- 2018–2024: Sir Tyrone Urch
- 2024–present: Sir Christopher Tickell
