= Christopher Morgan (Royal Navy officer) =

Vice Admiral Sir Christopher Morgan KBE
- Born: 11 March 1939 (age 87)
- Military career
- Allegiance: United Kingdom
- Branch: Royal Navy
- Rank: Vice Admiral
- Commands: HMS Eskimo; HMS Southampton
- Conflicts: First Cod War; Kuwait crisis Brunei Revolt; Indonesia–Malaysia confrontation
- Awards: Knight Commander of the Order of the British Empire

Vice Admiral Sir Charles Christopher Morgan KBE (born 11 March 1939) is a former Royal Navy officer who became Naval Secretary.

== Naval career ==
Educated at the Royal Naval College, Dartmouth, Morgan joined the Royal Navy in 1959 and was involved in the First Cod War with Iceland in 1960. He also saw action during the Kuwait crisis in 1961, the Brunei Revolt in 1962 and the Indonesia–Malaysia confrontation in 1962. He was given command of the frigate HMS Eskimo in 1976 and, having been promoted to captain, he joined the Operational Requirements Division at the Ministry of Defence in 1981 and was given command of the destroyer HMS Southampton in 1986. He became Naval Secretary in 1990 and Flag Officer Scotland, Northern England and Northern Ireland in 1992 before retiring in 1996.

In retirement he was appointed Director-General of the UK Chamber of Shipping.

Military offices
| Preceded by David Dobson | Naval Secretary; 1990–1992 | Succeeded by Malcolm Rutherford |
| Preceded by Sir Hugo White | Flag Officer, Scotland and Northern Ireland (Flag Officer Scotland, Northern England and Northern Ireland from 1994); 1992–1996 | Succeeded by John Tolhurst |
