= Louis Le Bailly =

Royal Navy admiral (1915–2010)

Vice-Admiral Sir Louis Le Bailly KBE CB
- Born: 18 July 1915
- Died: 3 October 2010 (aged 95); Bude, Cornwall
- Military career
- Allegiance: United Kingdom
- Branch: Royal Navy
- Service years: 1932–1972
- Rank: Vice-Admiral
- Conflicts: Second World War; Cold War

Vice-Admiral Sir Louis Edward Stewart Holland Le Bailly KBE CB (18 July 1915 – 3 October 2010) was a Royal Navy officer who became director-general of intelligence and later a writer.

== Naval career and retirement ==
Le Bailly was born the son of Robert Francis Le Bailly and Ida Gaskell Le Bailly (née Holland). He attended the Britannia Royal Naval College, Dartmouth, between 1929 and 1932 and joined HMS Hood as a midshipman. He attended the Royal Naval Engineering College in Keyham between 1933 and 1937, returning to HMS Hood as an engineer lieutenant. He left the Hood in 1940 and served aboard HMS Naiad, surviving the sinking of that ship in 1942. After serving at the RN Engineering College, Le Bailly was posted to the battleship HMS Duke of York in 1944, where he served as lieutenant commander and was present at the Japanese surrender.

Le Bailly served at the Admiralty from 1946 and aboard HMS Bermuda from 1950. He subsequently served at the Admiralty from 1955 to 1958 and as staff officer to the Dartmouth Review Committee in 1958. He was appointed assistant engineer-in-chief in 1958 and naval assistant to Controller of the Navy in 1960. He went on to be deputy director of marine engineering in 1964, naval attaché and head of the Royal Navy staff in Washington, D.C., in 1967 and Deputy Chief of Defence Staff (Intelligence) in 1971 before retiring from the Royal Navy in 1972.

In retirement he was appointed director-general of intelligence at the Ministry of Defence in 1972. Later he became vice chairman of the Institute for Study of Conflict, and chairman of the Civil Service Selection Board.

Le Bailly led a campaign for his local pub in St Tudy, Cornwall, to be renamed after William Bligh who was born in the village. He wrote many letters to newspapers such as The Times and The Daily Telegraph, often calling for British withdrawal from the European Union which eventually happened after his death, but also sometimes on more whimsical matters. For his Eurosceptic views he was criticised by Auberon Waugh; after he joined with his fellow villagers in a petition asking for a referendum on Britain's membership of the EU, Waugh denounced "terrified and resentful" Eurosceptics "mumbl[ing] their platitudes about British sovereignty".

On his death in 2010 he was survived by his wife, Pamela (née Berthon); Sir Louis died on their 64th wedding anniversary, as they had been married on 2 October 1946 at Holy Trinity Brompton Church, and by their daughters Susanna, Charlotte and Belinda, and the children of his daughters. Lady Le Bailly died in 2019.

== Works ==
Le Bailly was a prolific writer; his writings include four published books;

- 1990: A Man Around the Engine
- 1991: From Fisher to the Falklands
- 1994: Old Loves Return
- 2007: We Should Look to Our Moat

Military offices
Preceded by Sir Richard Fyffe	Deputy Chief of Defence Staff (Intelligence); 1971–1972	Succeeded by Sir David Willison
Government offices
Preceded by Sir Harold Maguire	Director-General Intelligence; 1972–1975	Succeeded by Sir David Willison
