= Thomas Lascelles (engineer) =

British army officer and engineer

Colonel Thomas Lascelles
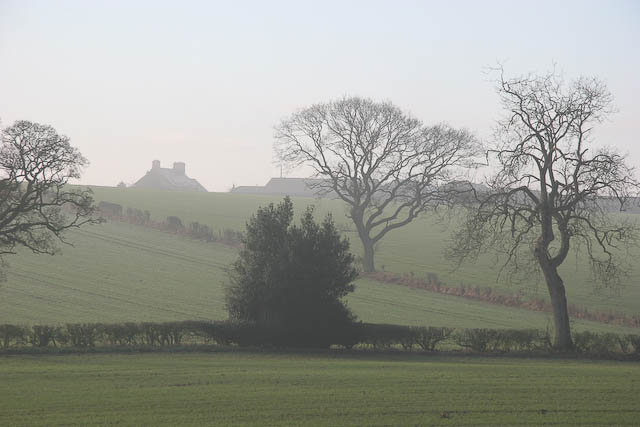
- Landscape near Ganthorpe, Lascelles' birthplace
- Born: 1 May 1670; Terrington, Yorkshire
- Died: 1 November 1751 (aged 81); Pontefract, Yorkshire
- Military career
- Allegiance: England; Great Britain
- Branch: English Army; British Army
- Service years: 1689–1750
- Rank: Colonel
- Commands: Chief Royal Engineer and Surveyor-General of the Ordnance
- Conflicts: Williamite War in Ireland; Battle of the Boyne; War of the Spanish Succession; Cadiz 1702 Battle of Blenheim 1704; Jacobite rising of 1715

Signature
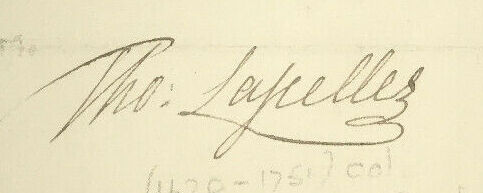

Colonel Thomas Lascelles (c.1670 – 1 November 1751) was a British army officer and engineer who held a number of senior positions between 1713 and 1750. These included supervising the demolition of harbour facilities at Dunkirk from 1713 to 1733, and serving as Chief Royal Engineer and Surveyor-General of the Ordnance from 1742 to 1750. He died in November 1751.

== Life ==
The Lascelles were part of a network of mercantile interests in London, Ireland, New England and Barbados, with branches across Yorkshire, including Northallerton, Durham, Whitby, York, Harewood House and Terrington. They also tended to re-use the same names (Thomas, Francis, Henry, Robert, Peregine etc.) which can make tracing individuals extremely complex.

Thomas Lascelles came from a junior branch with estates in Ganthorpe, near Terrington and was born in May 1670. He was the eldest son of Thomas Lascelles (1634-1706) and Maria Moorwood. He had two surviving brothers, Francis (1672-1753), vicar of Knottingley, Yorkshire and William, killed at Mons in 1709, plus three sisters, Maria, Elizabeth and Sarah. He does not appear to have married and left £10,000 plus estates at Hunton and Scotton to his younger brother Francis.

== Career ==
John Armstrong (1674-1742); fellow engineer and a long-term colleague he first met in 1691

He volunteered for the 1689-1691 Williamite War in Ireland, which was when he first met John Armstrong, beginning a professional relationship that lasted until Armstrong's death in 1742. He fought at the Battle of the Boyne in 1690, then transferred to Flanders when the war ended in 1691 and took part in the Nine Years War.

When the War of the Spanish Succession began in 1702, he and Armstrong joined the Duke of Ormonde's Horse Guards and fought at Cadiz. He received his first commission in 1704 as a Captain in Owen Wynne's Regiment of Foot and was paid another £100 per annum as an engineer, which he shared with Armstrong. They both took part in Marlborough's Flanders campaigns; Lascelles was seriously wounded at the Battle of Blenheim in 1704 and appears in the Blenheim Roll, receiving £33 from the £65,000 distributed to members of Churchill's army by Queen Anne.

Wynne's Regiment was disbanded when the war ended in 1713 and he was placed on half-pay. Under the Peace of Utrecht, France agreed to 'level the fortifications of Dunkirk, block up the port and demolish the sluices that scour the harbour, (which) shall never be reconstructed.'

Dunkirk was a major privateer base for raiding British merchantmen, since it was possible to reach the North Sea in a single tide and escape British patrols in the Channel. This made it a high-profile operation of great significance to the powerful London mercantile interest and in September 1713, Lascelles and Armstrong were appointed to supervise operations.

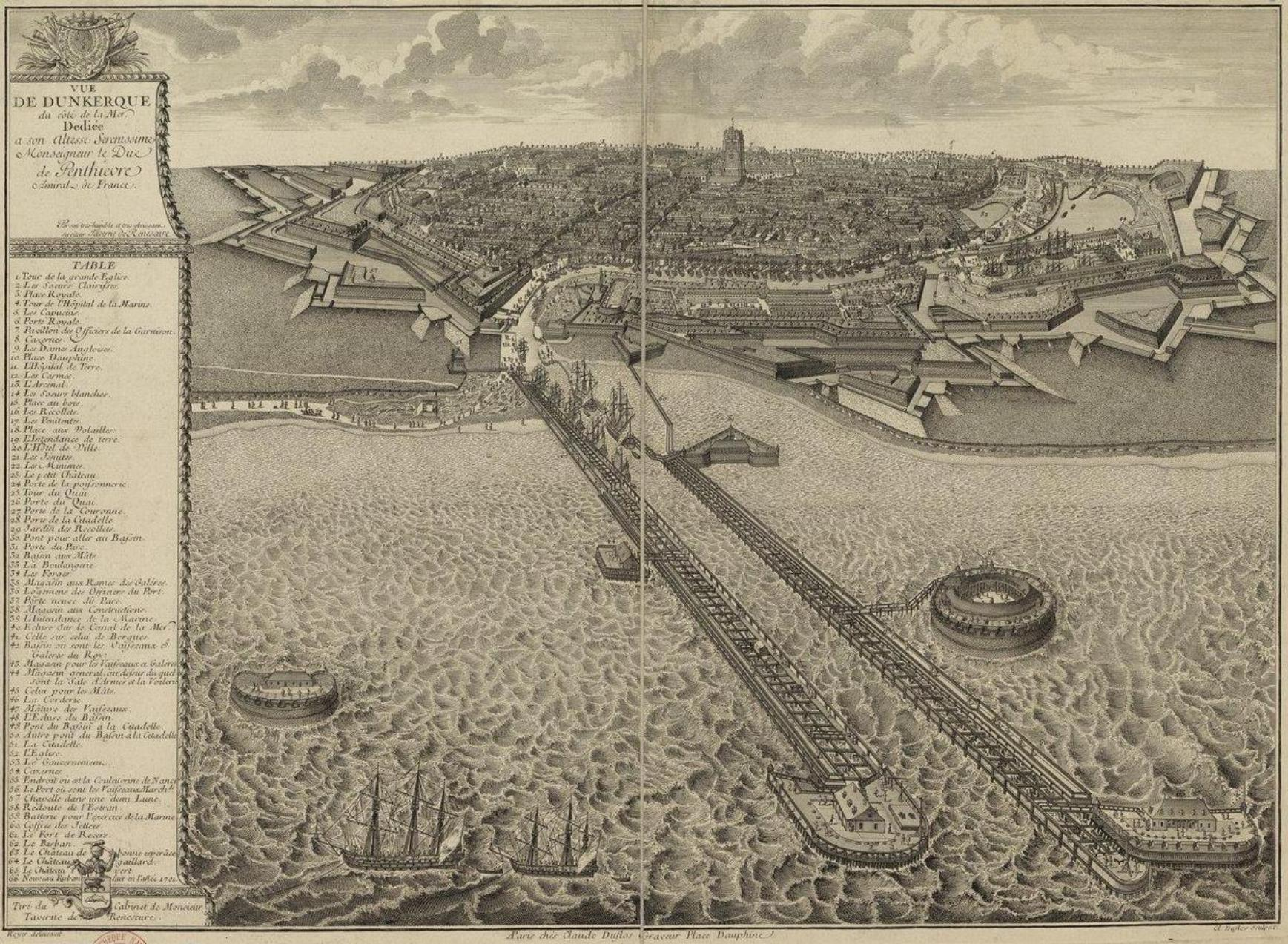
French privateer base of Dunkirk, ca 1710; Lascelles and Armstrong supervised the demolition of its port facilities

Lascelles was briefly recalled to Britain during the 1715 Jacobite Rising; in recognition of his service, he was made a burgess and guild brethren of Glasgow, a largely honorary title handed out to many others, including his relative Peregrine Lascelles. He returned to Dunkirk, replacing Armstrong as Deputy Quartermaster General in 1718. The Dunkirk merchants strongly resisted the degrading of their port, adding political considerations to the complex engineering issues of eliminating access from the harbour to the sea. Lascelles also acted as temporary Director of Engineers from 1720 to 1722 and deputy Surveyor-General of the Ordnance when Armstrong was absent; when he returned to England in 1725, he was exhausted.

In the next few years, new piers and harbour facilities were built at Dunkirk; the French government's need for peace had previously meant a degree of support for demolition operations but they now wanted to re-establish French naval capabilities in Northern France. Lascelles returned to Dunkirk in 1730 but by 1733 it was clear this was an impossible task and his mission there ended. At the beginning of the War of the Austrian Succession in 1740, he was asked to join the Cartagena Expedition led by Lord Cathcart; his duties in England made this impossible, while his request for the Colonelcy of a regiment in return was refused.

When Armstrong died in July 1742, Lascelles succeeded him as Chief Royal Engineer, whilst also being deputy to the Lieutenant-General of the Ordnance and visited the strategic port of Ostend in 1744 to assess its defences. As Inspector-general of Artillery, he attended discussions between the British and Dutch Republic on implementing the May 1745 convention on continuing the war in Flanders. The French followed victory at Fontenoy in June 1745 by capturing Ostend in August and by 1747 they held most of the Austrian Netherlands.

French success on land had been matched by British success at sea and the war ended with the Treaty of Aix-la-Chapelle in 1748; Lascelles resigned from his posts on 1 March 1750 and the following month was granted an annual life pension of £200. He moved back to Pontefract in Yorkshire, where he died on 1 November 1751.

== Sources ==
- Anderson, James, ed. (1925). The burgesses & guild brethren of Glasgow, 1573-1750. Skinner & Co for the Scottish Record Society.
- Atkinson, CT (1944). "A Flanders Sideshow; Hulst, 1747". Journal of the Society for Army Historical Research. 22 (89).
- Bromley, JS (1987). Corsairs and Navies, 1600–1760. Continnuum-3PL. ISBN 978-0907628774.
- Dalton, Charles (1904). English army lists and commission registers, 1661-1714 Volume V. Eyre and Spottiswood.
- Harding, Richard (2010). The Emergence of Britain's Global Naval Supremacy: The War of 1739-1748. Boydell Press. ISBN 978-1843835806.
- Moore, John Robert (1950). "Defoe, Steele, and the Demolition of Dunkirk". Huntington Library Quarterly. 13 (3): 279–302. doi:10.2307/3816138. JSTOR 3816138.
- Vetch, RH (2004). "Lascelles, Thomas (1670-1751\0". Oxford Dictionary of National Biography (online ed.). Oxford University Press. doi:10.1093/ref:odnb/16080. ISBN 978-0-19-861412-8. (Subscription, Wikipedia Library access or UK public library membership required.)

Military offices
Preceded by John Armstrong	Chief Royal Engineer; 1742–1751	Succeeded by William Skinner (in 1757)
Preceded by John Armstrong	Surveyor-General of the Ordnance; 1742–1750	Succeeded by Charles Frederick
