= Prince of Wales Lines =

Set of earthworks constructed in Gibraltar in 1756

Coordinates: 36°07′47″N 5°21′08″W

The Prince of Wales Lines were a set of earthworks constructed in Gibraltar in 1756 on the orders of Lord Tyrawley, during his term as Governor of Gibraltar. They consisted of a series of retrenchments for guns and muskets constructed between the glacis of the South Front to the New Mole, south of Gibraltar's urban area.

The ground between the South Front and Rosia Bay was seen as the weakest area of the fortifications of Gibraltar. Only 52 years earlier, the area had seen the British Royal Marines landing there during the capture of Gibraltar. Tyrawley put one of his aides, Captain Charles Rainsford, in charge of what proved to be a controversial project from the start. Rainsford was neither an engineer nor an expert in fortifications, but was a Coldstream Guardsman with an amateur interest in military architecture.

Tyrawley and Rainsford clashed repeatedly with Gibraltar's senior engineer, Colonel William Skinner of the Royal Engineers. They disagreed vehemently over where the new lines were sited and how they were constructed, among other things, with Tyrawley arguing for earthworks and Skinner championing solid stone revetments. Tyrawley considered that earthworks would be quicker and cheaper to build, and would not throw off dangerous splinters when hit by enemy shells. Skinner argued that Gibraltar's hot summer climate would cause the earthworks to crumble, while the heavy winter rains would wash them away.

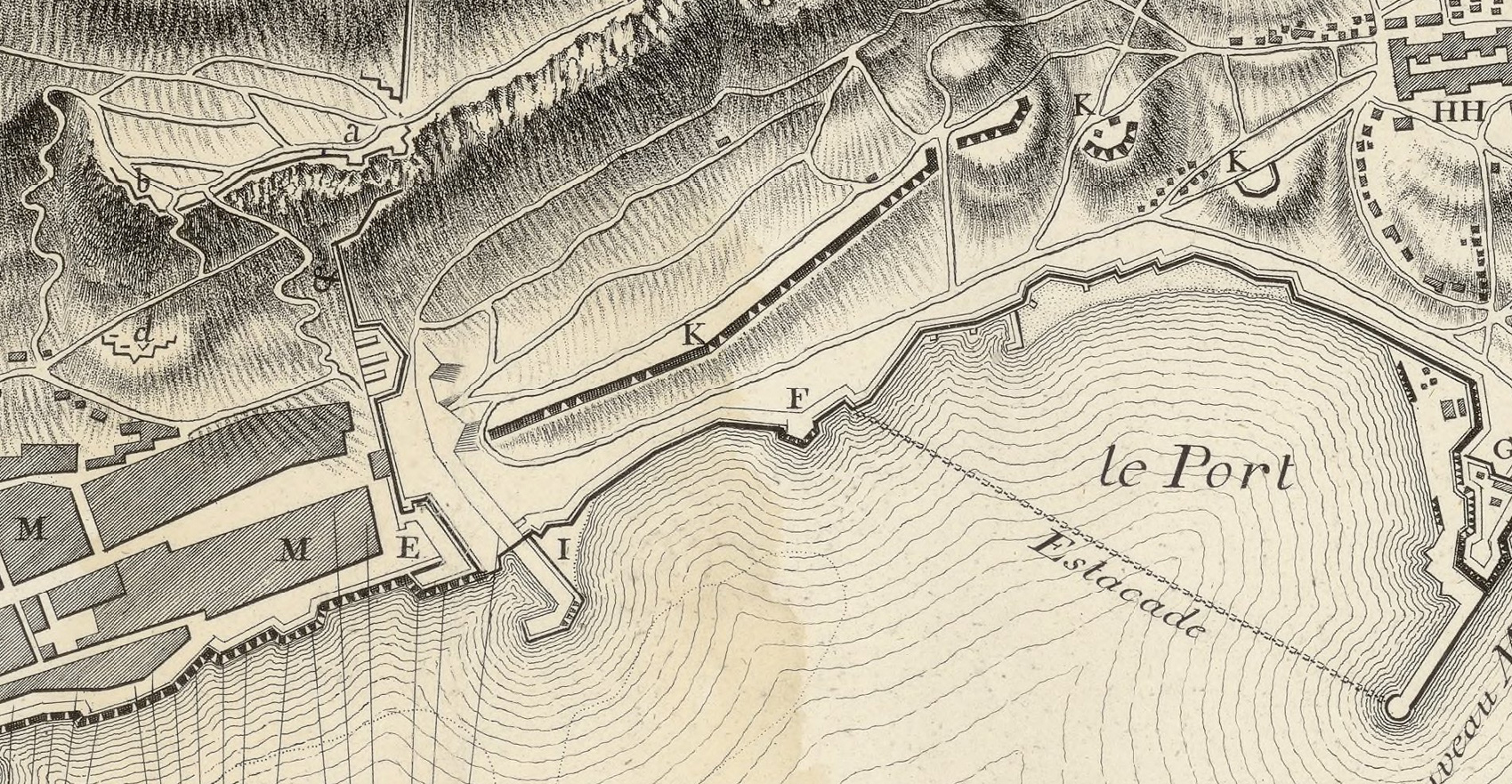
Map of the Prince of Wales Lines in 1782 (centre, marked with a "K")

Skinner also disagreed strongly with where the lines were to be constructed. He wrote:

The use of the retrenched line on the Red Sand Banks, I cannot pretend to determine, for if it is intended for the defence of the Sea Line in front, its height can only command to the bring of the parapet which hinders the view of the water at least 250 yards from the front. If intended as a retrenchment in case of a breach, it is of little use for it has no flanks and its face can only be defended from the new battery on the South Bastion.

Tyrawley nonetheless went ahead with the project, constructing it from earth as planned. Old barrels were used to provide support for the works and the glacis was made from a mound of the town's rubble. It was then compacted to form a solid mass hard enough, it was said, for the guns to be brought along the covered way without their wheels making an indentation on the ground. Laid out en cremaillère (in a stepwise fashion), the lines were broken at intervals by embrasures for batteries housing guns mounted in pairs. Batteries at the Flat Bastion and the demi-bastion above would provide additional support. The idea was that a defending force would occupy the trenches in the event of an enemy landing and drive off the invaders with volleys of canister or grape shot from 8-inch howitzers.

Skinner's concerns that the earthworks would not withstand the weather seemed at first to be misplaced, as three days of torrential rain in March 1757 caused little damage to the lines. However, in subsequent years the lines were washed away by further bad weather, though Tyrawley claimed that this could have been prevented if the earthworks had been coated with tapia, a kind of mortar made from sand and lime.

== Bibliography ==
- Hughes, Quentin; Migos, Athanassios (1995). Strong as the Rock of Gibraltar. Gibraltar: Exchange Publications. OCLC 48491998.
