= John Armstrong (British Army officer) =

British army officer and engineer (1674–1742)

Major-General John Armstrong FRS
- Portrait by James MacArdell, 1753
- Born: 31 March 1674; Ballyan, County Offaly
- Died: 15 April 1742 (aged 68); Tower of London, London
- Burial place: Church of St Peter ad Vincula, London
- Military career
- Allegiance: England; Great Britain
- Branch: English Army; British Army
- Service years: 1691–1741
- Rank: Major general
- Unit: Royal Regiment of Ireland
- Commands: Chief Royal Engineer (1714–1742); Surveyor-General of the Ordnance (1722–1742)
- Conflicts: Williamite War in Ireland; Nine Years War; War of the Spanish Succession; Battle of Cádiz (1702); Battle of Blenheim; Siege of Bouchain

Major-General John Armstrong, FRS (31 March 1674 – 15 April 1742) was a British army officer and engineer who served as Chief Royal Engineer and Surveyor-General of the Ordnance. He played a leading role in establishing the Royal Military Academy, Woolwich as a dedicated training academy for engineers.

== Life ==
John Armstrong was born on 31 March 1674 in the village of Ballyan, in what is now County Offaly in Ireland. He was the eldest son of Robert (c.1651–1716) and Lydia Armstrong (c.1649–1715), originally from the Scottish Borders and distantly related to the notorious Border reiver Johnnie Armstrong. He had two sisters, Lydia (1680–1715) and Elizabeth (1679-ca 1730); his brothers Samuel (1676–1710) and Michael (1678–1757) also served in the army.

In 1710, he married Anna Burroughs (ca 1690–1725) and they had five daughters, Lydia (1718–1775), Anne (1719–1783), Frances (1720–1763), Mary (1721–1790) and Priscilla (1725-?).

== Career ==
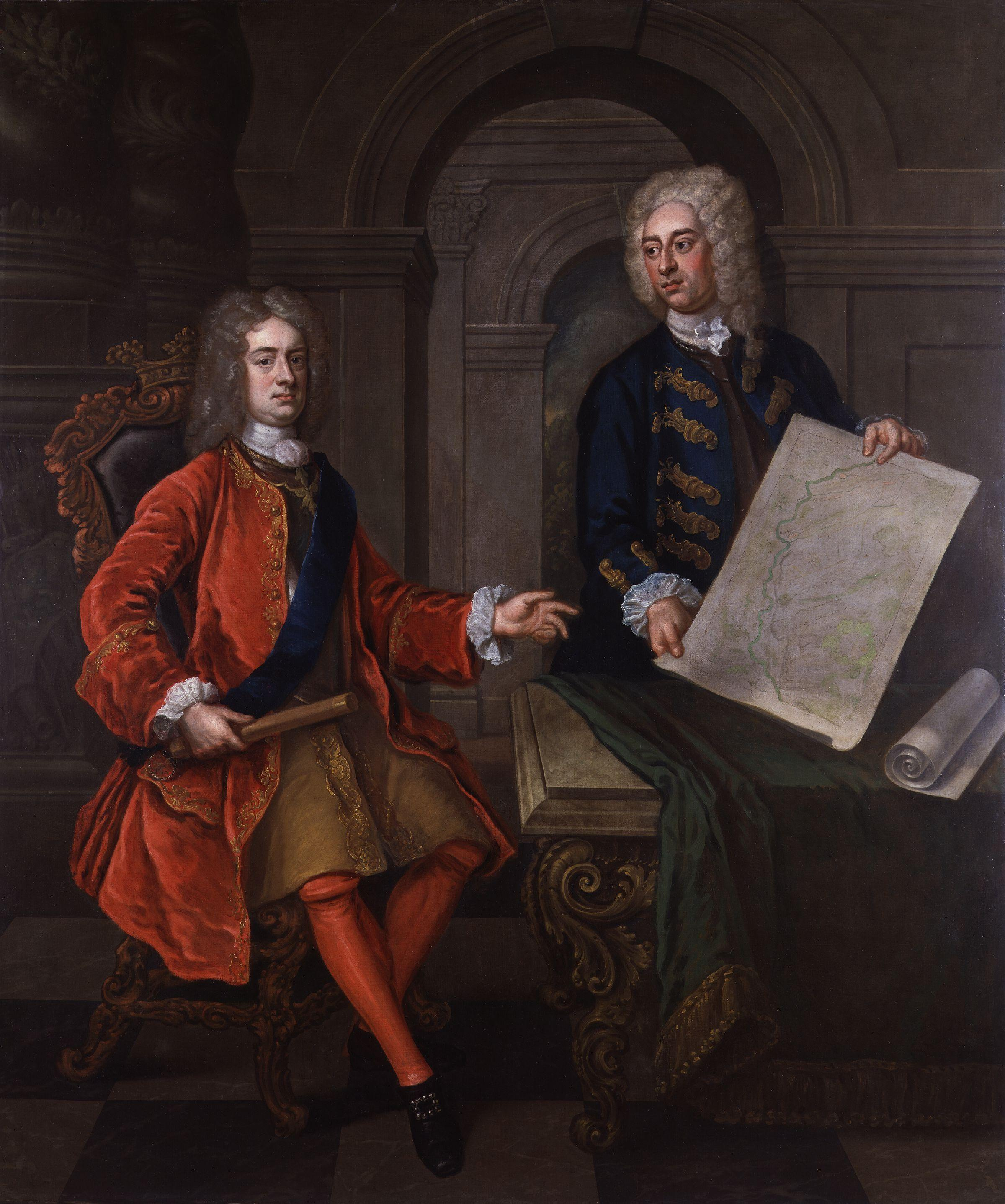
c. 1720 painting of Armstrong (right) and Marlborough discussing the siege of Bouchain

The 1688 Glorious Revolution sent James II into exile and in an attempt to regain his kingdoms, he landed in Ireland in March 1689, launching the Williamite War in Ireland; in 1691, Armstrong joined the Duke of Ormonde's Horse Guards, part of the Williamite army. Captured by Jacobite forces, he was released when the war ended with the October 1691 Treaty of Limerick and in 1695, he enrolled in his relative Philip Armstrong's troop, part of Wood's Regiment of Horse, later 3rd Dragoon Guards. After the Nine Years War ended with the Treaty of Ryswick in 1697, the regiment returned to England.

At the start of the War of the Spanish Succession, he served at Cadiz under Ormonde, who recommended him to Holcroft Blood (1660–1707), Marlborough's chief engineer. Armstrong served in the Flanders campaign, including Blenheim in 1704 and the Siege of Bouchain in 1711. He worked with fellow engineer and long-time acquaintance Thomas Lascelles and they remained close colleagues until Armstrong's death in 1742. He managed to retain his positions through the political struggles of 1712–1715 and was appointed Quartermaster-General to the Forces just before the war ended with the 1713 Peace of Utrecht.

The treaty included the provision that France 'level the fortifications of Dunkirk, block up the port and demolish the sluices that scour the harbour, (which) shall never be reconstructed.' For decades before and after, Dunkirk was a major privateer base for raiding British merchantmen, since it was possible to reach the North Sea in a single tide and escape Royal Navy patrols in the Channel. This made it a high-profile operation of great significance to the powerful London mercantile interest and in September 1713, Armstrong and his colleague Thomas Lascelles were appointed to supervise operations.

After the accession of George I in 1714, Marlborough was restored as Master-General of the Ordnance and initiated a series of reforms. Armstrong became Chief Royal Engineer, with his predecessor Michael Richards as Surveyor-General of the Ordnance; on his recommendation, the Ordnance Service was divided in 1716 into artillery and sappers or engineers, later the Royal Engineers and the Royal Artillery. In May, Armstrong was at The Foundery in Moorfields watching a demonstration of captured French cannon being recast when an explosion killed 17 of the 25 people present; he was one of the very few to escape injury and the accident led to the institution of the Royal Arsenal in Woolwich.

He returned to England in 1718 with Lascelles taking over at Dunkirk; in addition to his official duties, he was involved in multiple activities, becoming a Fellow of the Royal Society in May 1723. His proposals for improving port facilities at King's Lynn were included as an appendix to Thomas Badeslade's 1725 work 'History of the ancient and present state of the navigation of the port of King's Lyn.' In the 1720s, he designed and constructed a lake at Blenheim Palace, later replaced by a Capability Brown feature.

He was closely involved in setting up the Royal Arsenal and Royal Military Academy, Woolwich, served as Colonel of the Royal Regiment of Ireland from 1735 to 1742 and promoted Major-General in 1739. Late in 1741, he was taken ill at his office in the Tower of London where he died on 15 April 1742; he was buried in the chapel attached to the Tower, the Church of St Peter ad Vincula.

== Sources ==
- Bromley, JS (1987). Corsairs and Navies, 1600–1760. Continnuum-3PL. ISBN 978-0907628774.
- Burke, Bernard (1874). A Genealogical and Heraldic History of the Landed Gentry of Great Britain. Harrison, Pall Mall.;
- Gretton, g (1906). Campaigns and History of the Royal Irish Regiment from 1684 to 1902.
- Latcham, Paul (2004). "Armstrong, John (1674–1742)". Oxford Dictionary of National Biography (online ed.). Oxford University Press. doi:10.1093/ref:odnb/659. (Subscription, Wikipedia Library access or UK public library membership required.)
- Moore, John Robert (1950). "Defoe, Steele, and the Demolition of Dunkirk". Huntington Library Quarterly. 13 (3): 279–302. doi:10.2307/3816138. JSTOR 3816138.

Military offices
Preceded by New Post	Quartermaster-General to the Forces; 1712–1742	Succeeded by Humphrey Bland
Preceded by Michael Richards	Chief Royal Engineer; 1714–1742	Succeeded by Thomas Lascelles
Preceded by Michael Richards	Surveyor-General of the Ordnance; 1722–1742	Succeeded by Thomas Lascelles
Preceded by Sir Charles Hotham, 5th Baronet	Colonel of the Royal Regiment of Ireland; 1735–1742	Succeeded by John Mordaunt
