= Charles Richardson (British Army officer) =

British Army officer (1908–1994)

General Sir Charles Richardson GCB CBE DSO
- Lieutenant-General Richardson in 1962
- Born: 11 August 1908; Guernsey
- Died: 7 February 1994 (aged 85); Redhill, Surrey, England
- Military career
- Allegiance: United Kingdom
- Branch: British Army
- Service years: 1928–1971
- Rank: General
- Service number: 40407
- Unit: Royal Engineers
- Commands: Northern Command; Singapore District; Royal Military College of Science; 61st Infantry Brigade
- Conflicts: Second World War; Battle of France; Western Desert campaign; Tunisian campaign; Allied invasion of Sicily; Allied invasion of Italy; Operation Overlord; Western Allied invasion of Germany
- Awards: Knight Grand Cross of the Order of the Bath; Commander of the Order of the British Empire; Companion of the Distinguished Service Order; Mentioned in Despatches (2); Officer of the Legion of Merit (US)

General Sir Charles Leslie Richardson, GCB, CBE, DSO (11 August 1908 – 7 February 1994) was a senior British Army officer who saw service in the Second World War and reached high office in the 1950s.

A 1928 graduate of the Royal Military Academy, Woolwich, Richardson was commissioned into the Royal Engineers. He served in British India between 1931 and 1938. During the Second World War he graduated from the Staff College, Camberley, and served on the staff of the 4th Infantry Division in the Battle of France. He then went to the Middle East, where he was an instructor in logistics at the Staff College, Haifa, and a staff officer with the Special Operations Executive (SOE). He became the staff officer for plans the headquarters of the Eighth Army in June 1942 and was responsible for planning the deception operation codenamed Operation Bertram. Promoted to the acting rank of brigadier, he served on the staff of the Eighth Army in the Tunisian campaign and the Allied invasion of Sicily, on that of the US Fifth Army in the Italian campaign, and with that of the 21st Army Group in the campaign in North West Europe in 1944–1945.

After the war Richardson was with the British Control Commission in Berlin from 1945 to 1946 and the British Army of the Rhine (BAOR) from 1947 to 1948. He was appointed Commandant of the Royal Military College of Science at Shrivenham in 1955 and the General Officer Commanding of the Singapore District in 1958. He went on to become the first Director of Combat Development at the War Office in 1960 and Director General of Military Training in 1961. In this latter role he was credited with recognising the significance of the Special Air Service. In 1963 he became General Officer Commanding-in-Chief Northern Command and in 1965 the Quartermaster-General to the Forces. His final appointment was as Master-General of the Ordnance in 1966 before he retired in 1971. He was Chief Royal Engineer from 1972 to 1977.

== Early life ==
Charles Leslie Richardson was born in Guernsey on 11 August 1908, the oldest child and only son of Charles William Richardson, a Royal Artillery officer, and his wife, Eveline Adah née Wingrove. He had a younger sister. While his father was stationed in Mauritius, his mother and the two children lived in the French-speaking part of Switzerland, and he became fluent in French. His early education was at St Ronan's School, and when he left in 1922 he was awarded a scholarship to Wellington College, Berkshire.

Richardson then entered the Royal Military Academy, Woolwich, where he passed out first and was awarded the King's Medal for the cadet best qualified in military subjects. He was commissioned as a second lieutenant into the Royal Engineers on 30 August 1928. This was followed by further engineer training at the Royal School of Military Engineering in Chatham, Kent, where his instructors included Captain Eric Dorman-Smith, and then two years at Clare College, Cambridge, where he earned a first-class honours degree in engineering in the Mathematical Tripos.

== India ==
After graduating from Cambridge in 1931, Richardson was seconded to the Royal Bombay Sappers and Miners in British India. He joined its headquarters (HQ) in Kirkee, where newly-arrived lieutenants were taught Urdu. He was then posted to Bombay as assistant garrison engineer in the Military Engineering Services, which was responsible for civil engineering works, and was largely staffed by Indian civilians. After six weeks there he was sent to Mhow, where he enjoyed pigsticking, shooting sandgrouse, and horse riding. Richardson then became the garrison engineer in Nasirabad, where he attempted, unsuccessfully, to improve the water supply, and was in charge of improvements to the officers' bungalows there. In 1933 he returned to duty with the Royal Bombay Sappers and Miners in Quetta.

After leave in Britain, he returned to India as second in command of a field company in Kirkee. He was assigned to command a detachment of thirty sappers to Chitral, near the border with Afghanistan. The unit's annual training program included the construction of a permanent structure; Richardson chose to build a cantilevered cliff gallery roads to improve the track from Drosh to Lowari Pass. This drew upon the knowledge he had gained at Cambridge. The required stores had to be ordered six months in advance and carried by porters for 60 miles (97 km) over a 10,000-foot (3,000 m) saddle. While on this posting he took a preparatory course at Simla for the staff college examination.

== Second World War ==
Richardson returned to the United Kingdom in 1938, and became the assistant adjutant of the Royal Engineers training battalion at Chatham.After the outbreak of the Second World War in September 1939, he became the adjutant of the I Corps Troops Engineers, a Territorial Army formation from Manchester and Liverpool consisting of three field companies and a field park company that was assigned to the British Expeditionary Force in France. During the Phony War period it constructed fortifications along the border between France and Belgium.

In January 1940, Richardson was sent to the Staff College, Camberley, for an abbreviated wartime course. He returned to France on 1 May 1940, where he joined the staff of the 4th Infantry Division as its Deputy Assistant Adjutant General (DAAG), the staff officer responsible for personnel. After the Germans attacked on 10 May, the 4th Division became involved first in the advance in Belgium, and then in the retreat that culminated in the Dunkirk evacuation.

On 30 August 1940, Richardson boarded the battleship HMS Valiant, bound for the Middle East. He arrived at his destination, the Staff College, Haifa, in Palestine, where Dorman-Smith was the commandant and Freddie de Guingand was the chief instructor. Richardson was the only member of the faculty who had seen action in the war thus far, but he confessed that what had been learned thus far had been what not to do. He taught classes on logistics; his students included Captains Michael Carver and Geoffrey Baker.

=== Special Operations Executive ===
After nine months at the Staff College, Richardson expected to be assigned to an operational unit. Instead, he was posted to Cairo as the General Staff Officer, Grade 1 (GSO 1) for Operations with the Special Operations Executive (SOE), although he lacked experience in clandestine operations and military intelligence. In a letter home he wrote: "I am surrounded by mountebanks: the place is a madhouse, but there are no dull moments." A fundamental problem was that MI6, whose role was intelligence collection, wanted to conduct its business quietly, whereas SOE, engaged in sabotage, welcomed publicity, as it encouraged the resistance.

SOE worked in cooperation with the Long Range Desert Group and the Special Air Service, which carried out raids on German and Italian air bases. SOE missions to Greece and Yugoslavia depended on submarines provided by the Royal Navy, which gave SOE excellent support. Nonetheless, SOE built up its own small fleet of caïques for clandestine operations. Support from the Royal Air Force (RAF) was less forthcoming. Long range aircraft were required to reach Greece and Yugoslavia, but when three Consolidated B-24 Liberators were allocated for the task, the RAF lost them all when it diverted them to participate in an air raid on Benghazi. After Richardson confronted Air Vice Marshal Philip Wigglesworth over this, Wigglesworth attempted to have him sacked, but Richardson's superior, Lieutenant Colonel Terence Airey supported him. Richardson conducted one covert operation himself, travelling to Turkey in civilian clothes to deliver three radio sets to British agents.

=== Eighth Army ===
On 25 June 1942, Richardson became the (GSO 1) for the Plans at Eighth Army HQ; Brigadier Jock Whiteley was the Brigadier, General Staff (BGS), and there were three other GSO1s: Lieutenant-Colonels Hugh Mainwaring (Operations) and David Belchem (Staff Duties) and L. M. (Spud) Murphy (Intelligence). Whitely was replaced by de Guingand in July. The staff arrangements were confusing; General Sir Claude Auchinleck was both Commander-in-Chief Middle East and commander of the Eighth Army and Dorman-Smith was present as Deputy Chief of the General Staff (DCGS), creating two lines of authority. De Guingand persuaded Auchinleck and Dorman-Smith that the latter would be more useful back at General Headquarters (GHQ) in Cairo. On 15 August 1942, Auchinleck was succeeded as commander of the Eighth Army by Lieutenant-General Bernard Montgomery.

Richardson played a significant role in the Battle of El Alamein and was responsible for planning the deception operation codenamed Operation Bertram in particular. To convince the Germans and Italians that the attack would be in the south instead of the north, logistical activity, such as the placement of dumps and refuelling points, was faked, over two hundred dummy tanks, vehicles and guns were emplaced, and there was even a fake water pipeline constructed from non-returnable 4-gallon flimsy petrol tins. For his role in the battle, Richardson was made an officer of the Order of the British Empire. On 7 November, Mainwaring and Carver, his GSO2, were captured by a German rearguard while reconnoitring a new location for Eighth Army HQ, and Richardson succeeded him as GSO1 (Operations). On 15 April 1943, Montgomery sent de Guingand to Cairo to take charge of the planning for the Operation Husky, the Allied invasion of Sicily, and Richardson succeeded him as BGS, with the rank of brigadier. "In recognition of gallant and distinguished services in the Middle East", Richardson was appointed a Companion of the Distinguished Service Order. When the Eighth Army staff was reunited for Operation Husky, de Guingand resumed as chief of staff and Richardson became BGS (Ops).

=== Fifth Army ===
For the Allied invasion of Italy, Lieutenant General Mark W. Clark's US Fifth Army had both an American component, Major General Ernest J. Dawley's US VI Corps, and a British one, Lieutenant-General Sir Richard McCreery's British X Corps. A small British increment was therefore added to Fifth Army headquarters, and Richardson was nominated to lead it. Montgomery wrote him a personal letter:

You have been a member of our staff for a very long time and you will be greatly missed. But when appealed to by the Americans we had to send our best, and you are very much wanted in that show. I do not like the way things are shaping up in that "party"!!

Richardson had reservations about Clark's fitness to command, but he soon came to appreciate the talent of his chief of staff, Major General Alfred Gruenther. In the Battle of Salerno, the critical situation raised memories of Dunkirk, and Richardson prepared contingency plans for an evacuation, which were not needed. He remained with the Fifth Army through the Bernhardt Line fighting, the Battle of Monte Cassino and the Battle of Anzio. For his service, he was awarded the American Legion of Merit.

=== 21st Army Group ===
On 1 April 1944, Richardson joined the staff of the 21st Army Group as BGS (Plans). His G (Plans) branch was charged with long-range planning in order that resources would be available to meet foreseeable contingencies. The appreciation it drew up before D-Day highlighted the tactical importance of the Normandy bocage country and the likelihood that the advance would be slower than forecast. He worked closely with the logistical planners, Major-General Miles Graham and Colonel Oliver Poole. Shortly before D-Day, he was given the additional assignment of liaison with the Allied Air Forces, which he performed during the first weeks of the campaign in Normandy. He helped arrange air support for tactical and airborne operations, and he met with Air Chief Marshal Sir Arthur Harris to arrange the support of RAF Bomber Command on 7 July for Operation Charnwood. Later in the year his branch examined the problems involved in crossing the Rhine, which occurred in March 1945. For his services in North West Europe, he was twice mentioned in despatches and advanced to Commander in the Order of the British Empire.

== Post-war ==
After the war in Europe ended, Richardson served as military assistant to the Deputy Military Governor of the British Zone, General Sir Ronald Weeks. In July 1945, he became the chief of the British military division of the quadripartite Control Commission that governed Berlin. He spent two days observing the Nuremberg trials of German war criminals. A ruptured Achilles tendon ended his tenure in Berlin, and after a prolonged stay in hospital he joined Rear-Admiral Charles Lambe and Air Vice Marshal Edmund Hudleston in writing British Strategy 1946–61, a forecast of size and shape of the defence forces in the quarter century to come, taking into account anticipated advances in technology, particularly nuclear weapons.

On 10 May 1947, Richardson married Audrey Elizabeth Styles, the widow of an RAF officer, Wing Commander Hubert Mortimer Styles, and the daughter of a British Army officer, Captain Conrad Reginald Eric Jorgensen. They had two children: a son and a daughter, and he also acquired a stepdaughter from his wife's previous marriage. He reverted to his substantive rank of lieutenant-colonel to command an engineer regiment in the British Army of the Rhine (BAOR) from 1947 to 1948. He then became a brigadier again, serving in Egypt as BGS (Staff Duties) with the Middle East Land Forces from May 1948 to November 1950, and in the UK as Brigadier A/Q on the staff of Western Command from January 1952 to April 1953. He then become the commander of the 61st Infantry Brigade, the infantry brigade of the 6th Armoured Division from June 1953 to 11 April 1955. Since his experience in command was limited, he relied heavily on his brigade major, Major Ian Gill, who had commanded an armoured squadron in action, and Gill's successor, Major Michael Gow, who had served with him in Berlin.

Richardson was appointed Commandant of the Royal Military College of Science at Shrivenham with the rank of major-general on 18 May 1955, following the sudden death of his predecessor, Major-General Edwyn Cobb. The Chief of the Imperial General Staff, Field Marshal Sir John Harding, told him that his assignment was "to make science fashionable in the army". He was General Officer Commanding of Singapore District from 29 March 1958 to 18 February 1960. He went on to become the first Director of Combat Development at the War Office from July 1960 to February 1961 and Director General of Military Training from February 1961 to 11 April 1963. From 18 April 1963 to 1 November 1964 he was General Officer Commanding-in-Chief Northern Command. On 20 January 1965 he became Quartermaster-General to the Forces. In this role he oversaw the logistical arrangements for Britain's withdrawal from East of Suez. His final appointment was as Master-General of the Ordnance on 12 December 1966. He was made a Knight Commander of the Order of the Bath in the 1962 New Year Honours, and was advanced to the Knight Grand Cross of the order in the 1967 New Year Honours. He was aide de camp to the queen from 1967 to 1970, colonel commandant of the Royal Army Ordnance Corps from 1967 to 1971, and Chief Royal Engineer from 1972 to 1977. He retired from the Army on 6 April 1971.

== Later life ==
In retirement, Richardson lived in Betchworth, Surrey, where he worked as a consultant to International Computers Limited from 1971 to 1976. He was the treasurer of the Kitchener National Memorial Fund from 1971 to 1981, and the chairman of the Gordon Boys' School from 1977 to 1987. He wrote three books: an autobiography, Flashback (1985); a biography of de Guingand, Send for Freddie (1987); and one of Ian Jacob, From Churchill's Secret Circle to the B.B.C. (1991).

Richardson died from a heart attack at East Surrey Hospital in Redhill, Surrey, on 7 February 1994. A memorial service was held in the chapel of the Royal Hospital Chelsea on 27 April 1994. His banner as a Knight Grand Cross of the Order of the Bath hangs in St Michael's Church in Betchworth.

== Dates of rank ==
Second lieutenant	Lieutenant	Captain	Major	Lieutenant-Colonel
30 August 1928	30 August 1931	1 August 1938	27 April 1940 (acting) 27 July 1940 (temporary); 27 December 1940	27 September 1941 (acting); 27 December 1941 (temporary); 1 November 1943

Colonel	Brigadier	Major-general	Lieutenant-general	General
1 May 1943 (acting); 1 November 1943 (temporary); 11 August 1949	1 May 1943 (acting); 1 November 1943 (temporary); 1 January 1955	18 May 1955 (temporary); 24 April 1956	27 February 1961	20 January 1965 (local); 21 September 1965

== Bibliography ==
- Richardson, Charles (1985). Flashback: A Soldier's Story. London: Kimber. ISBN 978-0-7183-0567-3. OCLC 17775714.
- Richardson, Charles (1987). Send for Freddie: Story of Montgomery's Chief of Staff Major-General Sir Francis De Guingand. London: Kimber. ISBN 978-0-7183-0641-0. OCLC 17622096.
- Richardson, Charles (1991). From Churchill's Secret Circle to the BBC: The Biography of Lieutenant General Sir Ian Jacob GBE CB DL. Brassey's. ISBN 978-0-08-037692-9. OCLC 494162074.

== Notes ==
Military offices
Preceded by Edwyn Cobb	Commandant of the Royal Military College of Science; 1955−1958	Succeeded by John Hackett
Preceded by Sir Charles Jones	GOC-in-C Northern Command; 1963–1964	Succeeded by Sir Geoffrey Musson
Preceded by Sir Gerald Lathbury	Quartermaster-General to the Forces; 1965–1966	Succeeded by Sir Alan Jolly
Preceded by Sir Charles Jones	Master-General of the Ordnance; 1966–1971	Succeeded by Sir Noel Thomas
Honorary titles
Preceded by Sir Charles Jones	Chief Royal Engineer; 1972–1977	Succeeded by Sir David Willison
