= John Dunt =

Vice Admiral Sir John Dunt KCB
- Born: 14 August 1944 (age 82)
- Military career
- Allegiance: United Kingdom
- Branch: Royal Navy
- Service years: 1963 - 2000
- Rank: Vice Admiral
- Commands: HMS Defiance
- Awards: Knight Commander of the Order of the Bath

Vice Admiral Sir John Hugh Dunt KCB (born 14 August 1944) is a former Royal Navy officer who ended his naval career as Chief of Fleet Support.

== Naval career ==
Educated at Duke of York School in Nairobi, Dunt joined the Royal Navy as a cadet at the Britannia Royal Naval College in 1963. He was given command of the maintenance base HMS Defiance in 1989. He became Director of Defence Systems at the Ministry of Defence in 1991, Director General of Fleet Support (Operations & Plans) in 1993 and Deputy Chief of the Defence Staff (Systems) in 1995. He went on to be Chief of Fleet Support in 1997 before he retired in 2000.

In retirement he became Chairman of the Armed Forces Memorial Trust, the body responsible for building and managing the Armed Forces Memorial in Staffordshire and chairman of the board of governors for The Royal Star and Garter Homes, a charity offering nursing and therapeutic care to ex-Service men and women. He lives in Liss in Hampshire.

Military offices
Preceded by Malcolm Rutherford	Deputy Chief of the Defence Staff (Systems); 1995–1997	Succeeded by Sir Edmund Burton
Preceded by Sir Toby Frere	Chief of Fleet Support; 1997-2000	Succeeded by Brian Perowne
