= Roger Austin =

Royal Air Force air marshal

Sir Roger Austin
- Born: 9 March 1940 (age 86)
- Military career
- Allegiance: United Kingdom
- Branch: Royal Air Force
- Service years: 1957–97
- Rank: Air Marshal
- Commands: Royal Air Force College Cranwell (1989–92); RAF Chivenor (1980–82); No. 233 Operational Conversion Unit (1974–77); No. 4 Squadron (1969–70); No. 54 Squadron (1969)
- Awards: Knight Commander of the Order of the Bath; Air Force Cross

Air Marshal Sir Roger Mark Austin, KCB, AFC, FRAeS (born 9 March 1940) is a retired Royal Air Force officer who became Deputy Chief of Defence Staff (Systems).

== Flying career ==
Educated at King Alfred's Grammar School, Austin was commissioned into the Royal Air Force in 1957. He became commanding officer of No. 54 Squadron in 1969, commanding officer of No. 233 Officer Conversion Unit in 1974 and Personal Staff Officer to the Air Officer Commanding RAF Strike Command in 1977. He went on to be Station Commander at RAF Chivenor in 1980, a staff officer at RAF Strike Command in 1982 and Director of Operational Requirements at the Ministry of Defence in 1984. After that he became Air Officer in charge of the Central Tactics and Trials Organisation 1987, Director-General Aircraft in 1987 and Commandant of the Royal Air Force College Cranwell in 1989. His final appointments were as Deputy Chief of the Defence Staff (Systems) in 1992, Controller Aircraft in 1994 and Deputy Chief of Defence Procurement (Operations) in 1995 before retiring in 1997.

In retirement he worked as a defence consultant for various companies including Serco Defence. He also became National President of the Royal British Legion.

Military offices
Preceded by Sir Anthony Mullens	Deputy Chief of the Defence Staff (Systems); 1992–1994	Succeeded by Malcolm Rutherford
