= Barry Wilson (Royal Navy officer) =

Vice-Admiral Sir Barry Wilson KCB
- Born: 5 June 1936
- Died: 29 August 2018 (aged 82)
- Military career
- Allegiance: United Kingdom
- Branch: Royal Navy
- Rank: Vice-Admiral
- Commands: HMS Mohawk; HMS Cardiff
- Awards: Knight Commander of the Order of the Bath

Vice-Admiral Sir Barry Nigel Wilson KCB (5 June 1936 – 29 August 2018) was a senior Royal Navy officer.

== Naval career ==
Educated at St Edward's School, Oxford and Britannia Royal Naval College, Wilson became commanding officer of the frigate HMS Mohawk in 1973 before becoming the first captain of the destroyer HMS Cardiff in 1978. He went on to be Director of Navy Plans in 1983, Flag Officer Sea Training in 1985 and Assistant Chief of Defence Staff (Programmes) in 1987. His last appointment was as Deputy Chief of the Defence Staff (Programmes and Personnel) in 1989 before retiring in 1992.

In retirement he became chairman of SSAFA Forces Help.

He died on 29 August 2018 at the age of 82.

== Family ==
In 1961 he married Elizabeth Ann Hardy; they had one son and one daughter. She died and in 2016 he married Georgina Doyle who survived him but died in 2026.

Military offices
Preceded by Michael Livesay	Flag Officer Sea Training; 1985–1987	Succeeded by John Coward
Preceded by Sir David Parry-Evans	Deputy Chief of the Defence Staff (Programmes and Personnel); 1989–1992	Succeeded by Sir Thomas Boyd-Carpenter
