= Anthony Mullens =

British Army Lieutenant General (1936–2009)

Lieutenant-General Sir Anthony Mullens KCB OBE
- Born: 10 May 1936
- Died: 27 November 2009 (aged 73)
- Military career
- Allegiance: United Kingdom
- Branch: British Army
- Service years: 1956–1992
- Rank: Lieutenant-General
- Commands: 1st Armoured Division; 7th Armoured Brigade; 4th/7th Royal Dragoon Guards
- Conflicts: Operation Banner
- Awards: Knight Commander of the Order of the Bath; Officer of the Order of the British Empire

Lieutenant-General Sir Anthony Richard Guy Mullens, KCB, OBE (10 May 1936 – 27 November 2009) was a British Army officer who served as Deputy Chief of the Defence Staff (Systems) from 1989 to 1992.

== Military career ==
Educated at Eton College and the Royal Military Academy Sandhurst, Mullens was commissioned into the 4th/7th Royal Dragoon Guards in 1956. In 1972, as chief of staff of the 8th Infantry Brigade, he handled the planning for Operation Motorman, which led to the removal of the barricades in Derry. He was given command of his regiment, at that time based in Germany, in 1976. He was appointed commander of the 7th Armoured Brigade in 1980, Deputy Military Secretary in 1982 and General Officer Commanding 1st Armoured Division in 1985. He went on to be Assistant Chief of the Defence Staff (Operational Requirements) in 1987, and Deputy Chief of the Defence Staff (Systems) in 1989. He retired in 1992.

Mullens was also Colonel of the Royal Dragoon Guards.

In retirement he became an Associate of Varley Walker & Partners, a firm of consultants.

== Family ==
In 1964 Mullens married Dawn Pease; they had no children.

Military offices
Preceded by David Thorne	General Officer Commanding 1st Armoured Division; 1985–1987	Succeeded by Richard Swinburn
Preceded by Sir Jeremy Black	Deputy Chief of the Defence Staff (Systems); 1989–1992	Succeeded by Sir Roger Austin
