= William Skinner (British Army officer) =

British military engineer

Lieutenant-General William Skinner
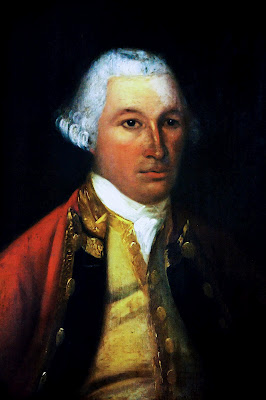
- Portrait of Skinner, c. 1730
- Born: 1 June 1700; St. Kitts
- Died: 25 December 1780 (aged 80); Greenwich, London
- Military career
- Allegiance: (Kingdom of Great Britain) Great Britain
- Branch: Engineer
- Service years: 1719 to 1780
- Rank: Lieutenant-General
- Commands: Chief Royal Engineer 1757 to 1780
- Conflicts: Anglo-Spanish War (1727–1729); Siege of Gibraltar; Seven Years' War 1756–1763

Lieutenant-General William Skinner (1700 – 25 December 1780) was Chief Royal Engineer of Great Britain from 1757 until his death in 1780. He is best known for his work on the fortifications of Menorca and Gibraltar although he considered his work on Fort George to be his "monument".

== Life ==
Skinner was born in St. Kitts in 1700; his parents Thomas and Elizabeth died when he was young and he was adopted by his aunt, Mrs Lambert. She remarried Captain Talbot Edwards, chief engineer in Barbados and the Leeward Islands, who was later appointed Deputy Chief Engineer of Great Britain. He was educated in Paris and Vienna.

== Career ==
Skinner was accepted as a practitioner engineer on 11 May 1719. The next few years were spent working on defences in Devonport, Menorca and Gibraltar; his survey of the peninsula proved of great value during the 1727 Thirteenth Siege of Gibraltar where he was rewarded with additional pay for his achievements. He was promoted steadily serving eventually as Director of engineering in Gibraltar.

In 1746 he was sent to Scotland where the government intended to increase the fortifications now that the Jacobite Rebellion had been ended. In 1751, he began work on Fort George which cost over 100,000 pounds and was made to Skinner's design. Skinner was to refer to the fort as his "monument" and would manage every detail which John Adam oversaw as the main contractor.

James O'Hara, 2nd Baron Tyrawley became Governor of Gibraltar in 1756 and set about improving the fortifications. These changes came under the notice and criticism of Lord George Sackville and Skinner wrote a report describing their inefficiency and arbitrariness. The two of them attended the House of Commons in 1758 where O'Hara harangued Skinner who took the anger in good humour. There appears to have been no long term damage as O'Hara was given the rank of field marshal in 1763.

Skinner died in Greenwich still working on Christmas Day 1780. His widow, Margaret, and his granddaughter both received exceptional annuities as there was some regret that Skinner had not been as well as he might have been. Despite spending huge sums his personal wealth at his death was a single house and a £500 annuity. Skinner's son was drowned in 1861 but his grandson, William Campbell Skinner was a successful American engineer.

Military offices
Preceded by Thomas Lascelles (office vacant in 1751)	Chief Royal Engineer; 1757–1781	Succeeded by James Bramham
