= Ian McIntosh (Royal Navy officer) =

Vice-Admiral Sir Ian McIntosh KBE CB DSO DSC
- Born: 11 October 1919; Melbourne, Australia
- Died: 31 July 2003 (aged 83); Portsmouth, England
- Military career
- Allegiance: United Kingdom
- Branch: Royal Navy
- Service years: 1938 - 1973
- Rank: Vice-Admiral
- Commands: HMS Sceptre; HMS Alderney; HMS Aeneas; HMS Victorious
- Conflicts: World War II
- Awards: Knight Commander of the Order of the British Empire; Companion of the Order of the Bath; Distinguished Service Order; Distinguished Service Cross

Vice-Admiral Sir Ian Stewart McIntosh, KBE, CB, DSO, DSC (11 October 1919 – 31 July 2003) was a Royal Navy officer who became Deputy Chief of the Defence Staff (Operational Requirements).

== Background ==
McIntosh was born in Melbourne, Australia in 1919. He was educated at Geelong Grammar School.

== Naval career ==
McIntosh joined the Royal Navy in 1938 and served in World War II. By the end of 1940 he had been promoted to sub-lieutenant and volunteered for service in submarines.

In March 1941 he joined the passenger ship Britannia at Liverpool, bound for a posting with the First Submarine Flotilla based in Alexandria, Egypt. On the morning of 25 March Britannia was sunk by gunfire from the German raider Thor approximately 700 miles west of Freetown, Sierra Leone. McIntosh took command of Lifeboat No. 7 with 82 survivors on board - 26 more than the boat was rated for - and successfully navigated 1,500 miles in 23 days to neutral Brazil. For this remarkable feat he was awarded the military MBE, normally reserved for senior ranks.

He served aboard the submarines HMS Porpoise and HMS Thrasher earning the Distinguished Service Cross for his service in the latter in 1942. As commanding officer of the submarine HMS Sceptre he sank almost 15,000 tons of enemy shipping and took part in Operation Source, the attacks on heavy German warships in Norwegian waters by towed midget submarines. He commanded the submarine HMS Alderney from 1946, the submarine HMS Aeneas from 1950 and then the aircraft carrier HMS Victorious in the 1960s. He became Director-General Weapons (Naval) at the Ministry of Defence in 1969 and Deputy Chief of the Defence Staff (Operational Requirements) in 1970 with the promotion to vice admiral on 20 November 1970, before retiring in 1973.

In retirement he became an executive search consultant with Alexander Hughes & Associates.

== Personal life and death ==
In 1943, he married Elizabeth Rosemary Rasmussen; they had three sons and one daughter (who died).

McIntosh died at Queen Alexandra Hospital in Portsmouth on 31 July 2003.

Military offices
Preceded by Sir Noel Thomas	Deputy Chief of the Defence Staff (Operational Requirements); 1971–1973	Succeeded by Sir Michael Giddings
