= Thomas Boyd-Carpenter =

British Army general

Lieutenant-General The Honourable Sir Thomas Boyd-Carpenter KBE
- Born: 16 June 1938 (age 88)
- Military career
- Allegiance: United Kingdom
- Branch: British Army
- Service years: 1957–1996
- Rank: Lieutenant-General
- Commands: 1st Battalion Scots Guards; 24th Infantry Brigade
- Conflicts: Malayan Emergency; Indonesia–Malaysia confrontation
- Awards: Knight Commander of the Order of the British Empire

Lieutenant-General Sir Thomas Patrick John Boyd-Carpenter, KBE (born 16 June 1938) is a former British Army officer who served as Deputy Chief of the Defence Staff (Programmes and Personnel).

== Early life ==
Boyd-Carpenter is the son of John Archibald Boyd-Carpenter, Baron Boyd-Carpenter and Margaret Mary, daughter of Lieutenant Colonel George Leslie Hall, of the Royal Engineers.

== Military career ==
In 1957, Boyd-Carpenter was commissioned into the Scots Guards. He was invested as a Member of the Order of the British Empire in 1973. He became commanding officer of 1st Battalion Scots Guards in 1979, Commander of 24th Infantry Brigade in 1983 and director, Defence Policy at the Ministry of Defence in 1985. He went on to Chief of Staff at Headquarters British Army of the Rhine in 1988, Assistant Chief of the Defence Staff (Programmes) in 1989 and Deputy Chief of the Defence Staff (Programmes and Personnel) in 1992 before retiring in 1996.

== Retirement ==
In retirement, he became chairman of the Kensington & Chelsea and Westminster Heath Authority and then chairman of the Moorfields Eye Hospital NHS Foundation Trust. He also became President of the Berkshire Royal British Legion.

== Coat of arms ==
Boyd-Carpenter's inherited Arms are blazoned "Paly of six, argent and gules, on a chevron azure, 3 cross crosslets or." Crest, on a wreath a globe in a frame all or. Supporters, two horses, party-perfess, embattled argent and gules. Motto: "Per Acuta Belli" (Through the Asperities of War).

Military offices
Preceded by Sir Barry Wilson	Deputy Chief of the Defence Staff (Programmes and Personnel); 1992–1996	Succeeded by Sir Peter Squire
