= List of Légion d'honneur recipients by name (R) =

The French government gives out the Legion of Honour awards, to both French and foreign nationals, based on a recipient's exemplary services rendered to France, or to the causes supported by France. This award is divided into five distinct categories (in ascending order), i.e. three ranks: Knight, Officer, Commander, and two titles: Grand Officer and Grand Cross. Knight is the most common and is awarded for either at least 20 years of public service or acts of military or civil bravery. The rest of the categories have a quota for the number of years of service in the category below before they can be awarded. The Officer rank requires a minimum of eight years as a Knight, and the Commander, the highest civilian category for a non-French citizen, requires a minimum of five years as an Officer. The Grand Officer and the Grand Cross are awarded only to French citizens, and each requires three years' service in their respective immediately lower rank. The awards are traditionally published and promoted on 14 July.

The following is a non-exhaustive list of recipients of the Legion of Honour awards, since the first ceremony in May 1803. 2,550 individuals can be awarded the insignia every year. The total number of awards is close to 1 million (estimated at 900,000 in 2021, including over 3,000 Grand Cross recipients), with some 92,000 recipients alive today. Only until 2008 was gender parity achieved amongst the yearly list of recipients, with the total number of women recipients since the award's establishment being only 59 at the end of the second French empire and only 26,000 in 2021.

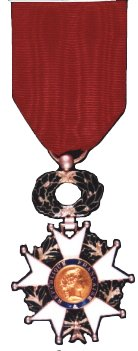

Recipient	Dates (birth – death)	General work, and reason for the recognition	Award Category (Date)
Sitiveni Rabuka	1948 – Present	Former Prime Minister of Fiji. Recognised for saving a French officer during an attack on the UN Headquarters in Lebanon in 1980.	TBA (1980)
Edson Raff	1907 – 2003	United States Army officer	
Maryse Rageul	1898 – 1952	French Air Corp Captain	Commander
Rainier III, Prince of Monaco	1949 – 2005	Prince of Monaco	Grand Cross
Joseph Ralston	1943 – Current		
Seewoosagur Ramgoolam	1900 – 1985		
Adil Rami		World Cup winning footballer	
Fidel Valdez Ramos	1928 – Present	Filipino general and politician	
Charlotte Rampling			
Bertram Ramsay			
Axel Rappe	1838 – Present		
Jean Raspail	1838 – Present	Novelist and journalist	TBA (1983)
Satyajit Ray		Film maker and artist from India.	
Robert Redford		American actor	
Richard Redgrave		British artist and administrator	
Willie Redmond			
Pierre-Joseph Redouté	1759 – 1840	French painter	
Major Gordon Michael Reeves	1912 – 2003	Major in British Army during World War II, liaison officer on General Koenig's staff in North Africa	
Suzanne Reichenberg	1853 – 1924	French actress	Chevalier
William Edward Moyses Reilly			
Jean Rémy	1899 – 1955	French colonel, Companion of the Liberation during World War II	Grand Officier
Ernest Renan			
Louis Renault			
Rosalie Rendu			
Géraud Réveilhac	1851 – 1937	Général de division of World War I	Grand Officier
Òscar Ribas Reig	1936 – 2020	Former Prime Minister of Andorra	
Jacqueline de Ribes	1929 – Present	French socialite and fashion designer	
Patrick Ricard	1945 – 2012	Entrepreneur	Commander (13 July 2007)
Robert C. Richardson Jr.			
Frances "Rusty" Rice	1920 – Present	American US Army Nurse in Bastogne, France during the "Bulge" WWII	Knight (27 December 2014)
William Thomas Rickard	1828 – 1905	QMS British Royal Navy. Recognised for his gallantry in Crimea	Knight (1854 - 1856)
Edward Vernon Rickenbacker	1890 – 1973	American captain. Recognised for his U.S. Army Air Service during World War I	
René Riffaud	1898 – 2007	Tunisian veteran of World War I	
Antoine Rigaudeau			
Frédéric Rimbaud	1814 – 1878	Captain of Chasseurs, father of the poet, Arthur Rimbaud	
Eric Ripert			
Jean-Pierre Rives		Captain of the national rugby union team, sculptor	
Jeanne Robert		Member of the French Resistance	
William Roberts (veteran)			
Thomas Bilbe Robinson			
Russell M. Robinson		WWII B-24 Pilot, 8th AF. Awarded Roanoke, VA USA, by the French Gen. Military Attache US	TBA (5 June 2019)
Yves Rocard			
David Rockefeller			
John D. Rockefeller Jr.			
Henryk Rodakowski			
Auguste Rodin			
George Rodocanachi			
Pierre Louis Roederer			
Jacques Rogge			
William Allen Rogers (W.A. Rogers)	1854 – 1931	American Illustrator (famous for Uncle Sam cartoons in the New York Herald during WWI)	
Felix Rohatyn			
Paul Rohmer	1876 – 1977	French physician, Officier of the Légion d'honneur	
Manfred Rommel	1928 – Present	German politician	
Maurice Rose			
Charles Rosenthal	1875 – 1954	Australian World War 1 general	
Marie-Thérèse Rossel			
Gioachino Rossini			
Claudia Roth			
Alphonse James de Rothschild			
Alfred de Rothschild			
James Mayer de Rothschild			
Marie-Hélène de Rothschild			
Col. Richard de Roussy de Sales	1905 – 1994	Recognised for his service with the French Resistance in World War II.	
Joseph Rovan			
Alex Rowe	1966 – Present	British national serving in the French Foreign Legion	
Stefan Rowecki			
JK Rowling			
Norman Richard Rudd	1922 – Present	Recognised for his military service in the defence of France and French territories (1939 - 1945).	
James Earl Rudder			
Sir Edward Ruggles-Brise, 1st Baronet			
Bruce Ruxton			
Nano Ružin			
Edward Rydz-Śmigły			

== See also ==
- Legion of Honour
- List of Legion of Honour recipients by name
- List of foreign recipients of Legion of Honour by name
- List of foreign recipients of the Legion of Honour by country
- List of British recipients of the Legion of Honour for the Crimean War
- Legion of Honour Museum
- Ribbons of the French military and civil awards
- War Cross (France)
