= 1st Royal Tank Regiment =

Armoured regiment of the British Army

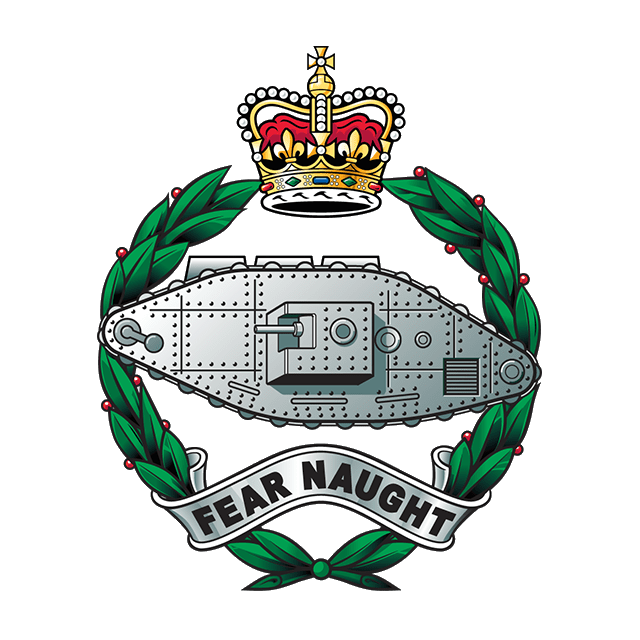
- Cap badge of the Royal Tank Regiment.
- Active: 28 July 1917–August 2014
- Country: United Kingdom
- Branch: British Army
- Type: Armoured
- Role: Div Troops/Land Warfare training
- Size: One regiment
- Part of: Royal Armoured Corps
- Garrison/HQ: Warminster, Wiltshire. RAF Honington
- Motto: Fear Naught
- March: Lippe Detmold; Quick: My Boy Willie; Slow: The Royal Tank Regiment Slow March
- Anniversaries: Cambrai, 20 November
- Battle honours: see Battle Honours

Commanders
- Colonel-in-Chief: HM The Queen
- Notable commanders: Hugh Elles; Michael Carver, Baron Carver

Insignia
- Tactical Recognition Flash
- Tartan: Hunting Rose (Pipers kilts and plaids)

The 1st Royal Tank Regiment (1 RTR) was an armoured regiment of the British Army. It is part of the Royal Tank Regiment, itself part of the Royal Armoured Corps and operationally under 12th Armoured Infantry Brigade.

== History ==
=== Formation ===
The regiment was originally formed as A Company, Heavy Section, Machine Gun Corps in May 1916 during the First World War (1914–1918). It took part in the first ever tank offensive in 1916 and saw action on the Western Front again in the Battle of Cambrai in November 1917 and later in the Hundred Days Offensive. Remaining active in the army during the interwar period, in 1939 it was renamed the 1st Royal Tank Regiment.

=== Second World War ===
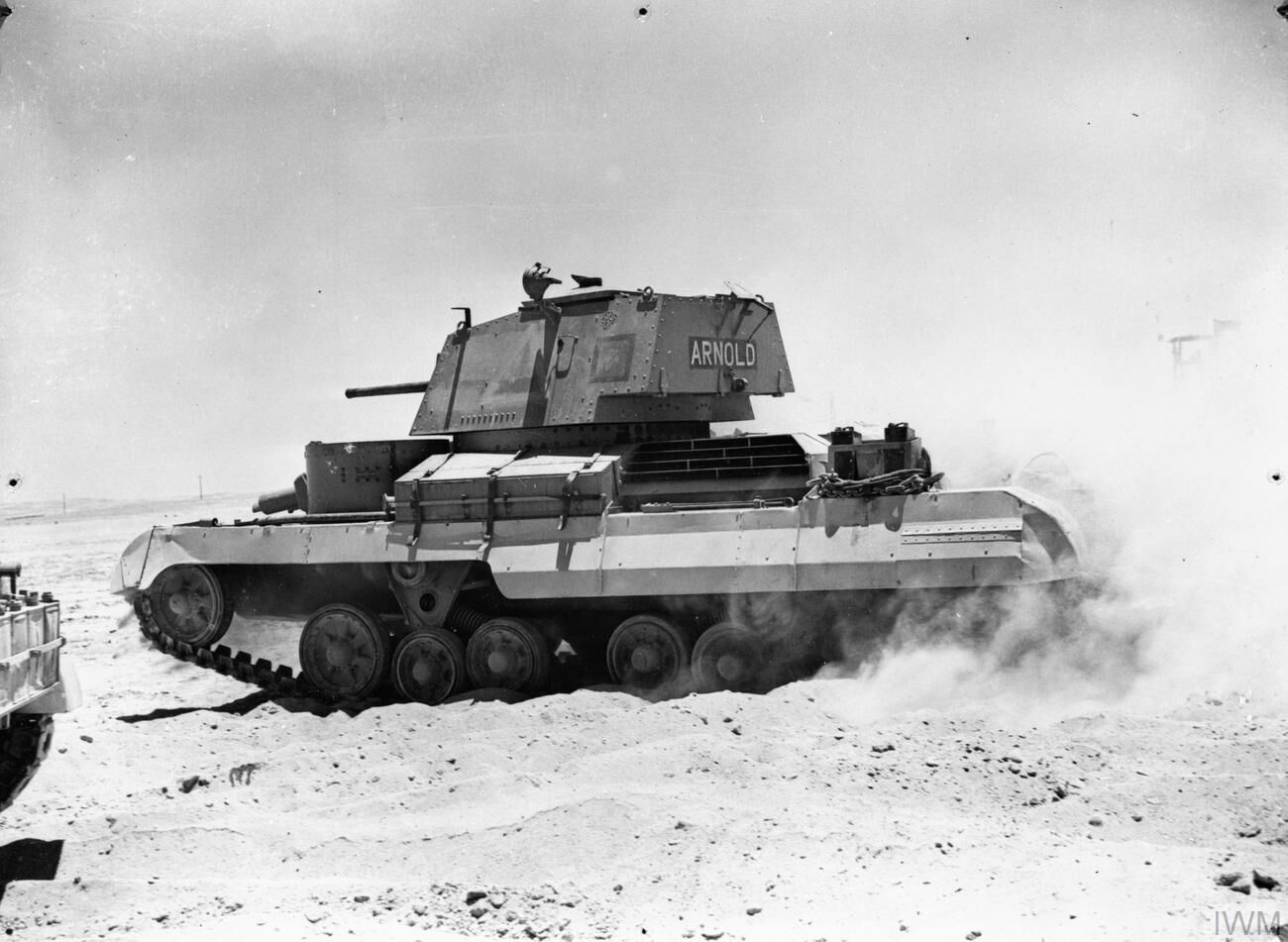
Cruiser tank Mk I of 1 RTR at Abbasia, Egypt, 30 May 1940.

During the Second World War (1939–1945) the regiment took part in the Siege of Tobruk in the summer of 1941 and the Battle of El Alamein in October 1942, the advance up Italy in late 1943, the Normandy landings in June 1944 and the Western Allied invasion of Germany in 1945. From the Battle of El Alamein the regiment was part of the 22nd Armoured Brigade, itself part of the 7th Armoured Division, for the rest of the war.

=== Post war ===
After a period based in Germany, 1 RTR fought Communist forces during the Korean War.

The regiment was in the Suez Canal Zone as part of 25 Armoured Brigade to protect British interests in the Zone from in January 1954 to August 1955.

In 1957 the regiment was posted to Hong Kong as part of the 48th Gurkha Infantry Brigade. When it left Hong Kong in 1960 it replaced the Comet tanks with Centurions at Hohne, West Germany.

=== Amalgamation ===
In 1993, it amalgamated with the 4th Royal Tank Regiment without change of title. It incorporated both of the original regiments' traditional recruiting areas of Merseyside and Scotland.

In 1999, two squadrons were split off as part of the Joint NBC Regiment with No. 27 Squadron RAF Regiment. In December 2011 the Regiment handed over its responsibility for CBRN to the RAF Regiment.

On 25 June 2008 at Buckingham Palace, both 1RTR and 2 RTR were presented with their new Standard by The Queen, which included the new Battle Honour of Al Basrah 2003.

On 2 August 2014 the regiment merged with 2RTR to form a single Regiment Royal Tank Regiment (RTR), based at Aliwal Barracks, Tidworth and is one of three armoured regiments equipped with the Challenger 2 tank.

The history and traditions of 1 RTR are preserved by 'Ajax" Squadron of the RTR.

== Commanding Officers ==
The Commanding Officers have been:

- 1959–1961: Lt.-Col. Tresham D. Gregg
- 1961–1963: Lt.-Col. John D. Masters
- 1963–1966: Lt.-Col. Richard E. Simpkin
- 1966–1967: Lt.-Col. Laurie W.G. Gingell
- 1967–1969: Lt.-Col. Ian H. Baker
- 1969–1972: Lt.-Col. Simon J. Beardsworth
- 1972–1974: Lt.-Col. John P. Maxwel
- 1974–1976: Lt.-Col. Antony K.F. Walker
- 1976–1979: Lt.-Col. David L. Lewis
- 1979–1981: Lt.-Col. A.S. Jeremy Blacker
- 1981–1984: Lt.-Col. Michael Seymour
- 1984–1986: Lt.-Col. Michael I. Keun
- 1986–1989: Lt.-Col. Mark J.H. Goodson
- 1989–1991: Lt.-Col. Timothy E. Hall
- 1991–1993: Lt.-Col. Adrian G.R. Carroll
- 1993–1995: Lt.-Col. Peter Gilchrist
- 1995–1997: Lt.-Col. Ian J. Rodley
- 1997–2000: Lt.-Col. David C. Eccles
- 2000–2002: Lt.-Col. Christopher M. Deverell
- 2002–2004: Lt.-Col. Patrick J. Kidd
- 2004–2006: Lt.-Col. Hamish S. De Bretton-Gordon
- 2006–2009: Lt.-Col. Ian J. Gibb
- 2009–2011: Lt.-Col. Gavin J. Thompson
- 2011–2013: Lt.-Col. Andrew M. Britton
- 2013–2016: Lt.-Col. Nicholas J. Cowey
- 2016–2018: Lt.-Col. Simon A. Ridgway
- 2018–present: Lt.-Col. James R. Howard

== Associated Cadet Forces ==
- Mildenhall Detachment, Suffolk Army Cadet Force
- Cadbury Heath Detachment, Bristol Army Cadet Force
- Ainsdale Detachment, Merseyside Army Cadet Force
- Westbury Detachment, Wiltshire Army Cadet Force
- Oldham Detachment, Greater Manchester Army Cadet Force
- 131 (Battersea) Detachment, South West London Army Cadet Force
- Bovington and Purbeck Detachment, Dorset Army Cadet Force
