= List of Foreign Legionnaires =

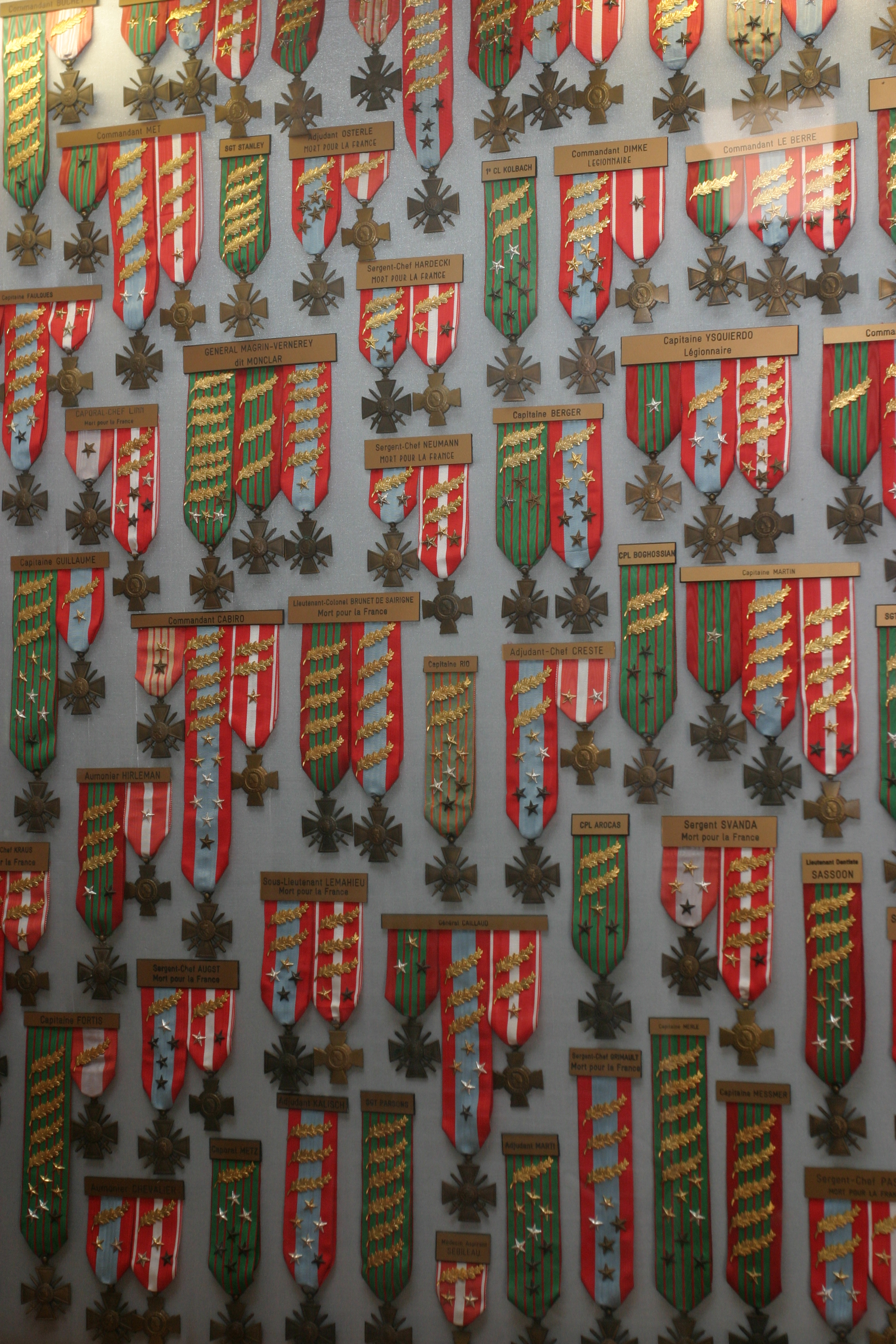
The Croix de guerres of officers, NCO's and legionnaires in the Foreign Legion

Notable people who served in the Foreign Legion. The following is a list of legionnaires who have gained fame or notoriety inside or outside of the legion.

== Officers ==
- Prince Aage of Denmark
- Dimitri Amilakvari – Georgian noble, became an iconic figure of the Free French Forces.
- Paul Arnaud de Foïard
- Crown Prince Bảo Long (Chữ nôm 保隆) of Vietnam – head of the Nguyễn dynasty, the now deposed emperors of Vietnam
- François Achille Bazaine – Marshal of France
- Dominique Borella- French mercenary and anti-Communist
- Augustus Buchel
- François Certain Canrobert – Marshal of France
- Alexandre Joseph Count Colonna-Walewski, non-marital son of Napoleon I
- Jean Danjou – Commander at the Battle of Camarón
- Jules Gaucher – commander 13 DBLE, killed at Battle of Dien Bien Phu
- Georges Hamacek
- John F. "Jack" Hasey
- Pierre Jeanpierre
- Aarne Juutilainen
- Pierre Koenig
- André Lalande
- Jean-Marie Le Pen
- Prince Louis II of Monaco
- Patrice MacMahon, Marshal of France
- Raoul Magrin-Vernerey
- Pierre Messmer
- Prince Louis Napoléon – Prince Imperial
- Peter J. Ortiz, (Acting Lieutenant)
- Henri, comte de Paris
- Zinovy Peshkov
- Rémy Raffalli
- Peter I of Serbia King of Serbia and SHS
- Jacques Leroy de Saint Arnaud, Marshal of France
- Hélie de Saint Marc, former resistant deported to Buchenwald, participated in the Algiers putsch.
- Gabriel Brunet de Sairigné, Colonel dead on duty in 1948, Compagnon de la Libération
- Pierre Segrétain
- Sisowath Monivong, 1908–9, then prince, later King of Cambodia
- Josef Šnejdárek, French legionnaire, officer and later Czechoslovak general
- Žarko Todorović "Valter", one of the leaders of the Chetnik resistance in the first phase of World War II in the German occupied Yugoslavia, serving as first commander of the undercover Chetnik headquarters in Belgrade.
- Susan Travers
- James Waddell – New Zealander in the French Foreign Legion

== Enlisted ==
- Léon Ashkenazi, also known as Manitou, Jewish philosopher
- Arthur Bluethenthal, All-American football player and decorated World War I pilot
- Giuseppe Bottai, Italian minister
- Eugene Bullard, First African-American military pilot
- Blaise Cendrars, Swiss novelist and poet
- Max Deutsch, Austrian composer
- Mamady Doumbouya, Guinean Colonel
- François Faber, Luxembourgian cyclist and Tour de France winner
- Siegfried Freytag, German fighter ace
- Jean Genet, French novelist, playwright, poet, essayist, and political activist
- Abraham Golan, Jewish businessman
- Ante Gotovina, former lieutenant general of the Croatian Army
- Hans Hartung, German-French painter
- Erwin James (Monahan), British journalist and murderer
- Ernst Jünger, German writer
- Aarne Juutilainen, Finnish army captain
- Norman Kerry, U.S. actor
- Moise Kisling, Polish painter
- Arthur Koestler, Jewish-Hungarian polymath author
- Raoul Lufbery, French-American fighter pilot and flying ace in World War I
- Max-Emmanuel Mader, German legionnaire, the most decorated non-commissioned officer of the Legion during the First World War.
- Billy Meier, Swiss ufologist, photographer
- Rodion Malinovsky, Soviet Marshal and Defence Minister.
- Simon Murray, British businessman, adventurer, author and the oldest man to reach the South Pole unsupported
- Peter Julien Ortiz, American, later decorated USMC officer and OSS operative in occupied France during WWII (Also served in the Legion as an acting Lieutenant)
- Radomir Pavitchevitch
- Cole Porter, (Note: While controversy exists regarding his enlistment, the Foreign Legion backs his claim to have served, and a portrait of Porter hangs in the Foreign Legion’s museum at Aubagne, France.) American composer and songwriter
- Alex Rowe, serving British national
- Akihiko Saito, Japanese hostage in Iraq who later died in captivity
- Pal Sárközy de Nagy-Bócsa, advertiser, father of French President Nicolas Sarkozy
- Alan Seeger, American poet
- Rolf Steiner, Professional Soldier of Fortune in Biafra and Southern Sudan
- Milorad Ulemek, Serbian former militant
- Oswald Watt, Australian aviator
- William A. Wellman, American film director

== Honorary ==
- Dick Applegate
- Marcel Bigeard
- Christian de Castries
- Geneviève de Galard, nurse at the Battle of Dien Bien Phu, honorary Légionnaire de 1ère classe.
- Ante Gotovina, Croatian General
- Pierre Langlais
- Norman Schwarzkopf, Jr., Honorary Caporal (Corporal)
