= Chris Deverell =

British Army officer

General Sir Chris Deverell KCB MBE
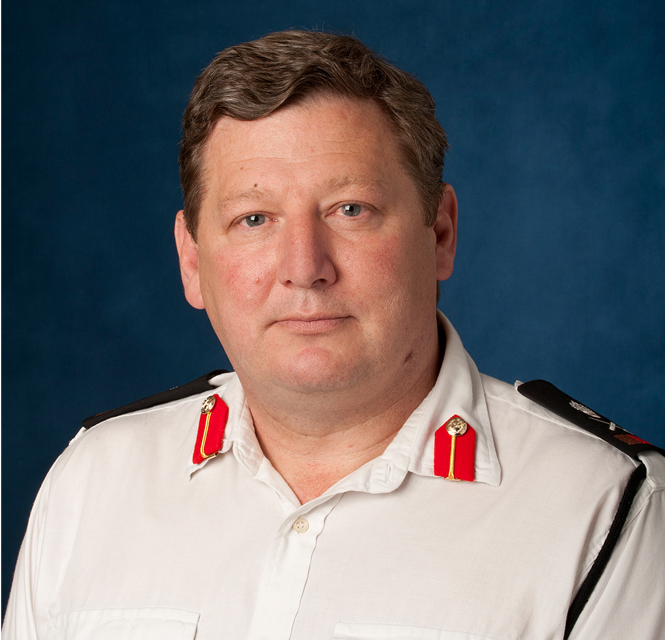
- Deverell in 2016
- Military career
- Allegiance: United Kingdom
- Branch: British Army
- Service years: 1979–2019
- Rank: General
- Commands: Joint Forces Command; 4th Armoured Brigade; Joint Chemical, Biological, Radiation and Nuclear Regiment
- Conflicts: The Troubles; Iraq War
- Awards: Knight Commander of the Order of the Bath; Member of the Order of the British Empire

Sir Christopher Michael Deverell is a retired British Army officer who served as Commander of the UK's Joint Forces Command and member of the UK Chiefs of Staff Committee from April 2016 to May 2019.

== Early life and education ==
Deverell was educated at Wellington College, Berkshire. He studied philosophy, politics and economics at Mansfield College, Oxford, graduating with a Bachelor of Arts (BA) degree in 1982. He was subsequently admitted to the Degree of Master of Arts (MA), and became an Honorary Fellow of Mansfield College in 2022.

== Military career ==
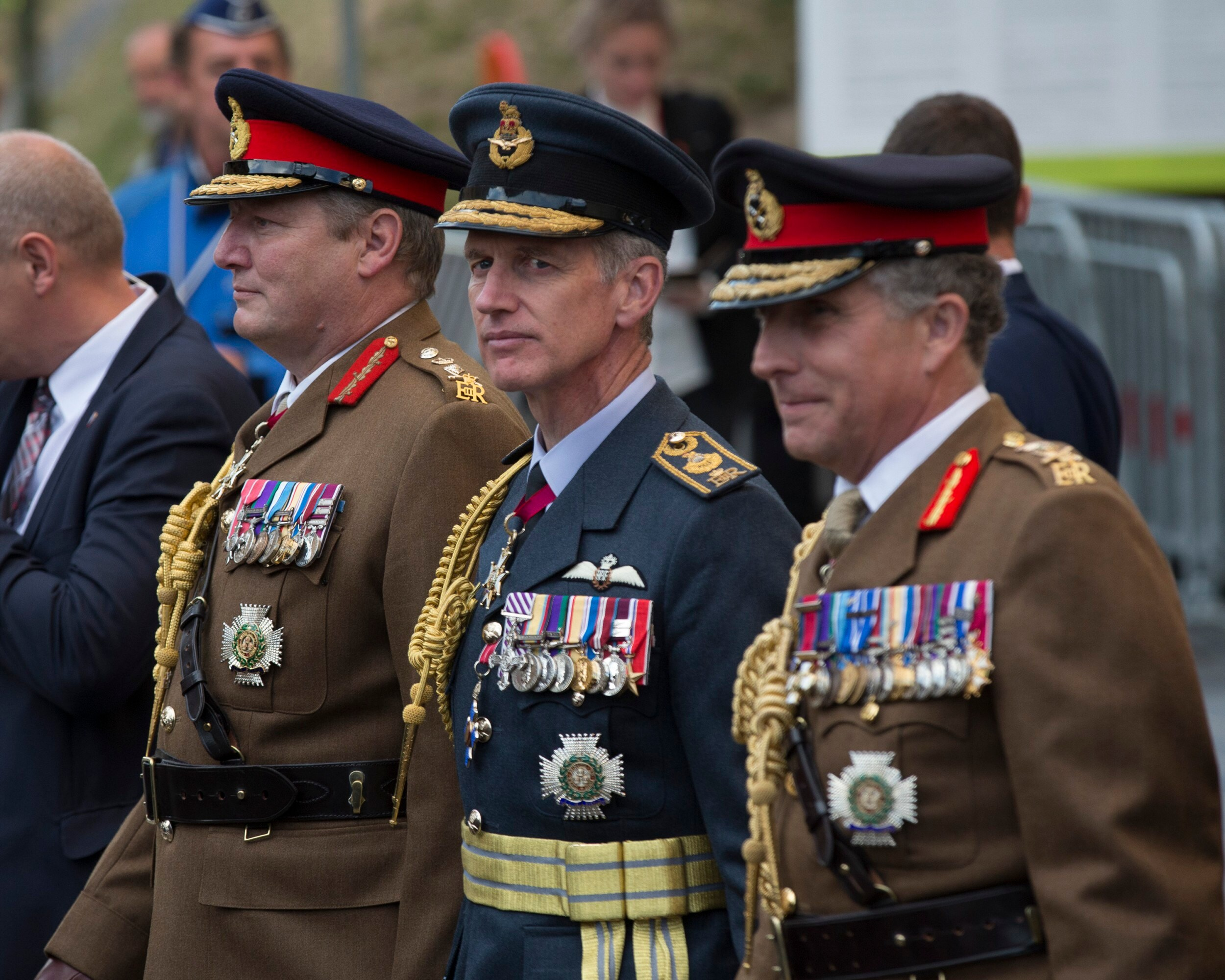
Deverell (left) with Chief of the Air Staff, Sir Stephen Hillier, and Chief of the General Staff, Sir Nicholas Carter

Deverell was commissioned into the 2nd Royal Tank Regiment in 1979. He was appointed a Member of the Order of the British Empire in the 1991 Birthday Honours, and went on to command the Joint Chemical, Biological, Radiological and Nuclear Regiment. He commanded 4th Armoured Brigade in Iraq (Basra and Maysan Governorates) and Germany (Osnabrück and Münster) from January 2005.

He was a Private Secretary to the Secretary of State for Defence George Robertson, and later Geoff Hoon, from 1997 to 2000.

Deverell became Director Equipment Capability (Ground Manoeuvre) from April 2007 and was made Director General Logistics Support and Equipment at HQ Land Forces in December 2008. He became Chief of Materiel (Land) and Quartermaster General from May 2012. Appointed Knight Commander of the Order of the Bath (KCB) in the 2015 New Year Honours, Deverell was promoted to general on 5 April 2016 on appointment as Commander of Joint Forces Command. He was appointed as an Aide-de-Camp General to The Queen on the same date. He retired from the British Army in September 2019.

== Later career ==
In 2019, Deverell founded an Innovation, Strategy and Leadership Consultancy, called Deverell Innovation Ventures. Amongst other roles, he is a Mentor for the Creative Destruction Lab (CDL) at Saïd Business School, and an External Member of the Council of the University of Oxford. He was a member of the Commission for Smart Government in 2020.

In September 2020, he wrote a The Daily Telegraph article advocating radical innovation at the Ministry of Defence, including spending 10% of budgets on digital innovation and the creation of a Chief Digital Officer. He has since continued to comment occasionally on Defence matters, including about the Russian invasion of Ukraine.

Military offices
Preceded by Sir Gary Coward	Quartermaster-General to the Forces; 2012–2016	Succeeded by Paul Jaques
Preceded by Sir Richard Barrons	Commander Joint Forces Command; 2016–2019	Succeeded by Patrick Sanders
