= 1366 Piccolo =

Main-belt asteroid

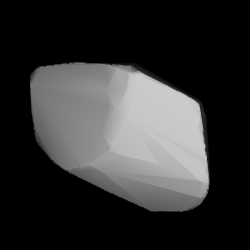
- Modelled shape of Piccolo from its lightcurve

Discovery
- Discovered by: E. Delporte
- Discovery site: Uccle Obs.
- Discovery date: 29 November 1932

Designations
- Named after: Auguste Cauvin (Chief-editor Le Soir)
- Alternative designations: 1932 WA · 1930 FA_{1} 1931 PC · 1931 RJ_{1} 1935 GM · 1935 JM; 1950 KL · 1961 TL_{1} 1961 VP · A916 NB
- Minor planet category: main-belt · (outer) background

Orbital characteristics
- Epoch 4 September 2017 (JD 2458000.5)
- Uncertainty parameter 0
- Observation arc: 84.51 yr (30,868 days)
- Aphelion: 3.2803 AU
- Perihelion: 2.4686 AU
- Semi-major axis: 2.8745 AU
- Eccentricity: 0.1412
- Orbital period (sidereal): 4.87 yr (1,780 days)
- Mean anomaly: 245.21°
- Mean motion: 0° 12^{m} 7.92^{s} / day
- Inclination: 9.4758°
- Longitude of ascending node: 24.147°
- Argument of perihelion: 282.70°

Physical characteristics
- Mean diameter: 26.92±1.03 km 27.50 km (derived); 27.55±1.8 km 28.02±2.68 km 29.9 km
- Synodic rotation period: 16.048±0.003 h 16.05±0.05 h 16.1834±0.0005 h 16.57 h
- Geometric albedo: 0.131; 0.1447 (derived); 0.1538±0.022; 0.167±0.014; 0.199±0.251
- Spectral type: X · S B–V = 0.710; U–B = 0.180
- Absolute magnitude (H): 10.14 · 10.24±0.30 · 10.45 · 10.52

1366 Piccolo, provisional designation 1932 WA, is an asteroid from the background population of the outer asteroid belt, approximately 28 kilometers in diameter. It was discovered on 29 November 1932, by astronomer Eugène Delporte at the Royal Observatory of Belgium in Uccle. The asteroid was named after Auguste Cauvin, chief-editor of the Belgian newspaper Le Soir.

== Orbit and classification ==
Piccolo is a non-family asteroid of the main belt's background population. It orbits the Sun in the outer asteroid belt at a distance of 2.5–3.3 AU once every 4 years and 10 months (1,780 days; semi-major axis of 2.87 AU). Its orbit has an eccentricity of 0.14 and an inclination of 9° with respect to the ecliptic.

The asteroid was first identified as A916 NB at Johannesburg Observatory in July 1916. The body's observation arc begins at Uccle with its official discovery observation.

== Naming ==
This minor planet was named after the pseudonym of Auguste Cauvin, also known as "d'Arsac", long-time editor-in-chief of the Belgian newspaper Le Soir (c. 1898–1937). The pseudonym "piccolo" means "small" in Italian. The official naming citation was mentioned in The Names of the Minor Planets by Paul Herget in 1955 (H 124). Asteroid 1350 Rosselia was also named after an editor of Le Soir by Delporte.

== Physical characteristics ==
Piccolo has been characterized as an X-type asteroid by Pan-STARRS photometric survey, while the LCDB assumes a stony S-type.

=== Rotation period and poles ===
In June 1984, a first rotational lightcurve of Piccolo was obtained from photometric observations by American astronomer Richard Binzel. Lightcurve analysis gave a rotation period of 16.57 hours with a brightness variation of 0.33 magnitude (U=2). In 2003 and 2005, two more lightcurves were obtained by French amateur astronomer René Roy. They gave a period of 16.048 and 16.05 hours and an amplitude of 0.24 and 0.29 magnitude, respectively (U=2/2).

In 2016, the asteroid lightcurve has also been modeled using photometric data from various sources. It gave a concurring period of 16.1834 hours and two spin axis in ecliptic coordinates of (352.0°, 49.0°) and (201.0°, 55.0°).

=== Diameter and albedo ===
According to the surveys carried out by the Infrared Astronomical Satellite IRAS, the Japanese Akari satellite and the NEOWISE mission of NASA's Wide-field Infrared Survey Explorer, Piccolo measures between 26.92 and 28.02 kilometers in diameter and its surface has an albedo between 0.1538 and 0.199. In April 2003, an albedo of 0.131 and a diameter of 29.9 kilometers have also been deduced from a stellar occultation.

The Collaborative Asteroid Lightcurve Link derives an albedo of 0.1447 and a diameter of 27.50 kilometers based on an absolute magnitude of 10.52.
