= No. 27 Squadron RAF Regiment =

Disbanded Royal Air Force Regiment Squadron

No. 27 Squadron Royal Air Force Regiment
- Squadron badge
- Active: 3 September 1951 – October 2021
- Country: United Kingdom
- Branch: Royal Air Force
- Type: Air Force Infantry
- Role: CBRN Detection
- Garrison/HQ: RAF Honington
- Motto: Defensores Defendo

No. 27 Squadron RAF Regiment was a CBRN squadron of the RAF Regiment in the Royal Air Force with the Defensores Defendo (I defend the defenders). It disbanded in October 2021.

== History ==
No. 27 Squadron RAF Regiment was formed on 3 September 1951, at RAF Yatesbury. The squadron was first deployed to Abu Suer in Egypt. On 28 November 1951, the squadron saw its first action against the Egyptians. Four enemy were killed in this action. The squadron remained in Egypt predominantly as an Internal Security force until it redeployed to Cyprus in January 1956.

In August 1977 the Queen, Elizabeth II of the United Kingdom, approved the awarding of a Standard to the squadron in recognition of 25 years service.

During the 1980s, 27 Squadron was based at RAF Leuchars, in Scotland. Its role was anti-aircraft defence and was equipped with the Rapier Field Standard A anti-aircraft missile system. Detachments from 27 Squadron, would regularly be sent to Belize in Central America, to provide airfield defence.

== Present ==
In 1995, the squadron moved to RAF Scampton as part of the RAuxAF Regiment. On 1 April 1999, No 27 Squadron and 1st Royal Tank Regiment merged to form the Joint Nuclear, Biological and Chemical Regiment (Jt NBC Regt). 27 Sqn ran the Biological Detection Capability of the Jt NBC Regt. In 2005, following the addition of radiological weapons to its remit, the Jt NBC Regt changed to the Joint Chemical, Biological, Radiation and Nuclear Regiment (Joint CBRN Regiment). In 2008 27 Sqn, still based at RAF Honington, temporarily re-roled to full Field Sqn status and following an intensive period of training and kitting, deployed to Kandahar, Afghanistan in 2009 for a tour of duty in the Force Protection role. 27 Sqn returned to its Joint Nuclear, Biological and Chemical Regiment role.

In 2012 the Jt CBRN Regiment disbanded with 27 Sqn continuing in the CBRN defence role as part of the new Defence CBRN Wing while 1st Royal Tank Regiment returned to the Field Army returning to role on the Challenger 2 prior to planned merger with 2 RTR in 2014. From March 2006 to August 2011, 27 Squadron was also responsible for providing Parachute Trained Light Role Teams of two eight man teams, commanded by a sergeant, with a two-man command element. The first parachute descent conducted by 27 Squadron personnel was in March 2006 when Sergeant Paul Crutchlow jumped with II Squadron. In August 2011, with the formation of the Defence CBRN Wing the Light Role teams moved from 27 Squadron to 26 Squadron.

It remained a CBRN Squadron temporarily as the Counter-CBRN role was passed on to 28 Engineer Regiment but disbanded in October 2021
