= Paul Jaques =

British Army officer

Lieutenant General Paul Jaques CB CBE
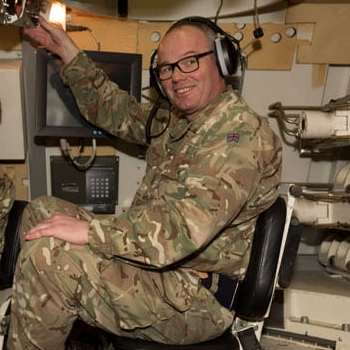
- Paul Jaques in 2018
- Military career
- Allegiance: United Kingdom
- Branch: British Army
- Service years: 1983–2019
- Rank: Lieutenant General
- Commands: 101st Logistic Brigade
- Conflicts: Gulf War; Iraq War
- Awards: Companion of the Order of the Bath; Commander of the Order of the British Empire

Lieutenant General Paul William Jaques, CB, CBE is a senior British Army officer, who served as Chief of Materiel (Land) and Quartermaster-General to the Forces.

== Military career ==
Jaques was commissioned into the Royal Electrical and Mechanical Engineers (REME) on 6 August 1983. He became commander of the 101st Logistic Brigade in December 2005, and saw action in that role in the Iraq War. He went on to be Head of Capability and Expeditionary Logistics in April 2008, Head of Equipment Planning to the Deputy Chief of the Defence Staff (Capability) in July 2011, and Director Land Equipment at Defence Equipment and Support in December 2013. He was appointed a Commander of the Order of the British Empire in the 2013 Birthday Honours.

Jaques was promoted to lieutenant general on 8 March 2016, and made Chief of Materiel (Land) and Quartermaster-General to the Forces that same year. He was appointed Companion of the Order of the Bath (CB) in the 2019 Birthday Honours. Jaques retired from the Regular Army on 7 December 2019.

Jaques was Master General REME from April 2017 to March 2023.

Military offices
Preceded by Christopher Deverell	Quartermaster-General to the Forces; 2016–2019	Succeeded by TBA
