= David Judd =

Lieutenant General David Judd CB
- Born: David Leslie Judd; 1950; Colchester, Essex
- Military career
- Allegiance: United Kingdom
- Branch: British Army
- Service years: 1970–2007
- Rank: Lieutenant General
- Service number: 489587
- Unit: Royal Electrical and Mechanical Engineers
- Commands: 4th Division
- Awards: Companion of the Order of the Bath

Lieutenant General David Leslie Judd CB (born 1950) is a former Quartermaster-General to the Forces.

== Military career ==
David Judd was commissioned into the Royal Electrical and Mechanical Engineers in 1970. In 2000, he was appointed Director-General Equipment Support (Land) as well as Quartermaster-General to the Forces. Then in 2003 he became General Officer Commanding 4th Division. His final posting was as Deputy Commander-in-Chief Regional Headquarters Allied Forces North in 2004. He retired in 2007.

He was also Colonel Commandant of the Royal Electrical and Mechanical Engineers.

Military offices
Preceded by Sir Scott Grant	Quartermaster-General to the Forces; 2000−2002	Succeeded by Anthony Raper
Preceded by Andrew Ritchie	GOC 4th Division; 2003−2004	Succeeded by Seumas Kerr
