= Tony Raper =

British Army general

Major General Tony Raper CB CBE
- Military career
- Allegiance: United Kingdom
- Branch: British Army
- Service years: 1970–2006
- Rank: Major General
- Conflicts: Bosnian War
- Awards: Companion of the Order of the Bath; Commander of the Order of the British Empire

Major General Anthony John Raper CB CBE is a former Quartermaster-General to the Forces.

== Military career ==
Educated at Welbeck Defence Sixth Form College, and the Royal Military Academy Sandhurst, Raper was commissioned into the Royal Corps of Signals in 1970. He subsequently undertook an army-funded in-service degree at Selwyn College, Cambridge, where he graduated in 1974. He was deployed to Bosnia, where he provided communications support for the Implementation Force (IFOR) in 1995.

In 1998 he was appointed chief executive of the Defence Communications Services Agency.

In 2001 he moved to the Defence Logistics Organisation, where he became director-general for strategy & logistic development: then in 2002 he was promoted to Defence Logistics Transformation Team leader as well as Quartermaster-General to the Forces. He retired in 2006.

He was also colonel commandant of the Royal Corps of Signals.

Military offices
Preceded by David Judd	Quartermaster-General to the Forces; 2002–2006	Succeeded by Timothy Tyler
