= Timothy Tyler =

British Army general

Major General Timothy Tyler CB
- Military career
- Allegiance: United Kingdom
- Branch: British Army
- Service years: 1972-2008
- Rank: Major General
- Conflicts: Iraq War
- Awards: Companion of the Order of the Bath

Major General Timothy Nicholas Tyler CB is a former Quartermaster-General to the Forces.

== Military career ==
Tim Tyler was commissioned into the Royal Electrical and Mechanical Engineers in 1972.

In 2003 he was selected to be Deputy Commander of the Iraq Survey Group, a team which had the onerous task of searching for weapons of mass destruction in Iraq.

In 2004 he was appointed Deputy Adjutant-General and in 2006 he was appointed Director-General Logistics (Land) and then Director-General Land Equipment as well as Quartermaster-General to the Forces. He retired in 2008.

He was also Colonel Commandant of the Royal Electrical and Mechanical Engineers from 1 March 2005, and the Corps of Army Music from 1 October 2005 to 31 October 2009.

Military offices
Preceded by Anthony Raper	Quartermaster-General to the Forces; 2006–2007	Succeeded by Dick Applegate
