= Boško Todorović =

- Бошко Тодоровић
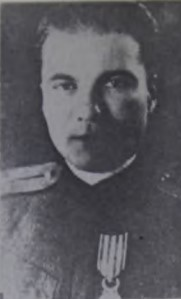
- Died: February 1942; Kifino Selo, Independent State of Croatia (modern-day Bosnia and Herzegovina)
- Military career
- Allegiance: Yugoslavia (?– April 1941); Chetniks (May 1941–death); Italy (1941–1942)
- Rank: Major
- Conflicts: Siege of Rogatica

Boško Todorović was a Chetnik commander and delegate of the Chetnik leader Draža Mihailović in eastern Bosnia during World War II. During the interwar period he was a major in the Royal Yugoslav Army. Following the April 1941 Axis invasion of Yugoslavia he joined Mihailović's Chetnik movement. Initially considered a moderate, he was responsible for negotiating the transfer of parts of eastern Bosnia from Italian to Chetnik administration in November 1941, after which the Chetniks massacred hundreds of Muslim civilians in the region. He also signed a collaboration agreement with the Italians to protect the Serb population in Italian-occupied areas. He was killed by the Yugoslav Partisans in February 1942, either trying to evade capture, or he was executed after a brief trial when captured in possession of compromising documents regarding collaboration with the Italians.

== In Serbia ==
According to the former Chetnik officer Milan Deroc, the headquarters of the Chetnik Belgrade Command was established based on a secret list of Yugoslav military officers who had returned from fighting during the April 1941 Axis invasion of Yugoslavia. This list was compiled by the former Royal Yugoslav Army Major Boško Todorović, whose brother was Žarko Todorović, a Chetnik intelligence officer.

In August 1941, following orders from the Chetnik Supreme Command of Draža Mihailović, Boško Todorović and Veselin Misita gathered men to go to Bosnia because the Chetniks had been ordered to avoid fighting the occupying Axis forces in German occupied territory of Serbia, but to fight against the fascist Ustaše in the Independent State of Croatia, of which Bosnia was a part.

== In eastern Bosnia ==
The historian Marko Attila Hoare states that Todorović and Jezdimir Dangić arrived in eastern Bosnia in mid-August 1941 on the orders of Mihailović, to take over control of the revolt on his behalf. Hoare further states that Todorović was appointed as commander of the Operational Units for East Bosnia and Herzegovina, and Dangić as commander of the Mountain Staff of the Bosnian Chetnik Detachments. In practical terms, Hoare considers that Dangić was the more important of the two Chetnik leaders in terms of deciding Chetnik policy. The historian Matteo Milazzo states that Todorović was a supporter and the "chief military subordinate" of Dangić. The Bosnian historian Enver Redžić states that Todorović "mostly commanded units in eastern Herzegovina and occasionally in eastern Bosnia". Redžić states that the two delegates were devoted to their tasks to impose military discipline on the Chetnik movement in the region, bring local Chetniks under Mihailović's sway, and lead them in attacking Ustaše forces and Muslims. Under the guidance of these two Mihailović delegates, the Chetnik movement in eastern Bosnia steadily became more anti-Muslim and anti-communist, and the relationship between the Chetniks and Partisans in the region steadily deteriorated. A slightly different account is given by the historian Branko Latas, who states that on 2 September 1941, Todorović crossed the Drina river and went into eastern Bosnia together with several officers. Latas further states that without meeting with Dangić, Todorović went straight to Romanija where he took over the command over the Romanija Chetnik Battalion. Soon after Todorović came to Bosnia he established detachment "Boško Jugović". During the October 1941 Siege of Rogatica, Todorović collected volunteers from units of both Partisans and Chetniks to attack the town's garrison which was fortified in the local school, but the attack was unsuccessful.

On 16 November, Chetnik and Partisan representatives met at Vlasenica in an attempt to resolve tensions that had arisen due to the outbreak of fighting between the two forces in the neighbouring German-occupied territory of Serbia. During the conference, Todorović worked to avoid a break between the two forces, while other Chetnik leaders like Dangić wanted to bring the conflict to a head. At Todorović's suggestion, the conference created a joint commission to formulate a declaration aimed at avoiding conflict. The members of the commission were the commander of the Romanija Partisan Detachment, Slaviša Vajner-Čiča, the Chetnik leader Pero Đukanović, and Todorović, who was supposedly considered to be neutral. The draft declaration tried to maintain unity between the Bosnian Serb rebels of both movements, but was rejected by both the commander of the Partisan General Staff for Bosnia-Hercegovina, Svetozar Vukmanović Tempo and Dangić. The conference then broke up without agreement being reached. The following day, the Chetniks issued their own declaration, banning all political activity in liberated territories and proscribing the arming of Muslims and Croats. The signatories included Đukanović, Dangić, Todorović and others. Dangić's Mountain Staff was turned into the Chetnik-run "Provisional Administration of East Bosnia", with Todorović appointed chief of the operational department. In the Chetnik view, the break with the Partisans had occurred because the Partisans wanted to conduct a "people's liberation struggle", whereas the Chetniks wanted to wage a "Serb liberation struggle".

The first contacts between Todorović and Italian intelligence were established in November 1941, when the command of occupying forces in Yugoslavia concluded that it was best to establish contacts with Chetnik commanders and use the Chetniks against the communist movement in Yugoslavia, rather than organize large Italian military campaigns to suppress the uprising. As a result of their negotiations with Todorović, the Italians compelled the NDH authorities to withdraw from Višegrad, Foča and Goražde, and enabled the Chetniks to build up their "Provisional Administration of East Bosnia" as a civil and military government, by turning over the administration of these towns and the surroundings districts to them. The expansion of this Chetnik "puppet administration" was followed by systematic massacres and plunder of the Bosnian Muslim population of the area. For example, after the handover of Goražde on 29 November, several hundred civilians were massacred, and after the Italians turned Foča over to the Chetniks, around 500 Muslims were killed. These massacres were not simply revenge for prior Ustaše killings of Serbs, as eastern Bosnia was relatively untouched by such massacres prior to the spring of 1942. According to Hoare, they "were above all an expression of the genocidal policy and ideology of the Chetnik movement". The Chetniks received significant amounts of arms, ammunition, military equipment and food from the Italians.

The Partisans refused to participate in the struggle against Ustaše, using the Chetnik unsuccessful attack on Borač to attack Chetniks and capture members of their headquarters. In April 1942, Yugoslav Partisans attacked and liquidated Ustaše stronghold in Borač.

On 14 December 1941, the Central Committee of the Communist Party of Yugoslavia sent an instruction to Partisan forces to attack the Chetniks of Mihailović, Dangić and also the Chetnik forces commanded by Todorović.

In December 1941, Todorović went to northern Herzegovina with Chetnik commanders, appointed by Mihailović in command of the Chetnik headquarters for Eastern Bosnia and Herzegovina. Despite this, the leader of the Partisans, Josip Broz Tito, continued to hope that some Bosnian Chetniks, such as Todorović, could be separated from those, like Dangić, who were implacably opposed to the Partisans.

In January 1942, Todorović developed a set of guidelines by which Chetniks under his command would collaborate with occupying Italian forces. On 11 January 1942, a preliminary collaboration agreement between a representative of the eastern Bosnian Chetniks and the Italian VI Corps was concluded. The agreement was to become effective after it had been signed by the Italian command and by Chetnik leaders including Todorović. The agreement included provisions that the Italians and Chetniks would not fight each other, and that Chetniks would be permitted to retain their arms in areas occupied by the Italians. According to the historian Jozo Tomasevich, later developments suggest the agreement was signed by all parties and came into full effect. According to Redžić, this and similar agreements with the Italians were negotiated to protect the Serb population in Italian-occupied areas. In relation to collaboration with the Italians, Todorović issued a special statement to his subordinate Chetnik commanders. The statement said that they were authorised to collaborate with Italian units "to the degree necessary" to protect the Serbian population from any kind of terror.

In mid-January 1942, a German-NDH joint offensive, Operation Southeast Croatia was launched. When Todorović and Dangić became aware of the commencement of the operation, they advised other Chetnik commanders that it was targeted at the Partisans, and there was no need for the Chetniks to get involved. Following this, Chetnik units withdrew from their positions on the front line, let the Germans pass through their areas, or went home. Many withdrew across the Drina into the German-occupied territory of Serbia to avoid being engaged, which severely weakened the Partisan defences with the result that they suffered significant casualties and lost a great deal of territory. These actions severed any remaining cooperative links that remained between the Chetniks and Partisans in eastern Bosnia. On 19 January 1942, the Partisan Provincial Committee and General Staff for Bosnia-Herzegovina issued a proclamation denouncing Todorović and other Chetnik leaders for turning the uprising into a Serb-chauvinist campaign against Muslims. Because the Chetniks failed to assist the Partisans during Operation Southeast Croatia, the Central Committee of the Communist Party ceased all further attempts to cooperate with them and issued a declaration on 22 January declaring that Todorović and other Chetnik leaders were traitors. On 26 January, Todorović reported back to Mihailović on the progress of negotiations with the Italians. He argued that the "Serbian question" should be resolved by the "evacuation, eradication and forced relocation of a significant number of the Muslims and Catholics." Her claimed that the "Turks" (a pejorative for Muslims) were hostile to the Chetniks and were burning Serb villages, and reported that his Chetniks had burned a number of "Turkish" villages, and were fighting in the Stolac district.

In eastern Herzegovina the class struggle began between Chetniks and Partisans, with Todorović being among the first victims of this dramatic conflict which erupted between former allies who fought together against the Axis forces until then.

== Death ==
In January 1942, the Partisans captured Todorović in the village of Vrba, near Gacko. He was captured together with nine other Chetniks, including Captain Radojica Rončević and Vidak Kovačević. The Partisans and their captives headed toward Partisan Montenegrin HQ in Nikšić, but they were intercepted by Chetniks commanded by the priest Radojica Perišić who released Todorović and arrested the Partisans. Against the order of Todorović, the Partisans were released. This angered Josip Broz Tito so much that he ordered establishing a special unit, which included Partisans released by Todorović, with the only one purpose — to find and execute Todorović at any cost, and appointed Vlado Šegrt as its commander.

There are different versions about his death. One source says that Todorović was killed in the night between 18 and 19 February, when Partisan unit commanded by Šegrt surrounded a house where he stayed with three of his men, threw a grenade through the window and killed Todorović as he ran out of the house. According to Tomasevich, Todorović was captured by the Partisans toward the end of February 1942, at which time he was in possession of documents that showed that he was collaborating with the Italians, and after a brief trial, Todorović was executed. According to the official Yugoslav history, the Partisans executed Todorović in Kifino Selo.

In his memoirs, published in 1985, Vukmanović Tempo accused his fellow Partisan leader Rodoljub Čolaković of friendly treatment of Boško Todorović. Čolaković responded by accusing Vukmanović Tempo of being "quarrelsome, intolerant and suspicious" towards his comrades. Hoare observes that the Central Committee of the Communist Party criticised Čolaković for "excessive collaboration" with the Chetniks, of which, he concludes, Čolaković was definitely guilty.

== Sources ==
- Deroc, Milan (1997). By the Pen, the Sword, and Dagger: Biography of Captain Derok, a Leader of the 1941 Uprising in German Occupied Serbia. Paris, France: Ed. Marie-Renée Morin. OCLC 38585569.
- Hamović, Miloš (1994). Izbjeglištvo u Bosni i Hercegovini: 1941-1945 [Refugee in Bosnia and Herzegovina: 1941-1945] (in Serbian). Belgrade, Yugoslavia: Filip Višnjić. ISBN 978-86-7363-139-4.
- Hoare, Marko Attila (2006). Genocide and Resistance in Hitler's Bosnia: The Partisans and the Chetniks 1941–1943. New York: Oxford University Press. ISBN 978-0-19-726380-8.
- Latas, Branko (1979). Četnički pokret Draže Mihailovića: 1941-1945 [The Chetnik Movement of Draža Mihailović: 1941–1945] (in Serbo-Croatian). Belgrade, Yugoslavia: Beogradski izdavačko-grafički zavod. OCLC 438875322.
- Mićanović, Slavko (1971). Istočna Bosna u NOB-u 1941-1945 [Eastern Bosnia in the National Liberation Struggle 1941–1945]. Belgrade, Yugoslavia: Vojnoizdavački zavod. OCLC 18261725.
- Milazzo, Matteo J. (1975). The Chetnik Movement & the Yugoslav Resistance. Baltimore, Maryland: Johns Hopkins University Press. ISBN 978-0-8018-1589-8.
- Miljanić, Gojko (1970). Nikšićki NOP odred [Nikšić Partisan Detachment] (in Serbo-Croatian). Belgrade, Yugoslavia: Vojnoizdavaćki zavod. OCLC 15173618.
- Papadopolos, Dušan (1974). AVNOJ i narodnooslobodilačka borba u Bosni i Hercegovini: 1942–1943 : materijali sa naučnog skupa održanog u Sarajevu 22. i 23. novembra 1973. godine [AVNOJ and the National Liberation Struggle in Bosnia and Herzegovina: 1942–1943: Materials from the Scientific Conference held in Sarajevo on 22 and 23 November 1973]. Belgrade, Yugoslavia: Rad. OCLC 6933708.
- Parmaković, Dragoslav (1973). Mačvanski (Podrinski) narodnooslobodilački partizanski odred, 1941–1944 [Mačva (Podrinje) National Liberation Partisan Detachment, 1941–1944] (in Serbo-Croatian). Šabac, Yugoslavia: Podrinje National Liberation Struggle Fund. OCLC 22122869.
- Plećaš, Neđeljko B. (1983). Ratne godine: 1941–1945 [The War Years: 1941–1945] (in Serbian). Columbus, Ohio: Kosovo Publishing Company. OCLC 10425957.
- Redžić, Enver (2005). Bosnia and Herzegovina in the Second World War. Abingdon, Oxfordshire: Frank Cass. ISBN 978-0-7146-5625-0.
- Tomasevich, Jozo (1975). War and Revolution in Yugoslavia, 1941–1945: The Chetniks. Stanford, California: Stanford University Press. ISBN 978-0-8047-0857-9.
- VI (1969). Zbornik Dokumenta [Papers and Proceedings]. Vol. 3. Belgrade, Yugoslavia: Vojnoistorijski institut. OCLC 862146692.
- VIG (1982). Vojno-istoriski glasnik.
- VII (1953). Zbornik dokumenata i podataka o narodno-oslobodilačkom ratu jugoslovenskih naroda: knj. 1-21. Borbe u Srbiji, Vojvodini i Kosovu 1941-1944 god. Vojno-istoriski institut Jugoslovenske armije.
