= Slobodan Princip =

Yugoslav partisan (1914–1942)

Slobodan Princip "Seljo"
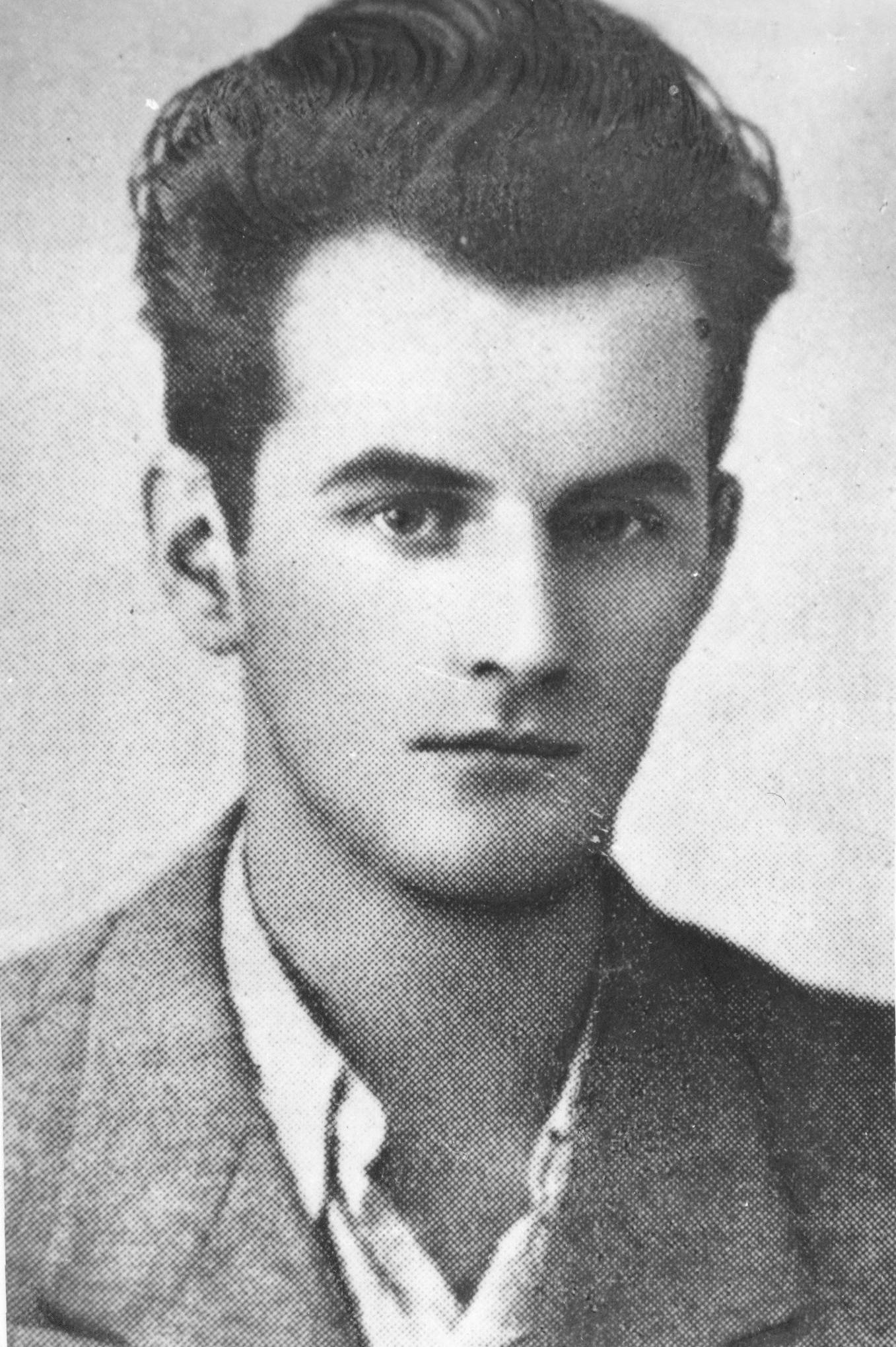
- Princip in 1938
- Born: Slobodan Princip; 25 May 1914; Hadžići, Bosnia and Herzegovina, Austria-Hungary
- Died: 25 April 1942 (aged 27); Šćepan Polje, Independent State of Croatia
- Awards: Order of the People's Hero

Slobodan Princip (Serbian Cyrillic: Слободан Принцип; 25 May 1914 – 25 April 1942), nicknamed Seljo (Сељо), was a Yugoslav Partisan fighter and the district staff chief of the Partisan Sarajevo area during World War II. He was posthumously awarded the Order of the People's Hero. He was the nephew of Gavrilo Princip.

== Life ==
Princip was born in Hadžići, near Sarajevo, Austria-Hungary (now Bosnia and Herzegovina), into an ethnic Serb family. His father Jovan (Jovo) was the brother of Gavrilo Princip, the assassin of Archduke Franz Ferdinand of Austria. He joined the League of Communist Youth of Yugoslavia (SKOJ) during his gymnasium years in Sarajevo.

The Partisan and Chetnik forces captured Rogatica on 24 October 1941, during the Siege of Rogatica. The final assault of the Partisan forces was carried out under the direct command of Partisan HQ member Seljo, including a detachment commanded by Slaviša Vajner "Čiča", when Partisans used Molotov cocktails to attack the town garrison. He got typhoid fever during Operation Trio and died in Šćepan Polje on 25 April 1942. He was buried at the Cemetery of National Heroes on Trebević near Sarajevo.

== Legacy ==
Princip was posthumously awarded the Order of the People's Hero on 7 November 1942. The acclaimed student cultural club (AKUD) "Slobodan Princip – Seljo" was named after him. A number of schools in Bosnia and Herzegovina and Belgrade in Serbia have been named after him as well. In neighbourhood Lukavica in Istočno Novo Sarajevo was military base of Yugoslav People's Army named after him.

== Orders ==
- Order of the People's Hero: 7 November 1942
