= Hamish de Bretton-Gordon =

Chemical and biological weapons expert

Colonel Hamish de Bretton-Gordon OBE
- Born: September 1963 (age 63); Crowborough, East Sussex
- Military career
- Allegiance: United Kingdom
- Branch: British Army
- Service years: 1988–2011
- Rank: Colonel
- Units: Royal Tank Regiment, Joint CCBRN Regiment
- Commands: Joint CCBRN Regiment, NATO Rapid Reaction CBRN Battalion
- Conflicts: Gulf War
- Awards: Officer of the Most Excellent Order of the British Empire (OBE)

Hamish Stephen de Bretton-Gordon OBE (born September 1963) is a British former Army officer and commentator on chemical and biological weapons. Reaching the rank of colonel after 23 years of military service, he was commanding officer of the UK's Joint Chemical, Biological, Radiological and Nuclear Regiment and NATO's Rapid Reaction CBRN Battalion. He is an adviser to the Union of Syrian Medical Charities and a visiting lecturer in disaster management at Bournemouth University.

He has commented on chemical and biological weapons for the BBC, ABC and The Guardian and on tank warfare for The Daily Telegraph.

== Military career ==
On 4 January 1988, as a university candidate, de Bretton-Gordon was commissioned as a second lieutenant (on probation) in the Royal Tank Regiment. In September 1988, his commission was confirmed: he was given seniority in the rank of second lieutenant from 10 August 1985, and promoted to lieutenant backdated to 4 January 1988 with seniority from 10 August 1987. He transferred from a short service commission to a regular commission on 29 January 1991, and was promoted to captain on 10 August 1991. In 1991, he saw active service in Iraq with the 14th/20th King's Hussars as part of the First Gulf War.

After attending the Australian Command and Staff College, he was promoted to major on 30 September 1995. He was promoted to lieutenant colonel on 30 June 2003. In 2004, rather than receiving the command of a tank regiment as he had expected, he was appointed commanding officer of the UK's Joint Chemical, Biological, Radiological and Nuclear Regiment. In preparation for the command, he studied for a diploma in chemical biology at the Royal Military College of Science. In the 2005 New Year Honours, he was appointed Officer of the Order of the British Empire (OBE). He additionally commanded NATO's Rapid Reaction CBRN Battalion between 2005 and 2007. He was promoted to colonel on 30 June 2007. From 2007 to 2010, he was based at HQ Land Command as assistant director intelligence, surveillance and reconnaissance. He retired from the British Army on 12 September 2011.

== See also ==
- Alastair Hay
