= Peter J. Ortiz =

United States Marine Corps officer

Pierre (Peter) Julien Ortiz
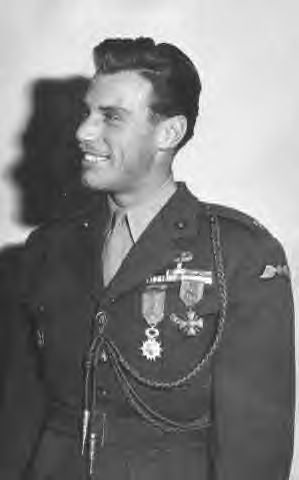
- Colonel Peter J. Ortiz, U.S. Marine Corps
- Born: July 5, 1913; New York City, US
- Died: May 16, 1988 (aged 74); Prescott, Arizona, US
- Burial place: Arlington National Cemetery
- Spouse: Jean M. Ortiz
- Children: 1
- Military career
- Allegiance: United States; France
- Branch: U.S. Marine Corps; French Foreign Legion
- Rank: Colonel, USMC; Acting Lieutenant, FFL
- Conflicts: French conquest of Morocco; World War II: Battle of France; Tunisian Campaign; Operation Jedburgh
- Awards: Navy Cross (2); Legion of Merit w/ Combat "V"; Purple Heart (2); British Order of the British Empire; French Légion d'Honneur; French Médaille militaire French Croix de Guerre (5); French Médaille des Évadés; French Croix du Combattant; French Médaille Coloniale; French Médaille des Blesses; Order of Ouissam Alaouite

Pierre (Peter) Julien Ortiz OBE (July 5, 1913 – May 16, 1988) was a United States Marine Corps colonel who received two Navy Crosses for extraordinary heroism as a major in World War II. He served in North Africa and Europe during the war, as a member of the French Foreign Legion, the Marine Corps, and the Office of Strategic Services (OSS), operating behind enemy lines several times. Ortiz also acted in Hollywood films after the war. He was one of very few Marines who served in combat in Europe during World War II, and one of the most decorated Marine officers of the war.

== Early life ==
Ortiz was born in New York to an American mother of Swiss descent and a French-born Spanish father. He was educated at the University of Grenoble in France. He spoke ten languages, including English, Spanish, French, Italian, Portuguese, German and Arabic.

== French Foreign Legion ==
On February 1, 1932, at the age of 18, Ortiz joined the French Foreign Legion for five years' service in North Africa. He was sent to the Legion's training camp at Sidi Bel Abbès in French Algeria. He later served in Morocco, where he was promoted to corporal in 1933 and sergeant in 1935. He was awarded the Croix de Guerre twice during a campaign against the Riffian people. He also received the Médaille militaire. As an acting lieutenant, he was offered a commission as a second lieutenant if he re-enlisted. Instead, when his contract expired in 1937, he returned to the United States to serve as a technical adviser for war films in Hollywood.

== World War II ==
With the outbreak of World War II and the United States still neutral, Ortiz re-enlisted in the French Foreign Legion in October 1939 as a sergeant, receiving a battlefield commission in May 1940. He was wounded while blowing up a fuel dump and captured by the Germans during the 1940 Battle of France. He escaped the following year via Lisbon and made his way to the United States.

Ortiz enlisted in the United States Marine Corps on June 22, 1942. As a result of his training and experience, he was commissioned as a second lieutenant after only 40 days in service. He was promoted to captain on December 3. With his knowledge of the region, he was sent to Tangier, Morocco. He conducted reconnaissance behind enemy lines in Tunisia for the Office of Strategic Services (OSS). At the time, though most of Morocco was a French protectorate, Tangiers was an international zone. During a night mission, Ortiz was seriously wounded in his right hand in an encounter with a German patrol, and he was sent back to the United States to recover.

In 1943, Ortiz became a member of the OSS. On January 6, 1944, he was dropped by parachute into the Haute-Savoie region of German-occupied France as part of the three-man "Union I" operation, with Colonel Pierre Fourcaud of the French secret service and Captain Thackwaite from the British Special Operations Executive. Their mission was to evaluate the capabilities of the Resistance and train the Maquis du Vercors in the Alpine region. He drove four downed Royal Air Force pilots to the border of neutral Spain before leaving France with his team in late May.

Promoted to major, Ortiz parachuted back into France on August 1, 1944, this time as the commander of the "Union II" mission. He was captured by the Germans on August 16. In April 1945, he and three other prisoners of war escaped while being moved to another camp, but after ten days with little or no food, returned to their old camp after discovering that the prisoners had virtually taken control. On April 29, the camp was liberated.

Ortiz rose to the rank of lieutenant colonel in the Marine Corps Reserve. He was released from active duty in 1946 and returned to Hollywood. In April 1954, he volunteered to return to active duty to serve as a Marine observer in Indochina. The Marine Corps did not accept his request because "current military policies will not permit the assignment requested." On March 1, 1955, he retired from the Marine Corps and was promoted to the rank of colonel on the retirement list because he had been decorated in combat.

Colonel Ortiz was awarded 24 medals in all from three countries.

== Acting ==
Upon returning to civilian life, Ortiz became an actor. He appeared in a number of films, several with director John Ford, including Rio Grande, in which he played "Captain St. Jacques". According to his son, Marine Lieutenant Colonel Peter J. Ortiz, Jr., "My father was an awful actor but he had great fun appearing in movies". After serving as technical advisor in 13 Rue Madeleine (1947), he did so again in the film Operation Secret (1952), which was based on his World War II exploits. Ortiz had no control over the script of the film, in which he was portrayed by Cornel Wilde, and "wasn't too happy with the result." He told columnist Bob Thomas that "they had stipulated that I was to help in the screenplay but never consulted me."

Ortiz's acting career floundered during the 1950s, and in 1955 he advertised for work in movie trade publications. Ortiz lived in a small tract house in Tarzana, California, with his wife and 19-month-old son. He told Aline Mosby of United Press International that a movie producer had promised to promote his career when he appeared on the radio program This Is Your Life in 1951, but that promised opportunities in film had not materialized and that he had only obtained work as an extra. His ad said that he was "willing and able to do anything".

He also appeared in one episode of the short-lived TV series Rocky Jones, Space Ranger (1953).

== Death ==
Ortiz died of cancer on May 16, 1988, at the age of 74 and was buried at Arlington National Cemetery, Plot: Section 59 Site 1269. He was survived by his wife Jean and their son Peter J. Ortiz Jr.

In August 1994, the village of Montgirod, in the Auvergne-Rhône-Alpes region of France, renamed its town hall square the "Place du Colonel Peter Ortiz".

== Military decorations ==
Ortiz was the most highly decorated member of the OSS. His decorations and medals include:

Parachutist Badge
Navy Cross w/ 5/16" gold star		Legion of Merit w/ 'V' device
Purple Heart w/ 5/16" gold star	Prisoner of War Medal	American Campaign Medal
European–African–Middle Eastern Campaign Medal w/ three 3/16" bronze stars	World War II Victory Medal	Armed Forces Reserve Medal w/ bronze hourglass device
Marine Corps Reserve Ribbon	Chevalier of the Legion of Honour (France)	Médaille militaire (France)
Croix de Guerre w/ three bronze palms (France)	Croix de Guerre w/ one silver-gilt and one silver star (France)	Escapees' Medal (France)
Combatant's Cross (France)	Colonial Medal w/ campaign clasp: "MAROC" (France)	Medal for the War Wounded (France)
1939–1945 Commemorative War Medal (France)	Officer of Order of the British Empire (Military Division) (United Kingdom)	Chevalier of the Order of Ouissam Alaouite (Morocco)

=== Navy Cross citations ===
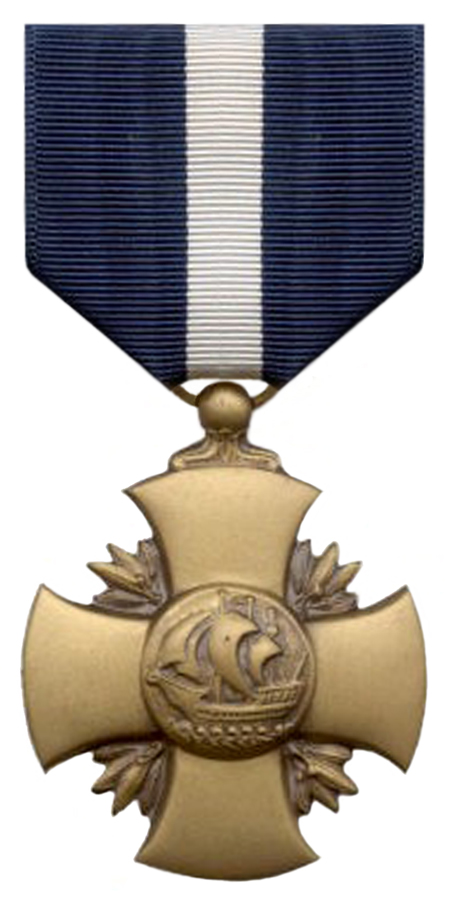

ORTIZ, PIERRE (PETER) J.
(First Award)
Rank and organization: Major, U.S. Marine Corps (Reserve)
Place: Office of Strategic Services (London)
Date of Action: January 8–20, 1944

Citation:

The Navy Cross is presented to Pierre (Peter) J. Ortiz, Major, U.S. Marine Corps (Reserve), for extraordinary heroism while attached to the United States Naval Command, Office of Strategic Services, London, England, in connection with military operations against an armed enemy in enemy-occupied territory, from January 8, to May 20, 1944. Operating in civilian clothes and aware that he would be subject to execution in the event of his capture, Major Ortiz parachuted from an airplane with two other officers of an Inter-Allied mission to reorganize existing Maquis groups in the region of Rhone. By his tact, resourcefulness and leadership, he was largely instrumental in affecting the acceptance of the mission by local resistance leaders, and also in organizing parachute operations for the delivery of arms, ammunition and equipment for use by the Maquis in his region. Although his identity had become known to the Gestapo with the resultant increase in personal hazard, he voluntarily conducted to the Spanish border four Royal Air Force officers who had been shot down in his region, and later returned to resume his duties. Repeatedly leading successful raids during the period of this assignment, Major Ortiz inflicted heavy casualties on enemy forces greatly superior in number, with small losses to his own forces. By his heroic leadership and astuteness in planning and executing these hazardous forays, Major Ortiz served as an inspiration to his subordinates and upheld the highest traditions of the United States Naval Service.

ORTIZ, PIERRE (PETER) J.
(Second Award)
Rank and organization: Major, U.S. Marine Corps (Reserve)
Place: Office of Strategic Services (France)
Date of Action: August 1, 1944 – April 27, 1945

Citation:

The Navy Cross is presented to Pierre (Peter) J. Ortiz, Major, U.S. Marine Corps (Reserve), for extraordinary heroism while serving with the Office of Strategic Services during operations behind enemy Axis lines in the Savoie Department of France, from August 1, 1944, to April 27, 1945. After parachuting into a region where his activities had made him an object of intensive search by the Gestapo, Major Ortiz valiantly continued his work in coordinating and leading resistance groups in that section. When he and his team were attacked and surrounded during a special mission designed to immobilize enemy reinforcements stationed in that area, he disregarded the possibility of escape and, in an effort to spare villagers severe reprisals by the Gestapo, surrendered to this sadistic Geheim Staats Polizei. Subsequently imprisoned and subjected to numerous interrogations, he divulged nothing, and the story of this intrepid Marine Major and his team became a brilliant legend in that section of France where acts of bravery were considered commonplace. By his outstanding loyalty and self-sacrificing devotion to duty, Major Ortiz contributed materially to the success of operations against a relentless enemy, and upheld the highest traditions of the United States Naval Service.

== Complete filmography ==
Film
Year	Title	Role	Notes
1949	She Wore a Yellow Ribbon	Gunrunner	Uncredited
1949	Task Force	Pilot	Uncredited
1949	Twelve O'Clock High	Weather Observer	Uncredited
1950	When Willie Comes Marching Home	Pierre - French Resistance Fighter	Uncredited
1950	Chain Lightning	Young Captain	Uncredited
1950	The Capture	Employee	Uncredited
1950	Spy Hunt	Soldier	
1950	Abbott and Costello in the Foreign Legion	Corporal	Uncredited
1950	Rio Grande	Capt. St. Jacques	
1950	The Du Pont Story	Charles I. du Pont	
1951	Sirocco	Maj. Robbinet	Uncredited
1951	Flying Leathernecks	Captain	Uncredited
1951	I'll See You in My Dreams	Soldier	Uncredited
1952	Retreat, Hell!	Maj. Knox	
1952	What Price Glory	French General	Uncredited
1952	Blackbeard the Pirate	Pirate	Uncredited
1952	Mr. Walkie Talkie		
1953	San Antone	Rider	Uncredited
1953	Commando Cody: Sky Marshal of the Universe	Henchman	Twelve-part serial
1953	The Desert Rats	Wireman	Uncredited
1953	Devil's Canyon	Guard	Uncredited
1954	Jubilee Trail	Horseman	Uncredited
1954	Hell and High Water	Crewman	Uncredited
1954	King Richard and the Crusaders	Castelaine	
1955	Son of Sinbad	Cutthroat	Uncredited
1955	A Lawless Street	Hiram Hayes	Uncredited
1956	7th Cavalry	Pollock	
1957	The Halliday Brand	Manuel	
1957	The Wings of Eagles	Lt. Charles Dexter	Uncredited

== See also ==
- Mustang (military officer)
- List of United States Marines
- List of Foreign Legionnaires
- French Foreign Legion
