= Scott Grant =

British Army general

Lieutenant General Sir Scott Grant KCB
- Born: 28 September 1944 (age 82)
- Military career
- Allegiance: United Kingdom
- Branch: British Army
- Service years: 1965–2000
- Rank: Lieutenant General
- Commands: Royal College of Defence Studies; UK Support Command (Germany)
- Awards: Knight Commander of the Order of the Bath

Lieutenant General Sir Scott Carnegie Grant, KCB (born 28 September 1944) is a former British Army officer who served as Quartermaster-General to the Forces from 1998 to 2000.

== Military career ==
Educated at The King's School, Pontefract, the Royal Military Academy Sandhurst and Clare College, Cambridge, Scott Grant was commissioned into the Corps of Royal Engineers in 1965. He became Director-General Training & Doctrine for the Army in 1991, Team Leader for the Command Structure Review in 1993, and General Officer Commanding UK Support Command (Germany) in 1994. In 1996 he became Commandant of the Royal College of Defence Studies, and in 1998 he was appointed Quartermaster-General to the Forces. He was appointed a Knight Commander of the Order of the Bath in the 1999 New Year Honours, and retired in 2000.

Grant was also Chief Royal Engineer, Colonel of the Queen's Lancashire Regiment, and Colonel Commandant of The King's Division and the Royal Engineers.

In retirement Grant was appointed Director of Customer Support for Thales Defence.

== Personal life ==
Grant married in 1973 and has a son and a daughter.

Military offices
New command (Replaced post of C-in-C BAOR)	GOC United Kingdom Support Command (Germany); 1994–1995	Succeeded by Christopher Drewry
Preceded by Sir Timothy Garden	Commandant of the Royal College of Defence Studies; 1996–1998	Succeeded by John McAnally
Preceded by Sir Samuel Cowan	Quartermaster-General to the Forces; 1998–2000	Succeeded by David Judd
Honorary titles
Preceded by Sir John Stibbon	Chief Royal Engineer; 1999–2004	Succeeded by Sir Kevin O'Donoghue
