= Quartermaster-General to the Forces =

Former senior British Army appointment

The Quartermaster-General to the Forces, commonly just referred to as the Quartermaster-General (QMG), was a senior general in the British Army. Latterly, up until 2016, the office was held by a senior General Officer in the army with responsibility for logistics. The post was superseded by that of "Chief of Materiel (Land) Defence Equipment and Support".

== History ==
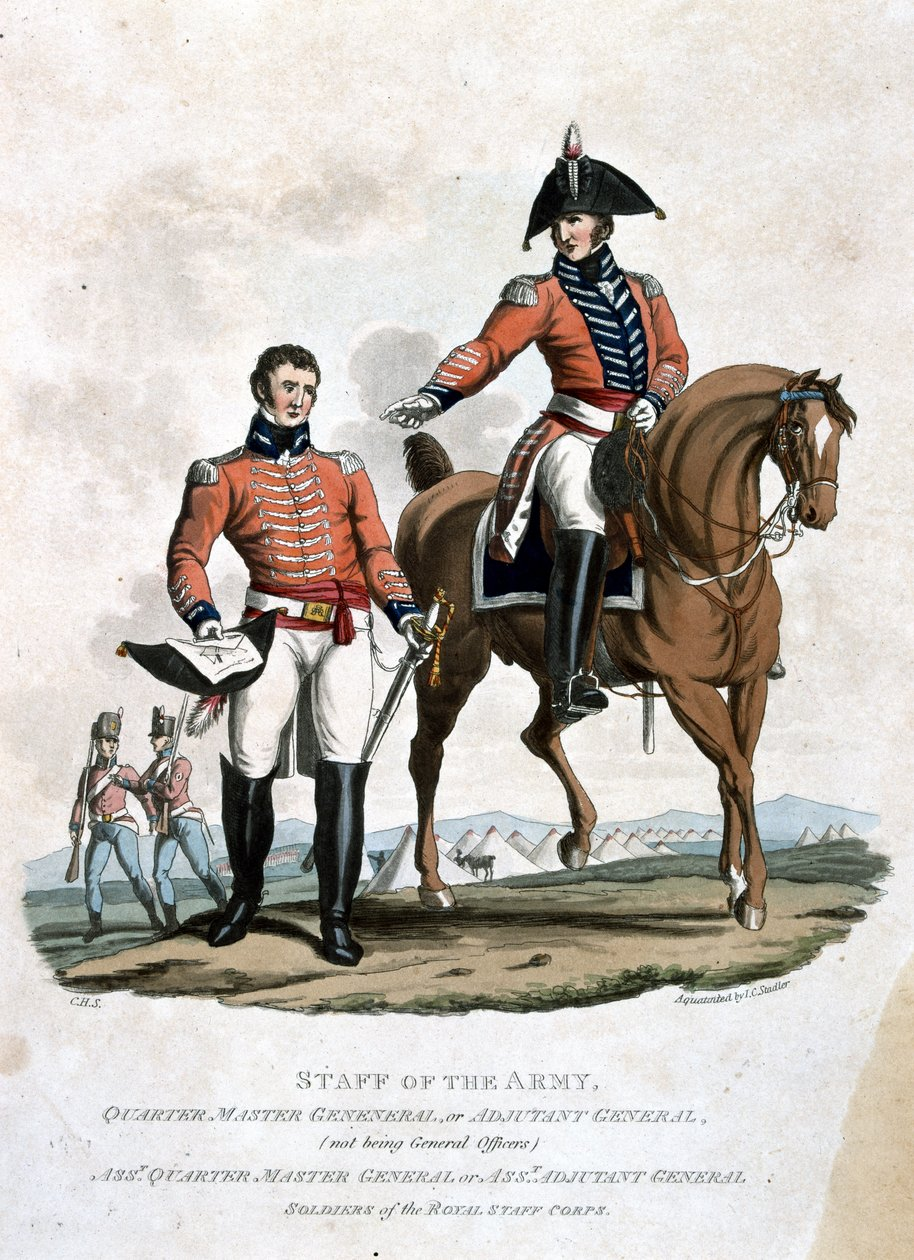
1812 engraving of a quarter-master general and assistant quarter-master general

A Quartermaster-General first appears in English Army records in 1667; as a permanently established post it dates from 1686.

=== Responsibilities ===
The Quartermaster-General was (like the Adjutant-General) a senior staff officer of the Commander-in-Chief of the Forces, responsible for the movement and quartering of troops. From the 1680s to the 1880s, the QMG periodically had responsibility for military intelligence in addition.

In 1888, the Quartermaster-General took over responsibility for the transport and supply of equipment, provisions and munitions, formerly overseen by the Commissariat and Transport Department and the Surveyor-General of the Ordnance. From 1904 the Quartermaster-General to the Forces was the Third Military Member of the Army Council (1904) and its successor, the Army Board.

The appointment of a Deputy Quartermaster-General dates from 1710 and Assistant Quartermasters-General are recorded from as early as 1692.

=== Defence Equipment and Support ===
In January 2007, following the formation of Defence Equipment and Support, Lieutenant General Richard Applegate assumed the appointment of 'Chief of Materiel (Land), Defence Equipment and Support Organisation'; the following month, he was appointed to the office of Quartermaster General. His two immediate successors were also gazetted as holding 'the appointment of Chief of Materiel (Land) Defence Equipment and Support and the office of Quartermaster General', but when Paul Jaques was appointed in 2016 it was simply as 'Chief of Materiel (Land) Defence Equipment and Support'. (The Ministry of Defence organisation charts have not used the term "Quartermaster-General" since 2011.)

== Present day ==
In June 2020, the post of Chief of Materiel (Land) (CoM(L)) was renamed Director General Land (DG(L)), 'to bring DE&S in line with other Civil Service departments and better reflect our business focus'.

== Recent holders of the post ==
=== Quartermaster General ===
Holders of the post have included:

- 1712–1742 Major-General John Armstrong
- 1742–1763 Lieutenant-General Humphrey Bland
- 1763–1796 Lieutenant-General George Morrison
- 1796–1803 Lieutenant-General Sir David Dundas
- 1803–1811 Lieutenant-General Sir Robert Brownrigg
- 1811–1851 General Sir James Gordon
- 1851–1855 Lieutenant-General Sir James Freeth
- 1855–1865 Lieutenant-General Sir Richard Airey
- 1865–1870 Lieutenant-General Sir Hope Grant
- 1870–1871 General Sir Frederick Haines
- 1871–1876 General Sir Charles Ellice
- 1876–1880 General Sir Daniel Lysons
- 1880–1882 Lieutenant-General Sir Garnet Wolseley
- 1882–1887 General Sir Arthur Herbert
- 1887–1890 Major-General Sir Redvers Buller
- 1890–1893 Lieutenant-General Sir Thomas Baker
- 1893 General Sir Robert Biddulph
- 1893–1897 General Sir Evelyn Wood
- 1897–1898 General Sir Richard Harrison
- 1898–1899 General Sir George Stuart White
- 1899–1903 General Sir Charles Clarke
- 1903–1904 General Sir Ian Hamilton
- 1904–1905 General Sir Herbert Plumer
- 1905–1908 General Sir William Nicholson
- 1908–1912 Lieutenant-General Sir Herbert Miles
- 1912–1919 General Sir John Cowans
- 1919–1923 Lieutenant-General Sir Travers Clarke
- 1923–1927 Lieutenant-General Sir Walter Campbell
- 1927–1930 Lieutenant-General Sir Hastings Anderson
- 1931–1934 General Sir Felix Ready
- 1935–1939 General Sir Reginald May
- 1939–1942 General Sir Walter Venning
- 1942–1946 General Sir Thomas Riddell-Webster
- 1946–1947 General Sir Daril Watson
- 1947–1950 General Sir Sidney Kirkman
- 1950–1952 General Sir Ivor Thomas
- 1952–1955 General Sir Ouvry Roberts
- 1955–1956 Lieutenant-General Maurice Chilton
- 1956–1958 General Sir Nevil Brownjohn
- 1958–1961 General Sir Cecil Sugden
- 1961–1965 General Sir Gerald Lathbury
- 1965–1966 General Sir Charles Richardson
- 1966–1969 General Sir Alan Jolly
- 1969–1973 General Sir Antony Read
- 1973–1977 General Sir William Jackson
- 1977–1979 General Sir Patrick Howard-Dobson
- 1979–1982 General Sir Richard Worsley
- 1982–1983 Lieutenant-General Sir Paul Travers
- 1983–1986 General Sir Richard Trant
- 1986–1988 General Sir Charles Huxtable
- 1988–1991 General Sir Edward Jones
- 1991–1994 General Sir John Learmont
- 1994–1996 Lieutenant General Sir William Rous
- 1996–1998 Lieutenant General Sir Samuel Cowan
- 1998–2000 Lieutenant General Sir Scott Grant
- 2000–2002 Major-General David Judd
- 2002–2006 Major-General Anthony Raper
- 2006–2007 Major-General Timothy Tyler
- 2007–2009 Lieutenant General Dick Applegate
- 2009–2012 Lieutenant General Gary Coward
- 2012–2016 Lieutenant General Sir Christopher Deverell

=== Chief of Materiel (Land) Defence Equipment and Support ===
- 2007–2009 Lieutenant General Dick Applegate
- 2009–2012 Lieutenant General Gary Coward
- 2012–2016 Lieutenant General Sir Christopher Deverell
- 2016–2019 Lieutenant General Paul Jaques
- 2019–2020 Christopher Bushell

=== Director General (Land) Defence Equipment and Support ===
- 2020–2024 Christopher Bushell
- 2024–Present Lieutenant General Simon Hamilton
