= Siege of Rogatica (1941) =

Battle in WWII

- Part of World War II in Yugoslavia
Date	13 – 24 October 1941
Location	Rogatica, Independent State of Croatia (present-day Bosnia and Herzegovina) 43.8°N 19°E
Result	Chetnik-Partisan victory: Chetniks and Partisans captured Rogatica

Belligerents
Allies: Chetniks; Yugoslav Partisans	Axis: Independent State of Croatia

Commanders and leaders
Chetniks: Boško Todorović; Žarko Mitrović; Radivoje Kosorić; Partisans: Slobodan Princip Seljo; Slaviša Vajner Čiča	Garrison in Rogatica: Marko Vrkljan; Relief forces from Sarajevo: Slavko Kvaternik; Vladimir Laxa

Units involved
Chetniks; Battalion; Company; Partisans; 1st Romanija company Sočić company Gučeska company Seljanska company Rogatica battalion	Garrison in Rogatica: Croatian Home Guard; 2nd battalion of Vojna Krajina (Vojkra); Ustaše; Relief forces from Sarajevo: 6 battalions

Casualties and losses
More than 15+ killed 90 wounded	> 2 (executed) / (surrendered)
- A number of Muslim and Serb civilians
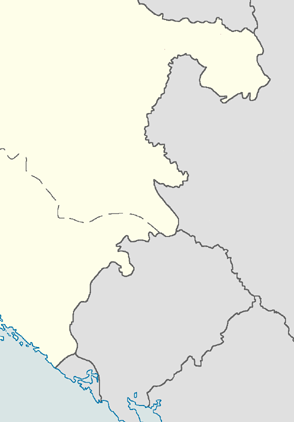
- Location of Rogatica in the eastern NDH

The siege of Rogatica was a joint attack of Partisan and Chetnik rebel forces on Rogatica, then held by the Independent State of Croatia. The siege continued between 13 and 24 October 1941.

== Background ==
At the beginning of World War II in Yugoslavia, Rogatica and all of eastern Bosnia along with Sandžak in Serbia became part of the Independent State of Croatia. The military units of the Independent State of Croatia in eastern Bosnia consisted of regular units of the Croatian Home Guard and members of the local Muslim population who were recruited into units of Ustaše militia that distinguished itself in the persecution of Serbs from the beginning of the war.

During the war, Rogatica was captured many times by different belligerents. The first capture by combined Chetnik-Partisan forces occurred on 6 September 1941. The rebel forces that attacked Rogatica had around 400 men in total, consisting of 240 Partisans and 160 Chetnik forces commanded by Aćim Babić. The rebels forced the town's garrison, consisting of the Croatian Home Guard, Ustaše and the local Muslim Militia, to flee toward Mesići. That afternoon, Muslim Militia forces commanded by Zulfo Dumandžić recruited reinforcement in Višegrad and with support of Ustaše and Croatian Home Guard returned to recapture Rogatica, burning Zagorice along the way and massacring its population. Approximately 100 civilians were killed during this assault. Ustaše commander Marko Vrkljan began taking Serb men and women as hostages. Some were immediately killed, while most survived until rebels captured the town in October 1941.

One of the most important consequences of this first attack was additional fortification, both in the town and around it. The main aim of the Chetnik-Partisan offensive on Rogatica, Knežina and Žepa in October 1941 was to connect rebel-controlled territories in eastern Bosnia and western Serbia. Muslims from Rogatica were evacuated to Sarajevo following an order issued on 11 October. In mid-October 1941, Rogatica was completely surrounded by Partisan and Chetnik forces, forcing its garrison to be supplied by aeroplanes that quickly became an easy target for the besieging forces.

== Forces ==
According to the plan for the capture of Rogatica, the Partisan-Chetnik forces were composed of the following units:

- Partisan forces:
  - 1st Romanija company — around 100 men and 1 Maxim gun
  - Sočić company — around 120 men
  - Gučeska company — more than 120 men
  - Seljanska company — about 120 men
  - Rogatica battalion — about 300 men
- Chetnik forces:
  - Battalion commanded by Radivoje Kosorić
  - Company commanded by Žarko Mitrović with about 150 men

The town's garrison consisted of 1,000 troops of Croatian Home Guard and Ustaše forces commanded by Vrkljan. According to some sources their forces numbered 2,000. The Croatian Home Guard units included 2nd battalion of Vojna Krajina (Vojkra).

== Siege ==
The rebels first cleansed surrounding villages from Ustaše Militia units and attacked the town on 13 October 1941. The Chetnik company commanded by Žarko Mitrović was first to successfully break into the town, but they had to retreat after a counterattack, leaving 6 or 8 dead. The next attack was commanded by Boško Todorović who collected volunteers from all attacking units to attack the garrison fortified in the local school, also without success.

The relief forces consisting of six battalions of Croatian Home Guard, commanded by Croatian Minister of Armed Forces Slavko Kvaternik and General Vladimir Laxa, were sent from Sarajevo to release the besieged garrison and recapture Rogatica, also without success. According to post-war communist sources, during the surrender negotiations, three aeroplanes attacked the besieging forces with bombs, but since they flew at very low height, two were shot down.

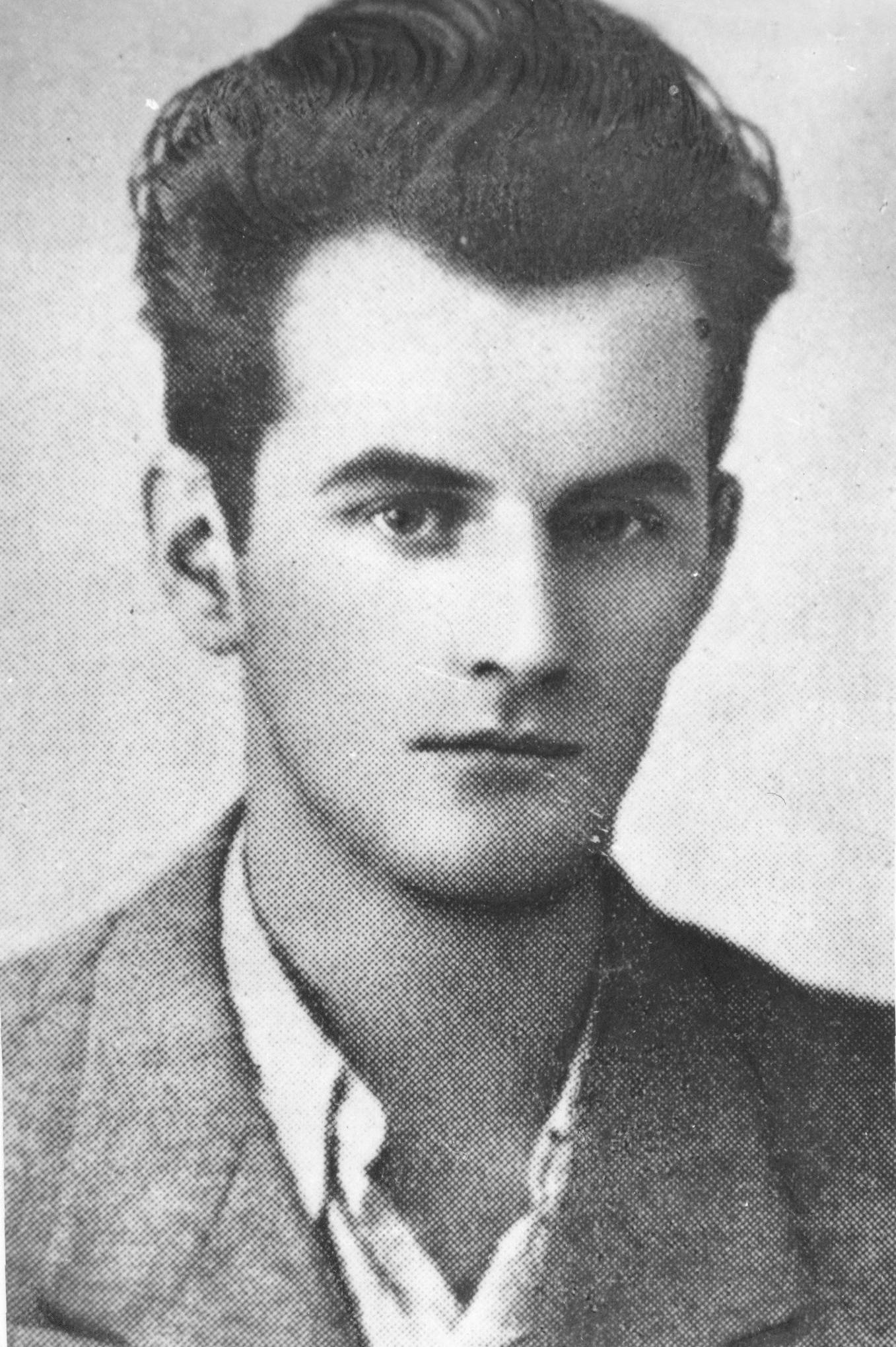
Slobodan Princip

The Partisan and Chetnik forces captured Rogatica on 24 October 1941. The final assault of Partisan forces was under direct command of member of Partisan HQ Slobodan Princip Seljo and detachment commanded by Slaviša Vajner Čiča when Partisans used Molotov cocktail to attack town's garrison.

The official Croatian report says that units of Croatian Home Guard left the town at 3 am on 24 October. According to Zafirovski, both Chetniks and Partisans participated in the battle, but Partisans finally captured the town. During the siege of Rogatica Chetnik forces killed many Muslims. Chetniks from Rogatica, including those whose all family members were killed by Ustaše, were particularly cruel during massacres of Muslims. The Partisan and Chetnik forces captured 1,000 rifles, 10 machine guns and other equipment from the captured town's garrison forces.

== Aftermath ==
The subsequent events are unclear. According to some sources, both Chetniks and Partisans executed the local Ustaše commander and continued to kill Muslims.

The loss of Rogatica had important consequences for Ustaša forces in the remaining territory of eastern Bosnia. Their strategic positions were significantly weakened. Muslim refugees from Rogatica fled to other eastern Herzegovinian towns. According to the testimony of captured member of Croatian Home Guard, Chetniks from Rogatica particularly distinguished themselves during massacres of Muslims in Višegrad, especially targeting Muslims from Rogatica. By January 1942, Chetniks killed around 2,000 people from the Rogatica district.

== See also ==
- Safet Plakalo

== Sources ==
- Čekić, Smail (1996). Genocid nad Bošnjacima u Drugom svjetskom ratu: dokumenti [Genocide of Bosniaks in World War II: documents] (PDF). Udruženje Muslimana za antigenocidne aktivnosti. Archived (PDF) from the original on 15 October 2020.
- Mićanović, Slavko (1971). Istočna Bosna u NOB-u 1941–1945: Sjećanja učesnika. Redaktori: Slavko Mićanović [i dr.]. Izbor fotografija: Nedžad Bise. Vojnoizdavački zavod.
- ВМ (1962). Vesnik. Belgrade (Serbia) Vojni muzej Jugoslovenske marodne armije.
- Hamović, Miloš (1994). Izbjeglištvo u Bosni i Hercegovini: 1941–1945. Filip Višnjić.
- Institut (1969). Prilozi. Institut za istoriju radničkog pokreta Sarajevo.
- Petovar, Rudi; Trikić, Savo (1982). Šesta proleterska istočno-bosanska brigada. Vojnoizdavački zavod.
- Muzej (1966). Prilozi za proučavanje istorije Sarajeva. Muzej grada Sarajeva.
- Branković, Mesud (1966). Rogatica. Svjetlost.
- Terzić, Velimir (1957). Oslobodilacki rat naroda Jugoslavije 1941–1945. Vojni istoriski Institut Jugoslovenske narodne armije.
- Dulić, Tomislav (2005). Utopias of Nation: Local Mass Killing in Bosnia and Herzegovina, 1941–42. Uppsala Universitet. ISBN 978-91-554-6302-1.
