= Dick Applegate =

British Army general

Lieutenant General Dick Applegate CB OBE
- Born: 10 March 1955 (age 71)
- Military career
- Allegiance: United Kingdom
- Branch: British Army
- Service years: 1973–2010
- Rank: Lieutenant General
- Nickname: Dick
- Commands: 19th Regiment Royal Artillery; Commander Royal Artillery for 3rd Division
- Conflicts: Bosnian War; Kosovo War; Northern Ireland
- Awards: Companion of the Order of the Bath; Officer of the Order of the British Empire; Legion of Merit (Officer Degree); Legionnaire de 1ère classe

Lieutenant General Richard Arthur David Applegate CB OBE (born 20 March 1955) is a former quartermaster-general and Master-General of the Ordnance to the Army. He left the British Army in October 2010.

== Military career ==
Applegate was commissioned into the Royal Artillery in 1974.

Between 1992 and 1994 he was military assistant and speechwriter to three different Supreme Allied Commanders Europe and then became commanding officer 19th Regiment Royal Artillery – The Highland Gunners. After a staff appointment where he was responsible for conceptual development of the British Army, he moved on to be commander Royal Artillery for 3rd Division followed by an appointment as Director of Equipment Capability.

In 1995 he was deployed at short notice with his artillery regiment to Bosnia, initially under command UNPROFOR, then as commander of the UK/FR/NL artillery group within the ad hoc UNPROFOR Rapid Reaction Force and finally, after the Dayton Agreement, he was assigned to the Allied Rapid Reaction Corps. His artillery group based in Sarajevo and on Mount Igman provided surveillance, targeting and indirect fire in support of UNPROFOR and NATO's Operation Deliberate Force. In 1999 he was deputy commander of the British Forces entering Kosovo. In 2004 he was appointed Capability Manager for Battlefield Manoeuvre and in June 2006 he became Master-General of the Ordnance.

In February 2007 he became Chief of Materiel (Land) and a Main Board member of the new Defence Equipment and Support organisation, with specific responsibility for Defence's supply chain and support to operations in Iraq and Afghanistan. He also became quartermaster-general. He moved on from this post in September 2009 to become a Defence Career Partner on attachment to a number of international companies in preparation to compete for the post of Chief of Defence Materiel for the UK MoD.

He is also a colonel commandant of the Royal Artillery and honorary colonel of 19th Regiment, Royal Artillery.

Applegate was appointed Companion of the Order of the Bath (CB) in the 2010 Birthday Honours and Officer of the Order of the British Empire (OBE) in the 1996 Operational Honours List. He was awarded the US Legion of Merit (Officer Degree) in 2007 and was made a Legionnaire de 1ère classe in 1996 for combat command of Foreign Legion troops in Bosnia.

Military offices
Preceded by Andrew Figgures	Master-General of the Ordnance; 2006	Succeeded by Chris Wilson
Preceded by Timothy Tyler	Quartermaster-General to the Forces; 2007–2009	Succeeded by Gary Coward
