= Andrew Figgures =

British Army general

Lieutenant General Andrew Figgures CB CBE FREng
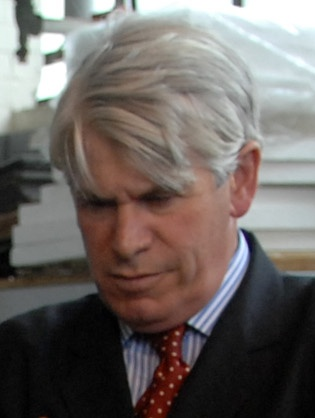
- Figgures in 2008
- Born: 13 November 1950 (age 75)
- Military career
- Allegiance: United Kingdom
- Branch: British Army
- Service years: 1970–2009
- Rank: Lieutenant General
- Conflicts: Bosnian War; Iraq War
- Awards: Companion of the Order of the Bath; Commander of the Order of the British Empire

Lieutenant General Andrew Collingwood Figgures CB CBE FREng (born 13 November 1950) is a former Master-General of the Ordnance.

== Military career ==
Educated at Loughborough Grammar School, Welbeck College and St Catharine's College, Cambridge, Figgures was commissioned into the Royal Electrical and Mechanical Engineers in 1970.

In 1995 he was appointed Commander of Equipment Support at HQ Land Command from where he was deployed to Bosnia for which he was awarded the CBE.

In 1998 he went to the Royal College of Defence Studies and was then appointed Director of Operational Requirements (Land). In 2000 he was appointed as Capability Manager for Manoeuvres and then in September 2003 he was deployed to Iraq as Senior British Military Representative and Deputy Commanding General, Multinational Force, Iraq. In 2004 he became Technical Director at the Defence Procurement Agency and Master-General of the Ordnance. Then in 2006 he became Deputy Chief of the Defence Staff (Equipment Capability). He retired in October 2009.

In March 2010 he became Chief executive of the British Transport Police Authority. In 2012 a new post of Master General REME was created with Figgures as the first incumbent.

Military offices
Preceded by Freddie Viggers	Senior British Military Representative and Deputy Commanding General, Multinational Force, Iraq; 2003–2004	Succeeded by John McColl
Preceded by Peter Gilchrist	Master-General of the Ordnance; 2004–2006	Succeeded by Dick Applegate
Preceded by Robert Fulton	Deputy Chief of the Defence Staff (Equipment Capability); 2006–2009	Succeeded by Paul Lambert
