= 1350 Rosselia =

Asteroid

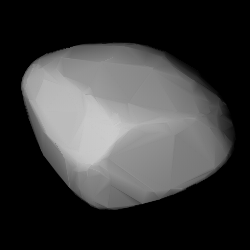
- Shape model of Rosselia from its lightcurve

Discovery
- Discovered by: E. Delporte
- Discovery site: Uccle Obs.
- Discovery date: 3 October 1934

Designations
- Named after: Marie-Thérèse Rossel (editor of Le Soir)
- Alternative designations: 1934 TA · 1926 AF; 1929 TN · 1929 VH; 1934 VA · 1938 OC; 1948 QG · 1949 YY; A924 TB
- Minor planet category: main-belt · (outer); Koronis

Orbital characteristics
- Epoch 4 September 2017 (JD 2458000.5)
- Uncertainty parameter 0
- Observation arc: 88.09 yr (32,176 days)
- Aphelion: 3.1133 AU
- Perihelion: 2.6007 AU
- Semi-major axis: 2.8570 AU
- Eccentricity: 0.0897
- Orbital period (sidereal): 4.83 yr (1,764 days)
- Mean anomaly: 65.352°
- Mean motion: 0° 12^{m} 14.76^{s} / day
- Inclination: 2.9392°
- Longitude of ascending node: 139.55°
- Argument of perihelion: 237.70°

Physical characteristics
- Dimensions: 20.822±0.185 km 21.083±0.147 km 21.22±0.38 km 22.60±3.16 km 23.35±1.7 km
- Synodic rotation period: 6.0 h 8.1394±0.0002 h 8.140±0.001 h 8.14±0.05 h 8.14008±0.00001 h 8.14011±0.00005 h 8.16±0.01 h
- Geometric albedo: 0.1579±0.025; 0.185±0.314; 0.1960±0.0511; 0.199±0.008; 0.199±0.022
- Spectral type: Tholen = S SMASS = Sa; B–V = 0.854; U–B = 0.373
- Absolute magnitude (H): 10.36±0.25 (R) · 10.67±0.06 · 10.68 · 10.78 · 10.81±0.01

1350 Rosselia, provisional designation 1934 TA, is a stony Koronian asteroid from the outer regions of the asteroid belt, approximately 22 kilometers in diameter. Discovered by astronomer Eugène Delporte at the Royal Observatory of Belgium in 1934, the asteroid was later named after Marie-Thérèse Rossel, editor of the Belgian newspaper Le Soir.

== Discovery ==
Rosselia was discovered on 3 October 1934, by Belgian astronomer Eugène Delporte at the Royal Observatory of Belgium in Uccle. One month later, it was independently discovered by German astronomer Richard Schorr at the Bergedorf Observatory, Hamburg, on 3 November 1934. The Minor Planet Center only recognizes the first discoverer. The asteroid was first identified as A924 TB at the Simeiz Observatory in October 1924.

== Orbit and classification ==
Rosselia is a member of the Koronis family (605), a very large asteroid family with nearly co-planar ecliptical orbits in the outer main belt. It orbits the Sun at a distance of 2.6–3.1 AU once every 4 years and 10 months (1,764 days; semi-major axis of 2.86 AU). Its orbit has an eccentricity of 0.09 and an inclination of 3° with respect to the ecliptic.

The body's observation arc begins at Lowell Observatory in September 1929, or five years prior to its official discovery observation at Uccle.

== Physical characteristics ==
In the Tholen classification, Rosselia is a common S-type asteroid. In the SMASS classification it is an Sa-subtype that transitions to the rare A-type asteroids.

=== Rotation period and poles ===
Several rotational lightcurve of Rosselia have been obtained from photometric observations since 1975. Consolidated lightcurve-analysis gave a well-defined rotation period of 8.140 hours with a brightness amplitude between 0.3 and 0.54 magnitude (U=3).

Modeling of the asteroid's lightcurve gave two concurring periods of 8.14008 and 8.14011 hours, with two determined spin axis of (67.0°, −64.0°) and (246.0°, −58.0°) in ecliptic coordinates (λ, β).

=== Diameter and albedo ===
According to the surveys carried out by the Infrared Astronomical Satellite IRAS, the Japanese Akari satellite and the NEOWISE mission of NASA's Wide-field Infrared Survey Explorer, Rosselia measures between 20.822 and 23.35 kilometers in diameter and its surface has an albedo between 0.1579 and 0.199.

The Collaborative Asteroid Lightcurve Link adopts the results obtained by IRAS, that is, an albedo of 0.1579 and a diameter of 23.35 kilometers based on an absolute magnitude of 10.78.

== Naming ==
This minor planet was named after Marie-Thérèse Rossel (1910–1987), a Belgian businesswoman and editor of the Brussels newspaper Le Soir. The official naming citation was mentioned in The Names of the Minor Planets by Paul Herget in 1955 (H 122). Asteroid 1366 Piccolo was also named after an editor of Le Soir by Delporte.
