= Marie-Thérèse Rossel =

Marie-Thérèse Rossel (1 February 1910 – 18 June 1987) was a Belgian newspaper editor and businesswoman who headed the Rossel publishing company for fifty years.

Born in Ixelles, her father Victor Rossel was editor and manager of Le Soir, a French language newspaper published in Belgium founded by Victor's father Émile Rossel. During the First World War and the occupation of Belgium by Germany, the family went into exile at Bournemouth in England. On their return, Marie-Thérèse worked in the family business and succeeded her father as head of the family company on his death in 1935 when she was aged only 25. She headed the company in its various forms until her death.

Until 1946 Le Soir was edited by her appointee, lawyer Lucien Fuss, but Marie-Thérèse took on the editorial direction of the newspaper on Fuss's death and edited the paper until 1969 when she handed over to son-in-law Jean Corvilain.

She oversaw a considerable expansion of the Rossel business, an expansion which later led to conflict with French publisher Robert Hersant, owner of Le Figaro, who became a significant minority investor in Rossel in the 1980s.

== Honors ==
She was the recipient of several honors including the Order of Leopold and the French Legion of Honour. The asteroid 1350 Rosselia, discovered by astronomer Eugène Delporte in 1934 was named in her honor.
