= Žarko Todorović =

- Жарко Тодоровић
- Žarko Todorović in French Foreign Legion uniform, ca. 1970s
- Born: 24 January 1907; Belgrade, Kingdom of Serbia
- Died: 2004 (aged 96–97); Paris, France
- Relatives: Boško Todorović (brother); Slivko Todorović (brother)
- Military career
- Allegiance: Kingdom of Yugoslavia (1907 – April 1941); Chetniks (May 1941–1945); France (1945–2000)
- Branch: Army
- Rank: Lieutenant colonel
- Nickname: Valter

Žarko P. Todorović "Valter" (24 january 1907 Belgrade – 2004 Paris) was one of the leaders of the Chetnik resistance in the first phase of World War II in the German occupied Yugoslavia, serving as first commander of the undercover Chetnik headquarters in Belgrade.

== Early life ==
Todorović was born in Belgrade in 1907. He attended a Military Academy for both primary and secondary education and later attended the esteemed École Militaire in Paris, France for officer training. There, Todorović attended classes taught by Charles de Gaulle.

Before the Second World War, Todorović was a major in the army of the Kingdom of Yugoslavia, working in the intelligence of the Supreme Command.

== Invasion of Yugoslavia (April–July 1941) ==
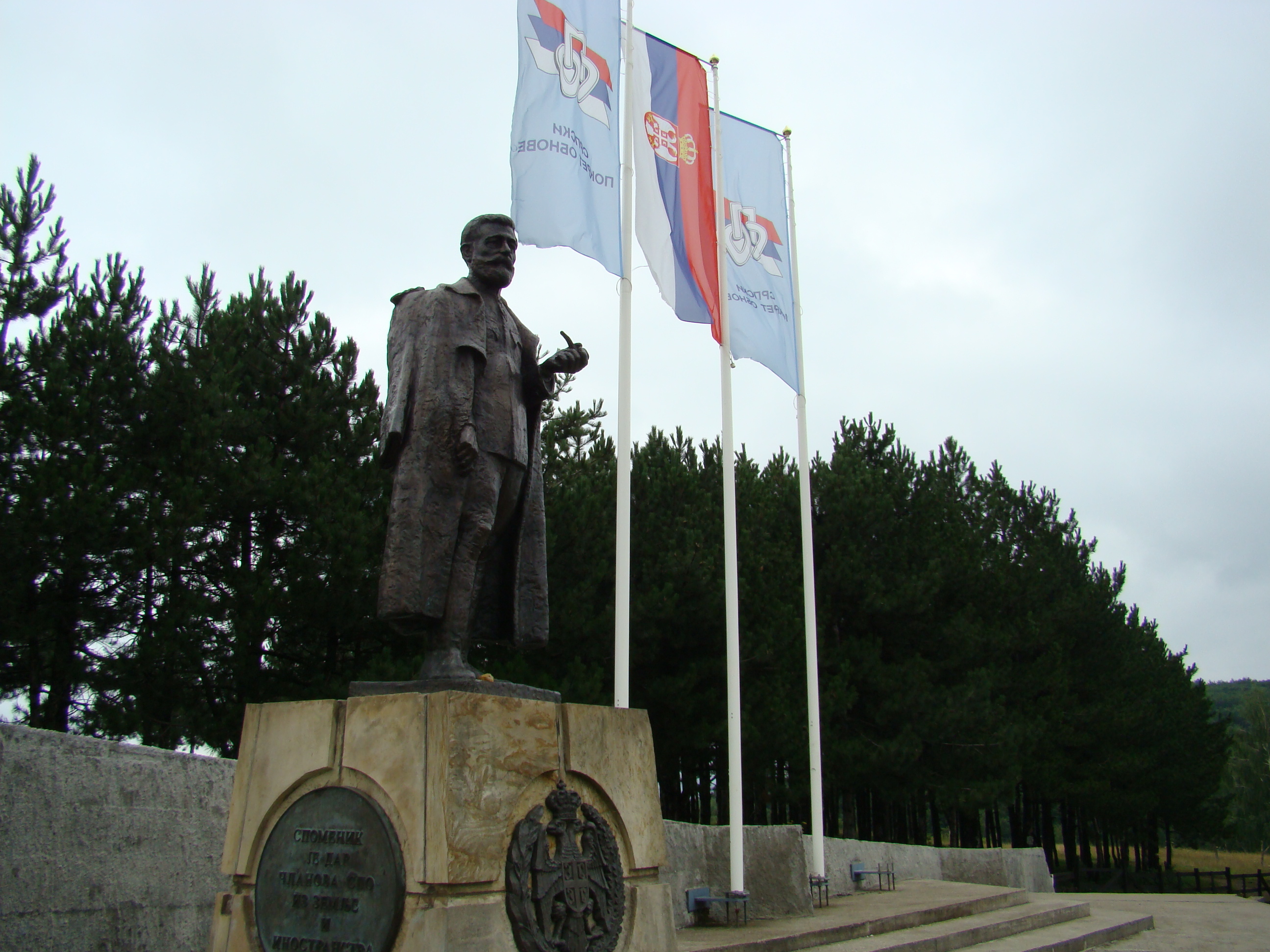
Monument to Draža Mihailović on Ravna gora

With the onset of the invasion of Yugoslavia in 1941 (also known as the April War), Todorović, now at the rank of lieutenant colonel, was sent to the area to assist resistance fighters, known collectively as the Chetniks. He joined the Ravna Gora Movement, a resistance cell led by Dragoljub "Draža" Mihailović, serving as a communications officer.

In May 1941, Todorović delivered an invitation to Dragomir Jovanović to join the Chetniks. Jovanović turned down the offer, and was later convicted of collaborating with German official and executed.

Žarko relayed information between the Chetnik movement with British Intelligence and Yugoslav government-in-exile. He sent a report regarding the organized resistance on Ravna Gora against the German occupation. This report included the initials of the commander of the uprising (D.M.) and provided short and long wave frequencies for further communication. The message bore the signature of General Staff Major Z.P.T., whose handwriting was recognized to be of Žarko Todorović. At his 1946 trial, Mihajlović stated that Todorović also made contact with the American Legation.

Todorović also organized radio communication between Stanislav Rapotec and Mihajlović. Jovan Đonović, a delegate of the Yugoslavian government-in-exile, reported to Masterson, the chief of the Belgrade mission of British intelligence, that Todorović (code-name ZPT — from Žarko P Todorović) contacted the committee of thirty-two (the Central National Revolutionary Committee).

In July 1941, upon expanding the influence of the Ravna Gora Movement cell, Mihajlović gave Todorović command of the northern province, based in Belgrade. In this position, Todorović started with activities aimed to establish Chetnik undercover operations in German-occupied Belgrade.

== First arrest ==
Within a month of commanding the Belgrade Chetnik headquarters, Germans managed to break the code Todorović used to communicate with Mihajlović's headquarters, and were able to locate and arrest Todorović at the end of July 1941. However, Todorović soon escaped. Against the order of the Supreme Command, he transferred command of the Belgrade headquarters to Major Radoslav Đurić, and went to Croatia. Since the command was often target of Gestapo activities, its leadership frequently changed; after Đurić, command was given to Dušan Manojlović, then Saša Mihajlović, and then again back to Žarko Todorović, who had returned to Belgrade.

== Second and third arrest ==
In February 1943, the Belgrade Gestapo arrested Todorović after an illegal radio station was discovered. He was transported to Zagreb for further interrogation and again managed to escape from the prison due to the help of Ustaše intelligence officer Zvonko Katalinić and an officer in the Croatian Ministry of Internal Affairs. After Todorović was released he was used by Hans Helm, a German attache with the Croatian Ministry of Internal Affairs, to trace other members of his intelligence network. They used their agent Radoslav Spitler to infiltrate the Chetniks, acting as Todorović's courier. Spitler delivered to Helm copies of all Todorović's correspondence with the headquarters in Belgrade. As soon as Helm collected the data regarding Todorović's intelligence network, he arrested him again and sent him to the Mauthausen concentration camp on September 9, 1943. Todorović survived in Mauthausen for six months until the end of the war, managing to make a vegetable garden - the produce of which he shared with other inmates.

== After Second World War ==
After being liberated, Todorović joined the French Foreign Legion, retaining the rank of Lt. Colonel. During his ten years of service, he fought in Indochina, including the war in Vietnam. After his service, he acquired French citizenship and was admitted to the General Staff of the French Army until he retired in the ranks of Colonel General Staff.

Todorović died in Paris 2004.

== Legacy ==
In the 2000s a series of reports was published in newspapers in Serbia, emphasizing that Todorovic's biography was inspiration for a famous Serbian TV series, Otpisani.

== Sources ==
- Robertson, Dr K G (27 July 1999). War Resistance and Intelligence. Pen and Sword. ISBN 978-1-4738-2048-7.
- Newman, John Paul (25 June 2015). Yugoslavia in the Shadow of War: Veterans and the Limits of State Building, 1903–1945. Cambridge University Press. ISBN 978-1-107-07076-9.
- Deroc, Milan (1997). By the Pen, the Sword, and Dagger: Biography of Captain Derok, a Leader of the 1941 Uprising in German Occupied Serbia. Ed. Marie-Renée Morin.
- Milovanović, Nikola B. (1984). Kontrarevolucionarni pokret Draže Mihailovića. Izdavačka radna organizacija "Rad".
