= Radomir Pavitchevitch =

Radomir Pavitchevitch (17 December 1908 – 24 July 2005) was a French legionnaire, veteran of World War II.

He enlisted for five years on 9 December 1931, and was assigned to the 2nd Foreign Legion Regiment at Oujda, Algeria. Even though released from the service, he rejoined the Legion at Beyrouth, in the 6th Foreign Legion Regiment during its creation, on 1 October 1939. In March 1941 he earned the sous-officier rank in the Levant Foreign Legion Regiment.

He then enlisted again to fight for the Free French Forces, and was attached to the 13th Foreign Legion Demi-Brigade (DBLE). He fought in the Phalange Magnifique (the wonderful phalanx, nickname of the DBLE) during the North African campaign, and earned the grade of sergent-chef.

He served as a section commander under capitaine Pierre Messmer, who was at the time, a company commander in the 13. At the end of the siege of Bir Hakeim, all the French units received the order to force the blocus, at night, to break through German lines. Pavitchevitch and his 5 légionnaires, who stayed in the fort to cover their companions, were missing. Five days later, they reappeared, leading a column of twenty Afrika Korps prisoners.

Next, he landed in Italy, thereafter in France in 1944 as a section commander. He was exceptionally promoted as adjudant-chef on 11 November 1945 and retired from active duty on 18 December 1947. He died on 24 July 2005.

== Awards ==
Knight of the Légion d'honneur and médaillé militaire, the adjudant-chef Pavitchevitch received the Croix de guerre 1939-1945 with a palm and 4 stars (two of vermeil, one of silver, and one of bronze).

== Sources ==
- Képi blanc, the official monthly publication of the French Foreign Legion
- Division of history and cultural heritage of the French Foreign Legion
