= Alex Rowe (soldier) =

British member of the French Foreign Legion

- Born: 11 November 1966 (age 59); Newcastle upon Tyne, United Kingdom
- Relatives: Twin brother Mark, Captain in the Royal Engineers
- Military career
- Allegiance: France
- Branch: French Foreign Legion
- Service years: 1987–present day
- Rank: Sergeant Major
- Service number: 174403
- Conflicts: Bosnia, Central African Republic, Ivory Coast, Afghanistan
- Awards: Five citations for bravery , and the Chevalier of the Légion d'honneur

Sergeant Major (Note: French: Major) Alex Rowe (born 11 November 1966) is a British member of the French Foreign Legion, one of the most decorated members of the Legion and the first British legionnaire to be invested into the Légion d'honneur, France's highest order of merit. Born and raised in England, he was unable to join the British Army at age 17 on medical grounds, and instead elected to join the Foreign Legion at age 20. After 23 years service, Rowe reached the second highest level of rank among the corps of non-commissioned officers in the French Army, and had been awarded five citations for acts of bravery in operational theatres around the world, culminating in 2010 with the Légion d'honneur for a second tour of Afghanistan.

== Early life ==
Alex Rowe and his twin brother, Mark, were born in Newcastle upon Tyne on 11 November 1966. He was raised in Gloucestershire, living in Stonehouse near Stroud, attending Maidenhill School in Stonehouse. As a teenager he joined the Stroud Army Cadets, and held a long-standing ambition to join the armed forces.

Aged 17, Alex applied with his brother Mark to join the British Army. Mark was successful but Alex, having already been accepted by the Royal Military Academy Sandhurst, was rejected on medical grounds, due to an eye condition. He had suffered a detached retina which was operated on when he was 13.

Following his rejection by the British Army, Rowe contemplated running away to the French Foreign Legion at age 18, but was persuaded not to by his mother. At age 19 he was also declined by the police force due to his eye condition. For a time before joining the Legion, Rowe ran a pub in Stroud.

== Military career ==
In 1987, shortly before his 21st birthday, and this time with his mother's agreement, Rowe travelled to Marseille and signed up for the Legion. Having just a rudimentary knowledge of the French language, Rowe was required to learn on the job during basic training, during which the speaking of other languages is not permitted under pain of a "clip round the ear".

Despite his eye condition, after passing basic training he was then trained as a sniper, becoming a top marksman. Rowe went on to see action in Bosnia, Kosovo, central Africa, the Ivory Coast and Afghanistan. Following service in Chad, Rowe was deployed as part of the United Nations Protection Force keeping open a corridor out of Sarajevo during the 1990s breakup of Yugoslavia. Rowe was deployed to the Ivory Coast in 2003. Around that time the region was experiencing the Ivorian Civil War, leading to the United Nations Operation in Côte d'Ivoire mission.

Rowe was deployed on his first tour to Afghanistan in 2008, as part of the International Security Assistance Force, serving with an Afghan battalion that sustained heavy casualties. In his second tour of Afghanistan in 2009, Rowe was part of a 700 strong Legion force under Colonel Benoît Durieux, based in Surobi, east of the capital Kabul. This force was deployed to exert Afghan authority over the upper Uzbin Valley in eastern Kabul Province, in order to cut an insurgent route from Pakistan, and together with French regulars and American troops, also in the Tagab Valley in neighbouring Kapisa Province, in order to allow completion a strategic ring road linking eastern and northern Afghanistan.

In December 2009 Rowe was profiled by the media as part of the Legion's role in ISAF, named as just Alex due to the legion's restrictions on reporting legionnaire's last names, either real or assumed, in the cases where recruits join under new identities. In addition to Rowe, this Legion force in Afghanistan also included a handful of Britons, including other profiled Chief Adjutants such as a 43-year-old Scottish legionnaire and a 52-year-old legionnaire from Liverpool.

Having served two tours in Afghanistan, Rowe returned to France in early 2010 to teach at the Legion training camp near Toulouse in the south of France, instructing younger legionnaires on a sniper course.

== Citations ==
After twenty three years of exemplary service in the Legion, in 2010 Rowe was to be awarded a fifth citation for bravery -and investiture as a Chevalier (Knight) of the French Légion d'honneur (the National Order of the Legion of Honour), for acts of valour during his second tour in Afghanistan. The news of the award was announced in January 2010, while Rowe was to receive his Légion d’Honneur badge in a ceremony in Paris during the Bastille Day celebrations on 14 July 2010.

Rowe's first citation came for service in Sarajevo, when he guided a mother and daughter to safety away from sniper fire being trained onto a city plaza. His third citation came for a sniper kill. Rowe's fifth citation came for his actions during an airborne insertion and night-time raid on a small village undertaken alongside American forces. After their extraction was delayed, the force was ambushed from all sides at 1am, and Rowe coordinated a helicopter counter-attack and medical evacuation of wounded Americans, with the first evacuation hit by rocket-propelled grenade fire. This action was close to the scene of the Uzbin Valley ambush of August 2008 in which the regular French forces suffered their worst death toll in the Afghan conflict.

According to The Times, this fifth citation made Rowe one of the most highly decorated of all legionnaires, and the Légion d’Honneur is an honour unheard of for an English legionnaire. According to Rowe, "Most guys will have one citation, some will have two. Three is very rare." Playing down his military record, he simply states of his service that "I haven't done anything more than my job."

== Personal life ==
Rowe's mother Jennifer is from Rodborough near Stroud and works for the police in Gloucestershire Constabulary, and is a trade union official for UNISON; in the 2009 Birthday Honours she was appointed Member of the Order of the British Empire "for services to the Police and to the Voluntary Sector." His father is a retired sales rep. In addition to his twin Mark, Rowe also has a younger brother Jeremy, a merchant banker in the City of London.

Much of Rowe's career in the Legion has been spent in Francophone Africa. As of 2010, his last visit to England had been in 2003 with the Legion, for training sniper course with the British Army- 1ST PWRR on Salisbury Plain. Rowe now lives near Nîmes in the south of France, with his French wife Elyzabeth, originating from Tahiti, with whom he has a son and a daughter. He plans to retire to Tahiti when he eventually leaves the Legion, having already completed the minimum term of service.

Despite being eligible after just three years service, Rowe has not taken up the option open of applying for French citizenship, stating that he feels neither "one hundred per cent British" nor French. As a result of his Newcastle origins and long service in the Legion, Rowe is said to possess an accent "veering between Geordie and French".

Initially, Rowe advanced through the lower ranks of the Legion at the same rate as his twin brother Mark, who had elected to join the Royal Engineers. He reached the senior non-commissioned officer rank of Sergeant Major, (Note: French: Major) equivalent to the British rank of Regimental Sergeant Major, whereas his brother has made the transition to the commissioned rank of Captain. Rowe speculated that had he been allowed to join the British Army, he would have been "at least a Colonel in the Parachute Regiment by now – if I was still alive, of course".

Having always been angry at not being able to join the British Army, Rowe said of the situation that "You can't get into the British army because you've got a f***ed eye, and you become a sniper in the French Foreign Legion. Something's gone wrong there." Although he said he had subsequently had a good life in the Legion, and had even been paid more while on holiday than his brother had while fighting in the Gulf War.

== See also ==
- List of Foreign Legionnaires
- List of Légion d'honneur recipients by name
