= Joint Chemical, Biological, Radiological and Nuclear Regiment =

Joint Chemical, Biological, Radiation and Nuclear Regiment
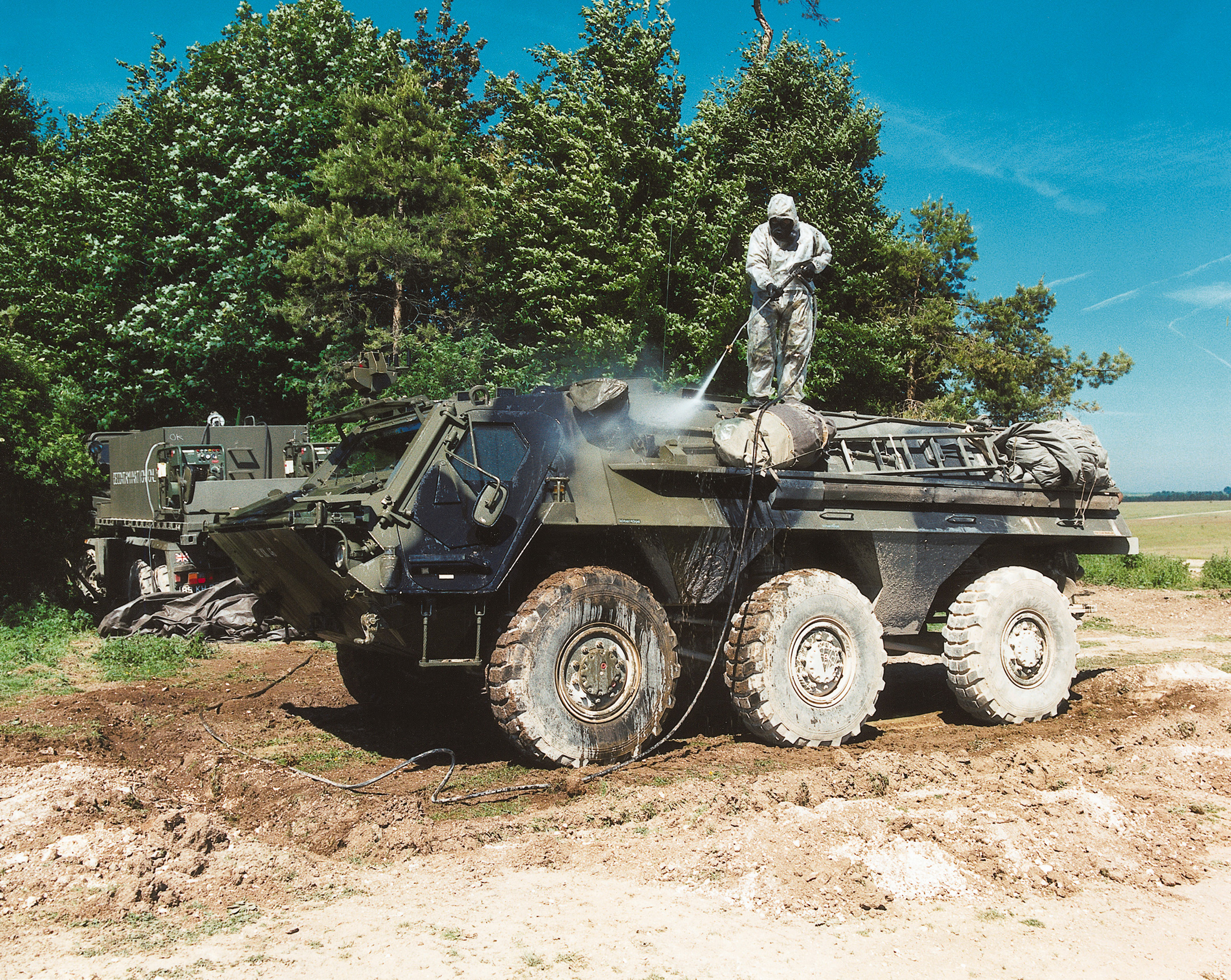
- A British Army TPz Fuchs Armoured Vehicle as was used by the Joint CBRN Regiment.
- Active: 1 April 1999 – 16 December 2011
- Country: United Kingdom
- Branch: Royal Air Force; British Army
- Type: Joint unit
- Role: Chemical, Biological, Radiation and Nuclear (CBRN) reconnaissance, detection and decontamination
- Part of: No. 2 Group (RAF)
- Home station: RAF Honington
- Motto: Fear Naught
- Colors: Brown, Red & Green
- Equipment: TPz Fuchs Armoured Vehicle

The Joint Chemical, Biological, Radiological and Nuclear Regiment was a specialist expeditionary unit of the British armed forces. Personnel of the Joint CBRN Regiment were trained in the detection, identification and monitoring of nuclear, biological and chemical weapons.

In 1994, the Royal Yeomanry, a regiment of the Territorial Army, was re-designated from its reconnaissance role to operate as the United Kingdom's first dedicated nuclear, biological and chemical (NBC) defence unit. Following the 1998 Strategic Defence Review, the NBC role was transferred to a newly formed joint regiment consisting of units from both the British Army and Royal Air Force. Formed on 1 April 1999 as the Joint NBC Regiment, from a stated recommendation in the Strategic Defence Review for an operational unit to support deployed forces of the British military in NBC defence and assistance. In 2005, the name of the regiment was changed following the addition of radiological weapons to its remit, and the NBC (Nuclear, Biological, Chemical) designation changed to CBRN.

There were five regular squadrons; four from the 1st Royal Tank Regiment and one (No. 27 Squadron) from the RAF Regiment. Two squadrons (A and W) from the Royal Yeomanry and, from March 2004, 2623 Squadron RAF Regiment provided a reserve capability.

On 21 July 2005, the name of the unit was changed from the Joint Nuclear Biological and Chemical Regiment (JNBCR) to the Joint Chemical, Biological, Radiological and Nuclear Regiment (JCBRNR).

Elements of the Joint CBRN Regiment have since operated in this role in Kuwait and Iraq (on Operation Telic, in which the Royal Yeomanry squadrons combined into a single unit named Y Squadron) and Afghanistan. The regiment contributed to operations world-wide during every year of its formation.

It was disbanded on 16 Dec 2011 as a result of the 2010 UK Strategic Defence and Security Review, with capabilities being transferred into the newly formed Defence CBRN Wing, formed by 26 and 27 Sqns RAF Regiment and 2623 Sqn RAuxAF Regiment. The FUCHS armoured vehicle was retired at this point.

The 1st Royal Tank Regiment then became divisional troops within 3rd Mechanised Division. Nevertheless, in 2014, the Royal Tank Regiment formed up with one squadron, Falcon Squadron, dedicated towards CBRN, and brought the FUCHS vehicles back into service in 2016.
