= Adrian Weale =

English writer

Adrian Weale (born 9 February 1964) is a British writer, journalist, illustrator and photographer of Welsh origin. He was educated at Latymer Upper School, University of York, Royal Military Academy Sandhurst and the Joint Services Command and Staff College.

== Biography ==
Weale was born in Knightsbridge, London. Prior to becoming a professional author, he served as an officer in the British Army Intelligence Corps. He was compulsorily mobilised for active service in Iraq in May 2003 and from July to December 2003 held the appointment of Deputy Governor of Dhi Qar province in southern Iraq, seconded from the staff of Multi-National Division (South-East) (Iraq) to the Coalition Provisional Authority. From September 2003 he supervised a number of democratic local elections in towns in Dhi Qar province, the first to be held in Iraq, as well as co-ordinating reconstruction projects and liaising with Coalition security forces. He was succeeded in this role, after an interregnum, by Rory Stewart.

One of his books, Renegades: Hitler's Englishmen gives a detailed account of British traitors and collaborators during World War II, including William Joyce, John Amery and the British Free Corps.

Weale is a founding member of the British Armed Forces Federation (BAFF).

== Works ==
- Fighting Fit: The SAS Fitness Guide (1993). ISBN 0-7528-0589-4
- Renegades: Hitler's Englishmen (1994). ISBN 0-297-81488-5
- Eyewitness: Hiroshima (1995). ISBN 1-85487-392-X
- Green-Eyed Boys: 3 Para and the Battle for Mount Longdon (1996). ISBN 0-00-255590-5
- Secret Warfare: Special Operations Forces from the Great Game to the SAS (1997)
- The Real SAS (1998). ISBN 0-283-06235-5
- Jihad!: The Secret War In Afghanistan (2000). ISBN 1840183268 (Ghost Writer)
- Patriot Traitors: Roger Casement, John Amery and the Real Meaning of Treason (2001). ISBN 0-670-88498-7
- Science and the Swastika (2001). ISBN 0-7522-1931-6
- The SS: A New History (2010). ISBN 978-1408703045
- Army of Evil: A History of the SS (2012). ISBN 9780451237910
