= David Hallifax =

Royal Navy Admiral (1927–1992)

Admiral Sir David Hallifax KCB KCVO KBE
- Born: 3 September 1927
- Died: 23 August 1992 (aged 64)
- Military career
- Allegiance: United Kingdom
- Branch: Royal Navy
- Service years: 1945–1988
- Rank: Admiral
- Commands: Royal College of Defence Studies; Deputy Supreme Allied Commander Atlantic; Flag Officer First Flotilla; HMS Fife; HMS Agincourt; MTB5008
- Conflicts: Suez Crisis; Falklands War
- Awards: Knight Commander of the Order of the Bath; Knight Commander of the Royal Victorian Order; Knight Commander of the Order of the British Empire
- Other work: Constable and Governor of Windsor Castle

Admiral Sir David John Hallifax, KCB, KCVO, KBE (3 September 1927 – 23 August 1992) was a senior Royal Navy officer who served as Constable and Governor of Windsor Castle from 1988 until 1992.

== Naval career ==
Hallifax was educated at Winchester College, joined Britannia Royal Naval College, Dartmouth as a cadet in 1945 and spent his early years in minesweepers based in the eastern Mediterranean. His first command was as a young lieutenant in the fast patrol boat MTB5008.

In 1954 Hallifax qualified as a Torpedo and Anti-Submarine Officer serving in HMS Salerno during the Suez Crisis in 1956 and later in HMS Whirlwind in the West Indies. He also commanded the destroyer HMS Agincourt at home and in East Asia before taking command of HMS Fife in 1973. Following an appointment to the Ministry of Defence as Director of Naval Operational Requirements, he became Flag Officer First Flotilla, a position once held by his father. It was from here that he went to the Northwood Headquarters as Chief of Staff to Admiral Sir John Fieldhouse, Commander-in-Chief Fleet in 1980. As Chief of Staff he was responsible for the day-to-day control of the Headquarters during the Falklands War. His next appointment was to the United States of America as the NATO Deputy Supreme Allied Commander Atlantic in 1982. His final appointment was Commandant of the Royal College of Defence Studies in 1986.

Hallifax retired from the navy on 1 March 1988. He was a keen yachtsman, competing in the 1971 Admirals Cup aboard the 'Prospect of Whitby'. He was a skilled woodworker, with a particular interest in fine reproduction furniture.

In February 1988 Hallifax was made Constable and Governor of Windsor Castle. He died of motor neurone disease in 1992.

Military offices
Preceded by Sir Cameron Rusby	Deputy Supreme Allied Commander Atlantic; 1982–1984	Succeeded by Sir Geoffrey Dalton
Preceded by Sir Michael Gow	Commandant of the Royal College of Defence Studies; 1986–1987	Succeeded by Sir Michael Armitage
Honorary titles
Preceded by Sir John Grandy	Constable and Governor of Windsor Castle; 1988–1992	Succeeded by Sir Patrick Palmer
