= Michael Armitage (RAF officer) =

British Royal Air Force commander (1930–2022)

Sir Michael Armitage
- Born: 25 August 1930
- Died: 25 December 2022 (aged 92)
- Military career
- Allegiance: United Kingdom
- Branch: Royal Air Force
- Service years: 1947–1990
- Rank: Air Chief Marshal
- Commands: Royal College of Defence Studies; Air Member for Supply and Organisation; Chief of Defence Intelligence; RAF Luqa; No. 17 Squadron
- Awards: Knight Commander of the Order of the Bath; Commander of the Order of the British Empire

Air Chief Marshal Sir Michael John Armitage, KCB, CBE (25 August 1930 – 25 December 2022) was a British senior Royal Air Force commander.

== RAF career ==
Educated at Newport Grammar School on the Isle of Wight, Armitage joined the Royal Air Force's Aircraft Apprentice Scheme at RAF Halton in 1947. As one of the top students to graduate from the aircraft apprentice scheme, Armitage was offered a cadetship to Cranwell, and he became a pilot, his first posting upon graduation in 1953 was on 28 Sqn at RAF Kai Tak. He was appointed Officer Commanding No. 17 Squadron in 1967 and Station Commander at RAF Luqa in 1972. He was then Director of Forward Policy in 1976, Deputy Commander of RAF Germany in 1978 and Senior RAF Representative on the Directing Staff at the Royal College of Defence Studies in 1980. He went on to be Director of Service Intelligence in 1982, Deputy Chief of Defence Staff (Intelligence) in 1983 and Chief of Defence Intelligence in 1984. Finally he became Air Member for Supply and Organisation in 1985, Commandant of the Royal College of Defence Studies in 1988 before retiring in 1990.

== Personal life and death ==
Following the dissolution of his first marriage he married Gretl Renate Steinig in 1970. He and his wife were active members of the Bath and County Club.

Armitage died on 25 December 2022, at the age of 92.

Military offices
Preceded by Sir James Glover	Deputy Chief of Defence Staff (Intelligence); 1983–1984	Post disbanded
New title	Chief of Defence Intelligence; 1984–1985	Succeeded by Sir Derek Boorman
Preceded by Sir Michael Knight	Air Member for Supply and Organisation; 1985–1987	Succeeded by Sir Patrick Hine
Preceded by Sir David Hallifax	Commandant of the Royal College of Defence Studies; 1988–1990	Succeeded by Sir Antony Walker
