= William Pillar =

Royal Navy Admiral (1924–1999)

Admiral Sir William Pillar GBE KCB FIMechE
- Born: 24 February 1924
- Died: 18 March 1999 (aged 75)
- Spouse: Ursula Ransley
- Military career
- Allegiance: United Kingdom
- Branch: Royal Navy
- Service years: 1942–1984
- Rank: Admiral
- Commands: Royal College of Defence Studies; Royal Naval Engineering College
- Conflicts: Second World War; Korean War
- Awards: Knight Grand Cross of the Order of the British Empire; Knight Commander of the Order of the Bath

Admiral Sir William Thomas Pillar, GBE, KCB, FIMechE(24 February 1924 – 18 March 1999) was a senior Royal Navy officer who served as Chief of Naval Support and a member of the Admiralty.

== Naval career ==
Educated at Blundell's School and latterly at the Royal Naval Engineering College, Pillar joined the Royal Navy as a cadet in 1942 during the Second World War. He was promoted to sub-lieutenant (Engineering Branch) on 1 June 1944. An acting lieutenant at the war's end, he was promoted to substantive lieutenant (E) on 3 June 1947 (seniority 1 October 1945). Following service in the Korean War he was promoted to lieutenant-commander (E) on 1 October 1953, to commander (E) on 31 December 1958 and to captain (E) on 31 December 1966.

Pillar was appointed Assistant to the Director-General, Ships in 1970 and Commander of the Royal Naval Engineering College in 1973. Attaining flag rank as a rear admiral on 7 January 1976, he was made Port Admiral at Rosyth and then Assistant Chief of Fleet Support. Promoted to vice admiral on 2 April 1979, he became the first Royal Navy engineer officer to be Chief of Fleet Support. He was appointed a Knight Commander of the Order of the Bath (KCB) in the 1980 Birthday Honours, and was promoted to admiral on 5 January 1982. In 1982, he became Commandant of the Royal College of Defence Studies. Appointed a Knight Grand Cross of the Order of the British Empire (GBE) in the 1983 Birthday Honours, he retired on 6 March 1984.

On retirement from the Royal Navy Pillar became Lieutenant-Governor and Commander-in-Chief of Jersey. He was also Commodore and later Life Vice-Commodore of the Royal Navy Sailing Association, a member of the Royal Yacht Squadron, President of the Royal Navy Modern Pentathlon Association and a Knight of St. John.

== Family ==
In 1946 Pillar married Ursula Ransley; they had three sons and a daughter.

Military offices
Preceded by Sir James Eberle	Chief of Fleet Support; 1979–1981	Succeeded by Sir James Kennon
Preceded by Sir Robert Freer	Commandant of the Royal College of Defence Studies; 1982–1984	Succeeded by Sir Michael Gow
Government offices
Preceded by Sir Peter Whiteley	Lieutenant Governor of Jersey; 1985–1990	Succeeded by Sir John Sutton
