= Michael Gow (British Army officer) =

British Army general (1924–2013)

General Sir Michael Gow GCB
- Born: James Michael Gow; 3 June 1924; Sheffield, Yorkshire, England
- Died: 26 March 2013 (aged 88); Edinburgh, Scotland
- Military career
- Allegiance: United Kingdom
- Branch: British Army
- Service years: 1942–1986
- Rank: General
- Service number: 278637
- Unit: Scots Guards
- Commands: Royal College of Defence Studies; British Army of the Rhine; General Officer Commanding, Scotland; 4th Division; 4th Guards Brigade; 2nd Battalion, Scots Guards
- Conflicts: Second World War; Malayan Emergency
- Awards: Knight Grand Cross of the Order of the Bath

General Sir James Michael Gow, GCB (3 June 1924 – 26 March 2013) was a senior British Army officer who served in the Second World War and reached high office in the 1980s, commanding the British Army of the Rhine.

== Military career ==
Born on 3 June 1924 in Sheffield, Yorkshire, England, Michael Gow was educated at Winchester College. Although his family lacked a military background, during the Second World War Gow volunteered for the British Army and enlisted into the Scots Guards in 1942. While at Caterham Barracks, the Scots Guards regimental depot, he was informed by his drill sergeant that he resembled a bag of manure tied up with pink string. However, he was soon commissioned as a second lieutenant on 5 June 1943, shortly after his nineteenth birthday. He served with the regiment's 3rd (Tank) Battalion, then part of the 6th Guards Tank Brigade. Serving in the campaign in Northwest Europe, including during the Battle of Normandy, Gow, after being injured in Belgium in October and taking six months to recover, was one of the first British officers into the Bergen-Belsen concentration camp in April 1945, shortly before Victory in Europe Day in May.

Gow remained in the army after the war and became commanding officer of the 2nd Battalion, Scots Guards, in 1964, later commanding the 4th Guards Brigade in 1967 before becoming a brigadier on the General Staff of Headquarters British Army of the Rhine in 1971. He was appointed general officer commanding 4th Division in 1973 and Director of Army Training in 1975.

Gow then moved on to be General Officer Commanding Scotland and Governor of Edinburgh Castle in 1979 and commander-in-chief of the British Army of the Rhine and the Northern Army Group in 1980. He was appointed Commandant of the Royal College of Defence Studies in 1984 and retired from the army in 1986. He was Aide-de-Camp General to The Queen from 1981 to 1984. He died on 26 March 2013.

== Personal life ==
In 1946 Gow married Jane Emily Scott. They had one son and four daughters. Lady Gow died in 2024 at the age of 99. He was the maternal grandfather of theatre and opera director Sophie Hunter.

Military offices
Preceded by Anthony Farrar-Hockley	GOC 4th Division; 1973–1975	Succeeded by Nigel Bagnall
Preceded by Sir David Scott-Barrett	GOC Scotland; 1979–1980	Succeeded by Sir David Young
Preceded by Sir William Scotter	C-in-C British Army of the Rhine; 1980–1983	Succeeded by Sir Nigel Bagnall
Preceded by Sir William Pillar	Commandant of the Royal College of Defence Studies; 1984–1986	Succeeded by Sir David Hallifax
