= Frank Simpson (British Army officer) =

British Army general

General Sir Frank Simpson GBE KCB DSO DL
- Major-General Simpson in 1944
- Born: 21 March 1899
- Died: 28 July 1986 (aged 87)
- Military career
- Allegiance: United Kingdom
- Branch: British Army
- Service years: 1916–1954
- Rank: General
- Nickname: "Simpo"
- Service number: 15429
- Unit: Royal Engineers
- Commands: Imperial Defence College (1952–1954); Western Command (1948–1951)
- Conflicts: First World War; Second World War
- Awards: Knight Grand Cross of the Order of the British Empire; Knight Commander of the Order of the Bath; Companion of the Distinguished Service Order; Mentioned in Despatches

General Sir Frank Ernest Wallace Simpson, GBE, KCB, DSO, DL (21 March 1899 – 28 July 1986) was a senior British Army officer during the 1940s.

== Military career ==
Born on 21 March 1899, Simpson was educated at Bishop Cotton Boys' School, Bedford School, Trinity Hall, Cambridge, and at the Royal Military Academy, Woolwich. He was commissioned into the Royal Engineers in May 1916. He served in the First World War in France and Belgium in 1918 and then after the war went to Afghanistan and the North West Frontier of India and attended the Staff College, Camberley from 1931 to 1932.

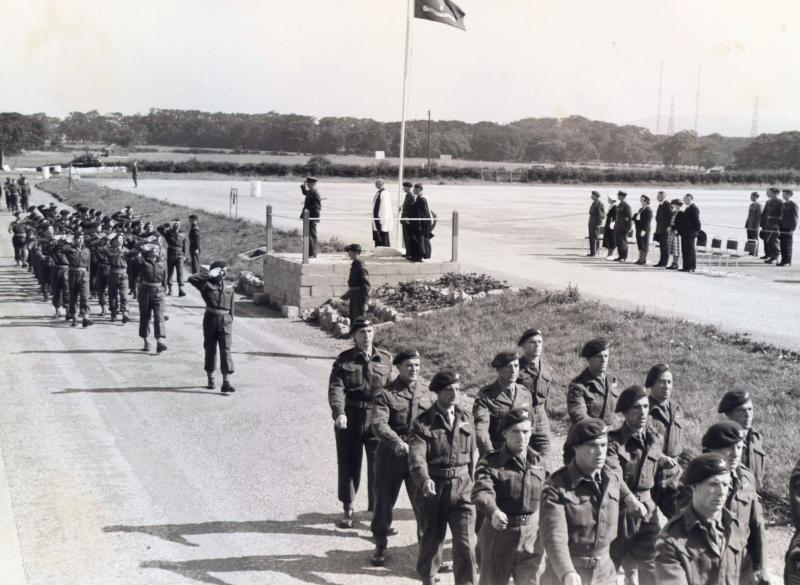
Men of the 16th Parachute Battalion march past Lieutenant General Sir Frank Simpson (stood near the centre, saluting), GOC-in-C Western Command, August 1949.

Simpson also served in the Second World War, initially in France and Belgium with the British Expeditionary Force and was involved in the defence of Arras and then the Dunkirk evacuation in 1940. He became chief of staff to Lieutenant General Bernard Montgomery in 1940 and then deputy director of Military Operations at the War Office in 1942 being promoted to Director of Military Operations in 1943.

After the war Simpson became Assistant Chief of the Imperial General Staff for Operations in 1945 and then Vice Chief of Imperial General Staff in 1946. In this role he fought cut-backs in the size of the army.

In 1948 Simpson was appointed General Officer Commanding-in-Chief Western Command and in 1952 he became Commandant of the Imperial Defence College: he retired in 1954. He was made Colonel of the Royal Pioneer Corps from 1950 to 1961.

== Retirement ==
In retirement Simpson became an advisor to the West Africa Committee, a body formed to promote British business interests in West Africa. He was a deputy lieutenant for Essex from 1956 and was Governor of the Royal Hospital Chelsea from 1961 to 1969. He was also a member of the Bath and County Club and wrote the Foreword to its history, published in 1983.

== Bibliography ==
- Smart, Nick (2005). Biographical Dictionary of British Generals of the Second World War. Barnsley, South Yorkshire: Pen and Sword Books. ISBN 1844150496.

Military offices
Preceded by Sir Archibald Nye	Vice Chief of the Imperial General Staff; 1946–1948	Succeeded by Sir Gerald Templer
Preceded by Sir Brian Horrocks	GOC-in-C Western Command; 1948–1951	Succeeded by Sir Cameron Nicholson
Preceded by Sir Charles Daniel	Commandant of the Imperial Defence College; 1952–1954	Succeeded by Sir Arthur Sanders
Honorary titles
Preceded by Sir Kenneth Crawford	Chief Royal Engineer; 1961–1967	Succeeded by Sir Charles Jones
Preceded by Sir Cameron Nicholson	Governor, Royal Hospital Chelsea; 1961–1969	Succeeded by Sir Charles Jones
