= John Kingwell =

Royal Navy Rear Admiral (born 1966)

Rear-Admiral John Kingwell CBE
- Born: 26 August 1966 (age 60)
- Military career
- Allegiance: United Kingdom
- Branch: Royal Navy
- Service years: 1984–2021
- Rank: Rear-Admiral
- Commands: HMS Pursuer; HMS Argyll; HMS Albion
- Awards: Commander of the Order of the British Empire

Rear-Admiral John Matthew Leonard Kingwell CBE (born 26 August 1966) is a retired Royal Navy officer. He was Commandant of the Royal College of Defence Studies from 2019 to 2020.

== Naval career ==
Kingwell joined the Royal Navy in 1984. He served as commanding officer successively of the patrol boat HMS Pursuer, the frigate HMS Argyll and the amphibious transport dock HMS Albion. He went on to be Commander United Kingdom Task Group in January 2011 and in that role commanded the task group off Libya. After that he became Head of Naval Resources and Plans in November 2011, Director of the Development, Concepts and Doctrine Centre in October 2013 and Deputy Commandant of the Royal College of Defence Studies in May 2016 before becoming Commandant of the Royal College of Defence Studies in July 2019. He handed over the post to George Norton on 21 July 2020, and retired from the navy in February 2021.

Kingwell was appointed Commander of the Order of the British Empire in the 2016 Birthday Honours.

Military offices
Preceded by Simon Gass	Commandant of the Royal College of Defence Studies; 2019–2020	Succeeded by George Norton
