= 2007 Special Honours =

British government recognitions

As part of the British honours system, Special Honours are issued at the Monarch's pleasure at any given time. The Special Honours refer to the awards made within royal prerogative, operational honours and other honours awarded outside the New Years Honours and Birthday Honours.

== Life Peer ==
=== Baronesses ===
- Susan Elizabeth, Lady Garden, Vice Chairman of Oxford University Society; Vice President of the Institute of Export; Liberal Democrat Candidate for Finchley and Golders Green 2005.
- Dame (Lilian) Pauline Neville-Jones, DCMG, Shadow Security Minister.
- Sayeeda Hussain-Warsi, Shadow Minister for Community Cohesion.

=== Barons ===
- The Right Honourable James Robert Wallace, QC, former Leader of the Scottish Liberal Democrats and former Member of the Scottish Parliament for Orkney.
