= Timothy Garden, Baron Garden =

British air marshal and peer (1944–2007)

The Right Honourable The Lord Garden
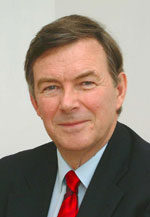
- Air Marshal The Lord Garden in 2006
- Born: 23 April 1944; Worcester, England
- Died: 9 August 2007 (aged 63); Hamstead, England
- Spouse: Susan Garden, Baroness Garden of Frognal
- Military career
- Allegiance: United Kingdom
- Branch: Royal Air Force
- Service years: c. 1965–1996
- Rank: Air Marshal
- Commands: Royal College of Defence Studies (1994–95); RAF Odiham (1985–87); No. 50 Squadron (1979–81)
- Awards: Knight Commander of the Order of the Bath; Knight of the Legion of Honour (France)
- Other work: Liberal Democrat peer

Member of the House of Lords
- Lord Temporal
- Life peerage 3 June 2004 – 9 August 2007

Personal details
- Party: Liberal Democrats

Timothy Garden, Baron Garden KCB (23 April 1944 – 9 August 2007) was a senior commander in the Royal Air Force (RAF) who later became a university professor and a Liberal Democrat politician.

Garden gained degrees from both Oxford and Cambridge universities. He was a pilot and then senior officer in the RAF for 32 years, retiring as an air marshal in 1996. He moved to academia and was Director at Chatham House before moving to university defence research. He became an adviser to the Liberal Democrats and was their defence spokesman in the House of Lords. He was married to Susan Garden, who was made a life peer as Baroness Garden of Frognal shortly after his death in 2007.

== Education and RAF career ==
Born in Worcester and educated at King's School, Worcester, Garden joined the Royal Air Force as a university cadet while at St Catherine's College, Oxford reading Physics. He was a member of the Oxford University Air Squadron from 1962 to 1965. He was a squadron pilot on No. 3 Squadron RAF flying English Electric Canberra B(I)8 light bombers in West Germany before becoming a flying instructor on Jet Provosts. He commanded a jet flying training unit, No. 50 Squadron RAF Avro Vulcan bomber squadron and a helicopter base.

Garden completed his staff training with the British Army, and did a postgraduate International Relations degree at Magdalene College, Cambridge. He spent three years as the Director of Defence Studies for the Royal Air Force, lecturing internationally on strategic studies. He was then appointed as station commander of RAF Odiham, where he flew the Westland Puma and Boeing Chinook helicopters. He then spent six years at the Ministry of Defence (MoD) on both the air and central staffs, including a period on the Air Force Board as Assistant Chief of the Air Staff. His last MoD appointment was as Assistant Chief of the Defence Staff (Programmes) with responsibility for long term defence programme planning for all three Services. He was subsequently appointed to be Commandant of the Royal College of Defence Studies and was in post for the 1994 and 1995 courses. He retired from the RAF in 1996 as an air marshal, apparently largely over a requirement that he and his family relocate in order to take up a proposed new post.

== Journalism, consulting, and academia ==
Garden was a web-site consultant before being appointed as Director of the Royal Institute of International Affairs at Chatham House, London. From mid-1998, he was a writer, broadcaster and lecturer, and undertook projects for the British Government, the US Department of Defense and NATO. He was joint chief editor for The Source, an internet public management journal, from 1999 to 2002. In 2000, he provided advice to the Palestinian Authority on negotiations with Israel under the auspices of the Adam Smith Institute. He was Distinguished Visiting Fellow and Scholar-in-Residence to Indiana University for the Spring 2001 Semester, and thereafter lectured there regularly by video. He returned to Indiana University Bloomington in early 2004 as the Herman B Wells Professor. He was visiting professor at the Centre for Defence Studies at King's College London from 2000, engaged in research projects on improving European defence capabilities, Defence Diplomacy, interoperability for NATO forces and counter-terrorism. He appeared as the military advisor on the BBC television series Crisis Command.

Garden wrote widely on security topics, and his publications include two books: Can Deterrence Last? and The Technology Trap, both written while he was a serving RAF officer. He wrote for a number of security-related projects, including developments in NATO, European defence, missile defence proposals and global security issues. He served as a member of the panel of experts for the UK government's 1998 Strategic Defence Review, and gave evidence to the Commons' Defence Select Committee on new threats after 11 September 2001.

== Liberal Democrat politician ==
In the 2000s, Garden was a member of the team developing defence policy for the Liberal Democrats, and was an adviser to the party's defence and foreign affairs policy teams. He was an elected member of the Liberal Democrat Federal Executive from 2003 to 2006, and of its Federal Policy Committee from 2003 to 2005. He became President of Liberal International British Group, and also of the Camden Liberal Democrats. He became a Liberal Democrat member of the House of Lords in June 2004: he was made a life peer as Baron Garden, of Hampstead in the London Borough of Camden. At the time of his death he was the party's defence spokesman in the Lords, and was a member of the Delegated Powers and Regulatory Reform Select Committee from 2004 to 2006. He was made a member of the Select Committee on Regulators, and was convenor of the All-Party Parliamentary Group on Global Security and Non-Proliferation. He became President of the Trading Standards Institute in April 2005.

In 2005 and 2006 Garden played a leading role in a cross-party campaign to facilitate electoral participation by armed forces personnel and their partners. According to his obituary in The Independent:

His great legacy is the Electoral Administration Bill, for which he secured cross-party support to overcome, in the face of dogged Ministry of Defence opposition, the problems of registration and voting for members of the armed forces and their partners.

== Memberships ==
Garden was a Fellow and Council Member of the Royal United Services Institute (FRUSI). He was an Honorary Fellow of St Catherine's College, Oxford, a Fellow and former Council Member of the Royal Aeronautical Society (FRAeS), a Fellow of City and Guilds of London Institute (FCGI) and an Associate Fellow of the Royal Institute of International Affairs. He was a member of the International Institute for Strategic Studies, the Fabian Society, the British Association for the Advancement of Science, the Foreign Policy Centre, the Centre for European Reform, the Pugwash Conferences, the UK Defence Forum, the Liberal Democrat European Group, the Centre:Forum, and the Anglo-Jordanian Society. He was also a member of advisory boards to the University of Hull Centre for Security Studies, the Königswinter Conference, the Oxford Research Group, and the Cambridge University Centre of International Studies. He was a member of the DERA Analysis Board between 1997 and 2000, and was the UK representative to the NATO Defence College in Rome from 1997 to 2001. He was Chairman of the Rippon Group, which acts a focus for EU issues, from 2000 to 2006, and was a Patron of Saferworld and Crisis Action. He was made an Honorary Fellow of the US Foreign Policy Association in 1997. He was a Commissioner on the Commission on Globalisation from 2002 to 2004. He was a member of the Beefsteak Club, the 63/68 Club, the National Liberal Club (of which he was also Vice Chairman), and the Royal Air Force Club.

Garden retained his connections with the Services as President of the London & South East Region Air Training Corps and as Hon Vice President of the RAF Rowing Club. He was President of the Combined Cadet Force Association from 2000 to 2003. He was a Liveryman of the Guild of Air Pilots and Air Navigators, President of the RAF Oxford & Cambridge Society, and was also a member of the RAF Historical Society. He was President of the Adastral Burns Club. He was a Founder Member of the British Armed Forces Federation.

== Personal life ==
Garden's father Joseph was an engineer. Garden had two daughters, Alexandra and Antonia, with his wife Susan (Sue), who stood for the Liberal Democrats in the Finchley and Golders Green constituency at the UK's 2005 general election. Shortly after his death the Government announced, on 13 September 2007, that a life peerage was to be conferred on Susan Garden (in her own right): she took her seat as The Baroness Garden of Frognal on 15 October 2007.

Garden's daughters are now known as Alexandra Whitfield (The Hon. Mrs Whitfield) (married Paul Whitfield) and Antonia Rolph (The Hon. Mrs Rolph) (married Jon Rolph).

== Death ==
Garden was diagnosed with incurable cancer and died just a few weeks later, on 9 August 2007, at the age of 63. According to press reports, he adopted a philosophical attitude to his illness, explaining to a friend how many of his fellow aircrew had had even less luck and were lost in their twenties and thirties.

Liberal Democrat leader Sir Menzies Campbell paid tribute to Lord Garden in a statement published on the party's website:

"Tim Garden has been an outstanding member of the Liberal Democrat team in the House of Lords where his wisdom and top level military experience were widely recognised. His advice to Charles Kennedy and myself during the Iraq war was invaluable. We have also lost a close friend who was an unfailingly generous and warm-hearted man. The whole party extends its deepest sympathy to his wife and family."

Liberal Democrat deputy leader in the House of Lords, Lord Wallace of Saltaire, echoed Campbell's words:

"Tim was both an expert and a radical, he offered invaluable advice on defence and foreign policy. He gave the Liberal Democrats depth in criticising the mistaken policy on Iraq, which was vitally important. He was also a very active parliamentarian, leading an all-party group on defence and conflict issues and on the delegated powers and instruments committee. We will miss him immensely."

== Honours ==
Garden was appointed a Companion of the Order of the Bath in 1992, and this was quickly advanced to Knight Commander in 1994. He was appointed as a Chevalier de l'Ordre National de la Légion d'Honneur by President Chirac in July 2003 for his work on European defence issues. Garden was elevated to the House of Lords in 2004, with bestowal of a life peerage as Baron Garden of Hampstead in the London Borough of Camden.

Military offices
Preceded by John Thomson	Assistant Chief of the Air Staff; 1991–1992	Succeeded by Anthony Bagnall
Preceded by T P J Boyd-Carpenter	Assistant Chief of the Defence Staff (Programmes); 1992–1994	Succeeded by G A Robertson
Preceded by Sir John Coward	Commandant of the Royal College of Defence Studies; 1994–1995	Succeeded by Scott Grant
