= Bay House School =

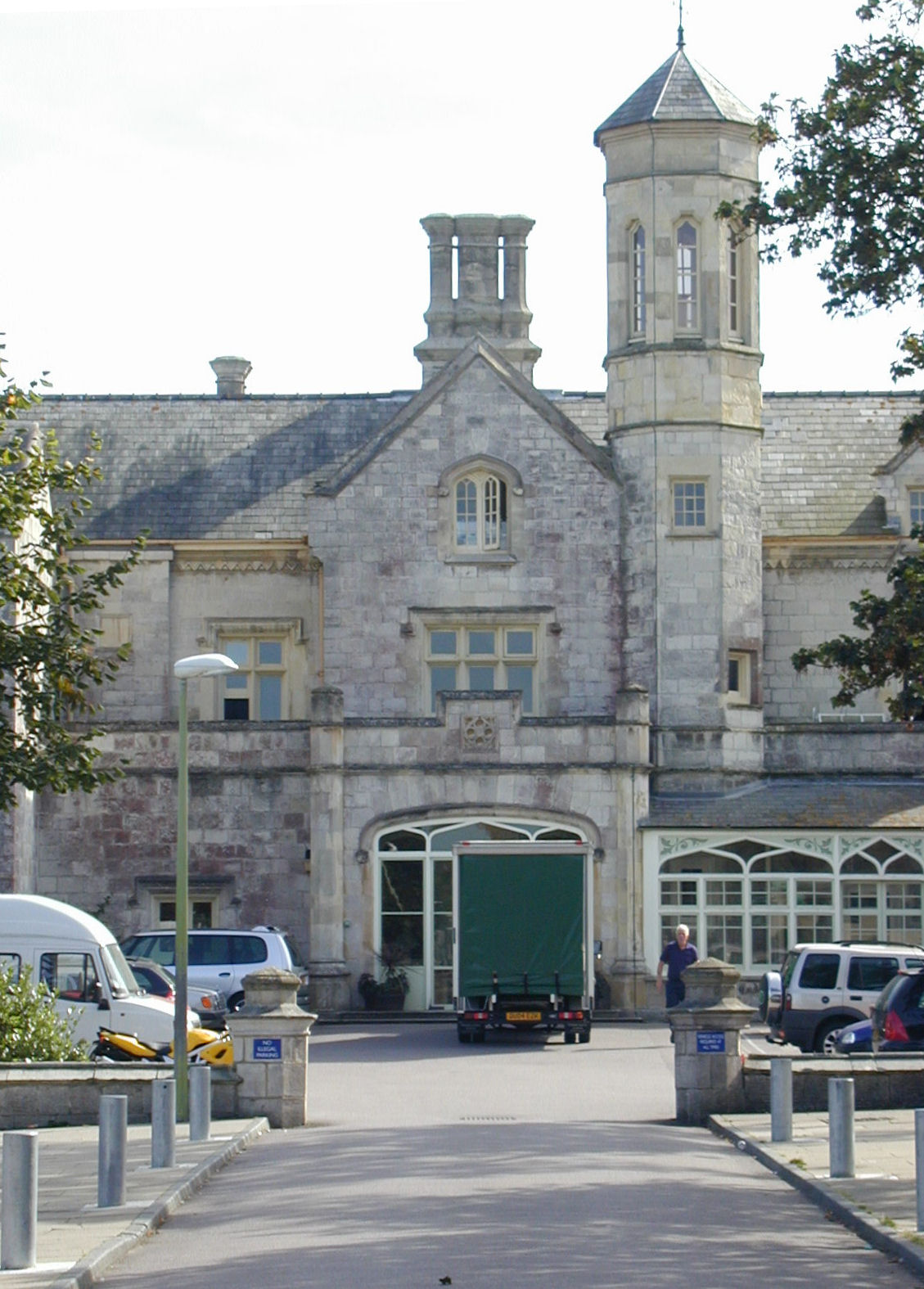

Location
- Gomer Lane; Gosport, Hampshire, PO12 2QP; England; 50°47′12″N 1°09′53″W

Information
- Type: Academy school
- Motto: We help each other
- Religious affiliation: None
- Established: 1972
- Local authority: Hampshire
- Trust: kings academies education Education
- Department for Education URN: 137791 Tables
- Ofsted: Reports
- Headteacher: Chris Willis
- Gender: Coeducational
- Age: 11 to 18
- Enrolment: 2143
- Houses: Gilkicker, Wallington, Brockhurst and Monkton
- Formerly: Gosport County Grammar School

Bay House School is a coeducational secondary school and sixth form located in Gosport, Hampshire, England.

== History ==
=== Normal school and grammar school ===
The Bay House site was originally a co-educational Normal School known as Gosport County Grammar School, which was founded in 1902.

The Grammar School was originally in the High Street, in a building of 1901. By 1951 the school was on four sites, including the Bay House site. The sites were amalgamated on the Bay House site in 1958.

=== Comprehensive ===
Bay House School, as it is today known, was established in 1972 through the amalgamation of Gosport Grammar School and Privett Secondary School. Sited adjacent to Stokes Bay, part of its premises occupies Bay House, built in 1838 by Decimus Burton as a seaside villa for Alexander Baring, 1st Baron Ashburton. The gardens of the house stretched all the way down to the sea at Stokes Bay as there was little more than a track in the way, which later became Stokes Bay Road.

John Croker, a friend of Lord Ashburton, was so impressed by the grounds that in 1842 he purchased the land next to Bay House and built his home there- Alverbank House, which later came to become the Alverbank Hotel.

Ashburton House, Gosport

From 'The Illustrated London News', 12 April 1863

The admiralty are about to take a lease of Lord Ashburton's mansion and grounds on the shore of Stokes Bay, which have recently been purchased by the War Department. It is the intention of the Admiralty, when they house and grounds are handed over to them, to fit the mansion up as a college for naval cadets.

In 1870, a naval college was established at Bay House, which became known as Ashburton House. Prince Alfred Ernest, Duke of Edinburgh, who was Queen Victoria's second son, attended the academy. He stayed at Alverbank House while he was studying there.

In 1892, Col. Francis Sloane-Stanley, a close friend of the Prince of Wales- who was later to become King Edward VII- took over the house.

In 1943 the house was sold to Gosport Borough Council, and the 17 acres of parkland were donated to the people of the borough.

Following World War II, the house became Gosport County Grammar School. The school was renamed Bay House School in 1972.

In a major fire in late 1984, the house, a grade II listed building, was badly damaged, but was subsequently restored to its current condition. The house re-opened to pupils in 1987.

The school has developed significantly since this time, including introducing a Sixth Form to the Gosport Area.

=== Academy ===
Previously a foundation school administered by Hampshire County Council, in January 2012 Bay House School converted to academy status. The school first joined a Multi-Academy Trust in 2017 when it became a founding member of GFM Education. In 2024, GFM Education was dissolved and merged with King's Group Academies.

== Teachers ==
The school has roughly 250 teachers. Some of the teachers appeared on the BBC Two quiz show Eggheads. In March 2010, the assistant head teacher, Jim Wood, told an education seminar in Portsmouth that school teachers should act like Dirty Harry. In 2010 former head of year James Braid was jailed for abusing boys throughout his 30-year career.

== Academic performance ==
In 2019, Bay House's Progress 8 and Attainment 8 measures at GCSE were both average. Absence and persistent absence were less good than the average.

In 2019, the average A level grade achieved by Bay House students was B−, which is above the England average of C+. A level progress was categorised as "well above average". Student retention was good, with 96% of students completing their main course of study, compared to 89% in Hampshire overall and 91% in England.

== Ofsted report 2022 ==
From the recent report in November 2022, Bay House received a "REQUIRES IMPROVEMENT" rating and some key messages from the report were:

- Bay House School (lower school, under 16) "have fallen short of previous high standards ".
- Post-16 (sixth form) outcomes have dipped in recent years.
- Bay House School "have not communicated [their] leadership structure effectively due to repeated changes being made unclear" .
- The pupils and students reported to inspectors frequent use of discriminatory language going unreported in school, with lack of awareness for minorities and other cultural backgrounds.

== Notable former pupils ==
- Air Chief Marshal Sir Robert Freer CBE, Commandant Royal College of Defence Studies from 1980 to 1982, AOC from 1975 to 1978 of No. 18 Group RAF and from 1972 to 1975 of No. 11 Group RAF, and Station Commander from 1963 to 1966 of RAF Seletar (in Singapore)
- Air Vice-Marshal David French CB MBE, Station Commander from 1988 to 1990 of RAF St Athan
- Richard Pike, Chief Executive of the Royal Society of Chemistry from 2006 to 2011
- Pam Rhodes, former presenter of Songs of Praise
- Matt Ritchie, professional football player for Newcastle United F.C. and Portsmouth F.C.
