= Pam Rhodes =

British television presenter and writer

- Born: 1950 (age 75–76)
- Education: Gosport County Grammar School
- Occupations: TV and radio presenter
- Known for: Songs of Praise
- Spouse: Richard Crow

Pam Rhodes (born September 1950) is an English television, radio presenter and author, known for presenting BBC Television's long-running religious series Songs of Praise since the early 1980s.

== Early life ==
Rhodes was born in 1950, and grew up in Gosport and attended Gosport County Grammar School. Her first job in television was in 1969 as programme secretary for Thames TV's Today which was hosted by Eamonn Andrews, going on to become programme organiser for the ITV network documentary series This Week.

== Career ==
In January 2015, Rhodes presented the "Songs of Dre's" feature on BBC Radio 2's "Dermot O'Leary Show".

Rhodes wrote a number of novels: With Hearts and Hymns and Voices (Lion Hudson); The Trespassers, Whispers, Ties That Bind and Letting Go (all for Hodder and Stoughton Publishers); Coming Through (Macmillan Publishing); Springtime at Hope Hall (2020), Summer's out at Hope Hall (2021) and Christmas at Hope Hall (2021) (all for Lion Fiction), Colours for the Soul, As Time Goes By and Love Bites (all quotation books for Lion Hudson) and Hear My Song (SPCK Publishing). Rhodes also wrote four novels as part of The Dunbridge Chronicles: Fisher of Men, Casting The Net, If You Follow Me and Saints And Sailors.

In 2020, Rhodes received the Thomas Cranmer Award for Worship from Justin Welby, Archbishop of Canterbury, "for her outstanding work in hosting Songs of Praise on the BBC for over 30 years."

== Personal life ==
Rhodes and her husband, Richard Crow, owned and ran Biggleswade Cat Lodge, a boarding cattery in Biggleswade in Bedfordshire, which also used to board and re-home RSPCA cats. She is a vice-president of the Church Army; patron of Livability and Methodist Homes for the Aged (the MHA Group); and an ambassador for Keech Hospice Care based in Great Bramingham Lane, Luton. She was made an honorary member of the Royal School of Church Music in 2009 and was awarded an honorary doctorate of arts for her contribution to news journalism and charity work by the University of Bedfordshire in 2010.
