= Richard Pike =

Richard Pike CEng CSci FRSC FInstP FIMechE FIChemE FIET FEI
- Born: 2 April 1950
- Died: 23 July 2011 (aged 61)
- Richard Pike's voice from the BBC programme Material World, 20 May 2010

Richard Andrew Pike FRSC (2 April 1950 – 23 July 2011) was the Chief Executive of the Royal Society of Chemistry (RSC) from 2006 to 2011.

== Education ==
He attended Gosport County Grammar School (which became the comprehensive, Bay House School, in 1972). From Downing College, Cambridge he gained a 1st Class BA in Engineering in 1971, and later in 1977 gained a PhD. His PhD research work investigated experimental and theoretical aspects of vapour bubble dynamics in boiling, focusing on the thermal and fluid characteristics of water and organic liquids in various gravitational fields, including Earth and zero gravity.

== Career ==
From being sponsored as an undergraduate, he had an almost 25-year career in BP, during which time he held a number of technical and commercial positions. These included Technical Manager of the Sullom Voe Terminal in Shetland, Scotland (then Europe's largest oil and gas processing facility), and General Manager, Chemicals, BP Far East. During this latter posting he was also appointed President, BP Chemicals, Japan, and Director, Samsung-BP Chemicals, South Korea.

After leaving Japan, Pike was for five years Director General of the Institution of Mechanical Engineers, and Executive Vice Chairman, Professional Engineering Publishing. He later moved to become Senior Associate at Gaffney, Cline & Associates, advising on corporate strategy within the oil and gas industry, and leading international technical, commercial and organisational assignments throughout the energy supply chain, from reservoir management to processing facilities, petrochemicals and power. He was also non-executive Director of Chemistry Innovation Ltd., the corporate vehicle for the Chemistry Innovation Knowledge Transfer Network (CIKTN). In February 2006 he was appointed as the Chief Executive of the RSC, which he resigned from in February 2011.

Pike was a Chartered Scientist and Chartered Engineer, and was elected Fellow of six learned bodies: Royal Society of Chemistry, Institute of Physics, Energy Institute, Institution of Mechanical Engineers, Institution of Chemical Engineers and Institution of Electrical Engineers (now Engineering and Technology). Pike was also a former recipient of the 'Award to Excellence' from the Institution of Plant Engineers, and a Freeman of the City of London. He authored numerous papers in the fields of science, education and training, engineering, and energy and climate change.

In February 2010, he criticised so-called Mickey Mouse university degrees.

He died on 23 July 2011.

== Other interests ==
A keen linguist and sportsman, Pike was President of the Cambridge University Anglo-Japanese Society, and in 1980 was the first person to swim between the most northerly islands of the British Isles, in Shetland, raising funds for medical research.
