= George Norton =

Retired British Army officer (born 1962)

Lieutenant General Sir George Norton KCVO CBE
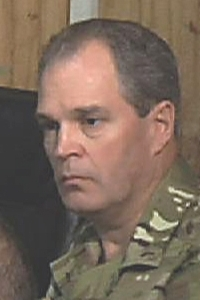
- Norton in 2010
- Born: 27 November 1962; Hammersmith, Greater London
- Military career
- Allegiance: United Kingdom
- Branch: British Army
- Service years: 1984–2020
- Rank: Lieutenant General
- Service number: 513733
- Unit: Grenadier Guards
- Commands: Household Division; London District; 38th (Irish) Brigade; 1st Battalion Grenadier Guards
- Conflicts: Operation Banner; War in Afghanistan
- Awards: Knight Commander of the Royal Victorian Order; Commander of the Order of the British Empire; Queen's Commendation for Valuable Service; Bronze Star Medal (United States)

Lieutenant General Sir George Pemberton Ross Norton, KCVO, CBE (born 27 November 1962) is a retired British Army officer. He was the UK Military Representative to NATO from 2016 to 2020, and has served as the Commandant of the Royal College of Defence Studies since 2020.

== Military career ==
After being educated at Radley College and St John's College, Cambridge, Norton studied at the Royal Military Academy Sandhurst and was commissioned into the Grenadier Guards on 1 July 1984. Promoted to captain on 27 November 1987, he attended the Military Academy of the German Armed Forces in Hamburg in 1993, before being promoted to major on 30 September 1994.

Norton was deployed to Bosnia and Herzegovina as Military Assistant to the Chief of Staff within Headquarters Implementation Force (IFOR) in 1997, for which he was appointed a Member of the Order of the British Empire in the 1998 New Year Honours. Promoted to lieutenant colonel on 30 June 2000, he joined the directing staff at the Joint Services Command and Staff College that year, and then became commanding officer of the 1st Battalion Grenadier Guards in 2002. Promoted to colonel on 30 June 2004, he was deployed to Afghanistan as Director Plans and Policy within the Combined Forces Command Afghanistan.

Norton was appointed Secretary of the Chiefs of Staff Committee at the Ministry of Defence in 2005 and attended the Higher Command and Staff Course at the Staff College, before being deployed to Afghanistan again in early 2007 as Deputy Commander of Task Force Helmand and being advanced to Commander of the Order of the British Empire for his services there.

Promoted to brigadier on 30 June 2007, Norton went on to be commander of the 38th (Irish) Brigade in Northern Ireland in June 2007, and commander of British troops there in January 2009, before being made Deputy Regional Commander in Helmand Province in early 2010.

Promoted to major general on 8 July 2011, Norton became General Officer Commanding London District and Major-General commanding the Household Division on the same date. He became regimental lieutenant colonel of the Grenadier Guards on 10 June 2012. He was present at the Queen's Diamond Jubilee celebrations in June 2012, and the London Olympics in August 2012.

Norton was appointed a Knight Commander of the Royal Victorian Order on 25 June 2013, following an audience with Queen Elizabeth II. Serving in Northern Italy, he went on to be Deputy Commander NATO Rapid Deployable Corps - Italy in Solbiate Olona in July 2013. He became the UK Military Representative to NATO on 20 May 2016, and to the European Union in July 2016. Norton retired from the British Army on 16 June 2020.

== Later career ==
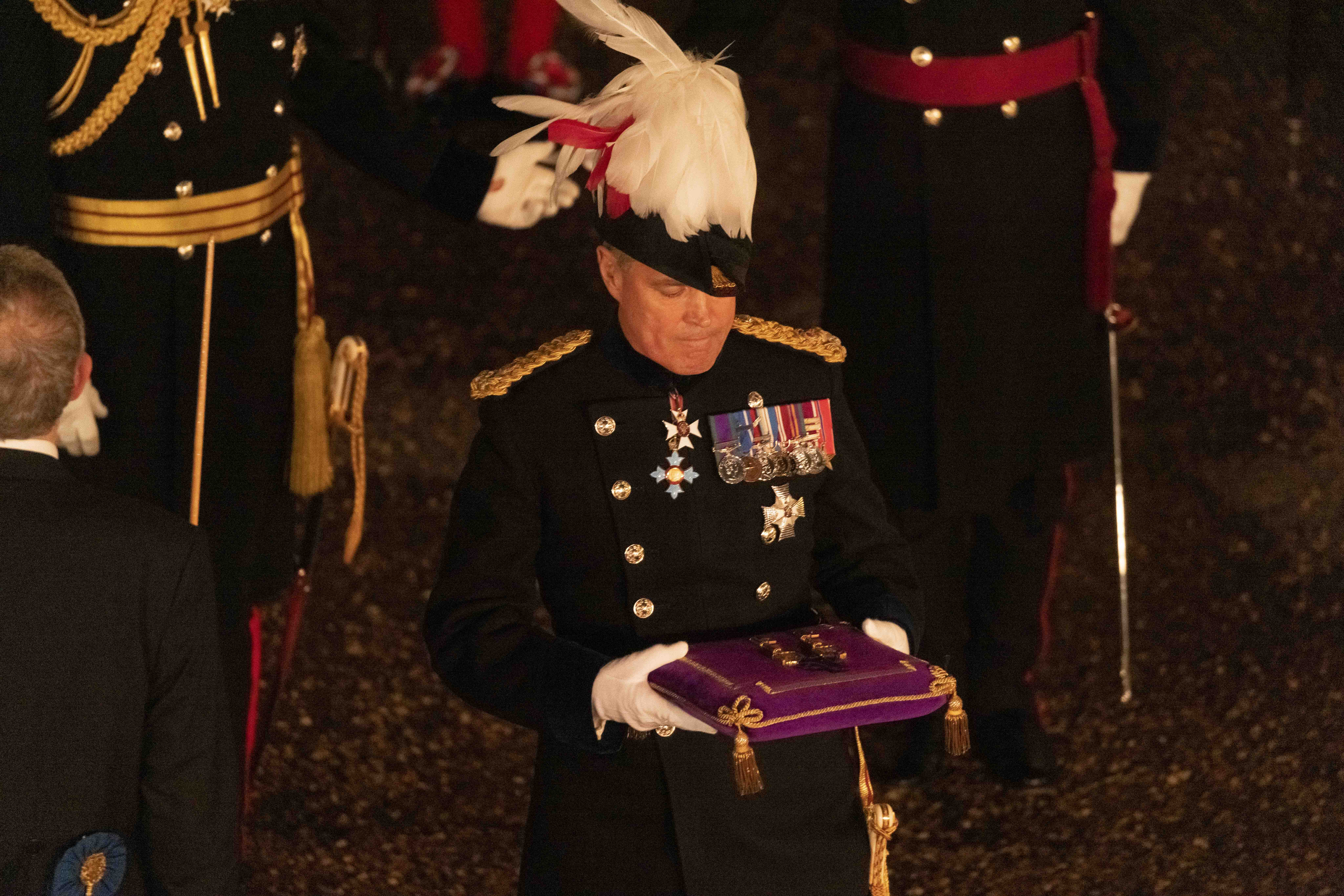
Norton as Lieutenant of the Tower of London in 2022

Norton became Commandant Royal College of Defence Studies on 21 July 2020. On 20 August 2021, he was appointed Lieutenant of the Tower of London.

== Honours and awards ==
Knight Commander of the Royal Victorian Order (KCVO)	2013
Commander of the Order of the British Empire (CBE)	2007
Member of the Order of the British Empire (MBE)	1997
Bronze Star	(United States)
Queen's Commendation for Valuable Service	2011

Military offices
Preceded by Sir William Cubitt	GOC London District; 2011–2013	Succeeded by Edward Smyth-Osbourne
Preceded by Ian Corder	UK Military Representative to NATO; 2016–2020	Succeeded by Sir Ben Bathurst
Preceded by John Kingwell	Commandant of the Royal College of Defence Studies; 2020–present	Incumbent
Honorary titles
Preceded by Sir Simon Mayall	Lieutenant of the Tower of London; 2021–present	Incumbent
