= Robert Freer (RAF officer) =

Royal Air Force Air Chief Marshal (1923-2012)

Sir Robert Freer
- Born: 1 September 1923; Darjeeling, India
- Died: 15 January 2012 (aged 88); Farnham, Surrey, England
- Military career
- Allegiance: United Kingdom
- Branch: Royal Air Force
- Service years: 1942–1982
- Rank: Air Chief Marshal
- Commands: Royal College of Defence Studies (1980–82); No. 18 Group (1975–78); No. 11 Group (1972–75); RAF Seletar (1963–66); No. 92 Squadron (1955–57)
- Conflicts: Second World War; Indonesia–Malaysia confrontation
- Awards: Knight Grand Cross of the Order of the British Empire; Knight Commander of the Order of the Bath; Queen's Commendation for Valuable Service in the Air

Air Chief Marshal Sir Robert William George Freer, GBE, KCB, FRAeS, FRSA (1 September 1923 – 15 January 2012) was a Royal Air Force (RAF) officer who served as Deputy Commander of Strike Command from 1978 to 1979.

== RAF career ==
Educated at Gosport Grammar School, Freer joined the Royal Air Force during the Second World War and became a flying instructor. He was given command of No. 92 Squadron in 1955, and became Station Commander of RAF Seletar in Singapore in 1963 during the Indonesia–Malaysia confrontation. He was made deputy director of Defence Plans in 1966, Deputy Commandant of the RAF Staff College, Bracknell in 1969 and Senior Air Staff Officer at Headquarters Near East Air Force in 1971. He went on to be Air Officer Commanding No. 11 Group in 1972, Air Officer Commanding No. 18 Group in 1975 and Deputy Commander of Strike Command in 1978. His last appointment was as Commandant of the Royal College of Defence Studies in 1980 before he retired in 1982.

In retirement he became a Director of Rediffusion. He died at home on 15 January 2012.

== Family ==
In 1950 he married Margaret Tinkler, daughter of John William Elkington of Ruskington Manor; they had one son and one daughter.

Military offices
Preceded by Sir David Fraser	Commandant of the Royal College of Defence Studies; 1980–1982	Succeeded by Sir William Pillar
Preceded by Sir Alfred Ball	Deputy Commander-in-Chief Strike Command; 1978–1979	Succeeded by Sir Thomas Kennedy
Preceded by Douglas Lowe	Air Officer Commanding No. 18 Group; 1975–1978	Succeeded by Philip Lagesen
Preceded by Ivor Broom	Air Officer Commanding No. 11 Group; 1972–1975	Succeeded by William Harbison
