= Antony Walker =

British Army general (1934–2023)

General Sir Antony Walker KCB
- Born: 16 May 1934; Watford, Hertfordshire, England
- Died: 13 October 2023 (aged 89); Winchester, Hampshire, England
- Military career
- Allegiance: United Kingdom
- Branch: British Army
- Service years: 1954–1992
- Rank: General
- Commands: 3rd Armoured Division; 11th Armoured Brigade; 1st Royal Tank Regiment
- Conflicts: The Troubles
- Awards: Knight Commander of the Order of the Bath; Mentioned in Despatches

General Sir Antony Kenneth Frederick Walker, KCB (16 May 1934 – 13 October 2023) was a British Army officer who served as Commandant of the Royal College of Defence Studies from 1990 to 1992.

== Biography ==
Antony Kenneth Frederick Walker was born in Watford, Hertfordshire on 16 May 1934. Educated at Merchant Taylors' School, Walker attended Royal Military Academy, Sandhurst, and was commissioned into the Royal Tank Regiment in 1954. He served in Northern Ireland during the Troubles and was mentioned in despatches. He was appointed Commanding Officer of 1st Royal Tank Regiment in 1974 and commander of the 11th Armoured Brigade in 1978. He went on to be General Officer Commanding 3rd Armoured Division in 1982, Chief of Staff at Headquarters UK Land Forces in 1985 and Deputy Chief of Defence Staff (Commitments) at the Ministry of Defence in 1987. His last appointment was as Commandant of the Royal College of Defence Studies in 1990 before he retired in 1992.

Walker was appointed Knight Commander of the Order of the Bath (KCB) in the 1987 Birthday Honours.

In retirement Walker was Director-General of the British Institute of Facilities Management 1998–2001, and Communications Director for Aqumen Facilities Management, then a subsidiary of Mowlem. He died from heart failure in Winchester on 13 October 2023, at the age of 89.

Military offices
Preceded by Norman Arthur	General Officer Commanding the 3rd Armoured Division; 1982–1984	Succeeded by David Ramsbotham
Preceded by Sir John Woodward	Deputy Chief of the Defence Staff (Commitments); 1987–1989	Succeeded by Sir Kenneth Hayr
Preceded by Sir Michael Armitage	Commandant of the Royal College of Defence Studies; 1990–1992	Succeeded by Sir John Coward
