= Thomas Egerton Hale =

English Victoria Cross recipient (1832–1909)

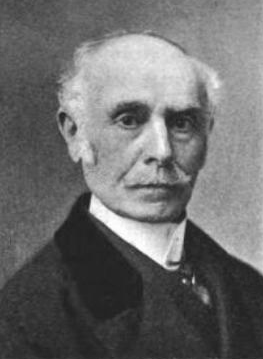
- Born: 24 September 1832; Nantwich, Cheshire, England
- Died: 25 December 1909 (aged 77); Nantwich, Cheshire, England
- Burial place: Acton Parish Churchyard
- Military career
- Allegiance: United Kingdom
- Branch: British Army
- Service years: 1854–1876
- Rank: Lieutenant Colonel
- Units: 7th Regiment of Foot; 43rd Regiment of Foot; 94th Regiment of Foot
- Conflicts: Crimean War; Indian Mutiny
- Awards: Victoria Cross; Order of the Bath

Surgeon Major Thomas Egerton Hale VC CB (24 September 1832 – 25 December 1909) was an English recipient of the Victoria Cross, the highest and most prestigious award for gallantry in the face of the enemy that can be awarded to British and Commonwealth forces.

== Details ==
He was 22 years old, and an assistant surgeon in the 1st Battalion, 7th Regiment of Foot (later The Royal Fusiliers), British Army at Sebastopol in the Crimean War when the following deeds took place for which he was awarded the VC.

First. For remaining with an officer who was dangerously wounded, (Captain H. M. Jones, 7th Regiment), in the fifth parallel, on 8th September, 1855, when all the men in the immediate neighbourhood retreated, excepting Lieutenant W. Hope and Dr. Hale; and for endeavouring to rally the men, in conjunction with Lieutenant W. Hope, 7th Royal Fusiliers. Secondly. For having, on 8th September, 1855, after the regiments had retired into the trenches, cleared the most advanced sap of the wounded, and carried, into the sap, under a heavy fire, several wounded men from the open ground, being assisted by Serjeant Charles Fisher, 7th Royal Fusiliers.

== Further information ==
He later served in the Indian Mutiny and achieved the rank of surgeon major. His Victoria Cross is displayed at the Army Medical Services Museum in Mytchett, Surrey.

He was elected to membership of the Bath and County Club in 1878.
