= Michael Denny =

Royal Navy Admiral (1896–1972)

Admiral Sir Michael Denny GCB CBE DSO
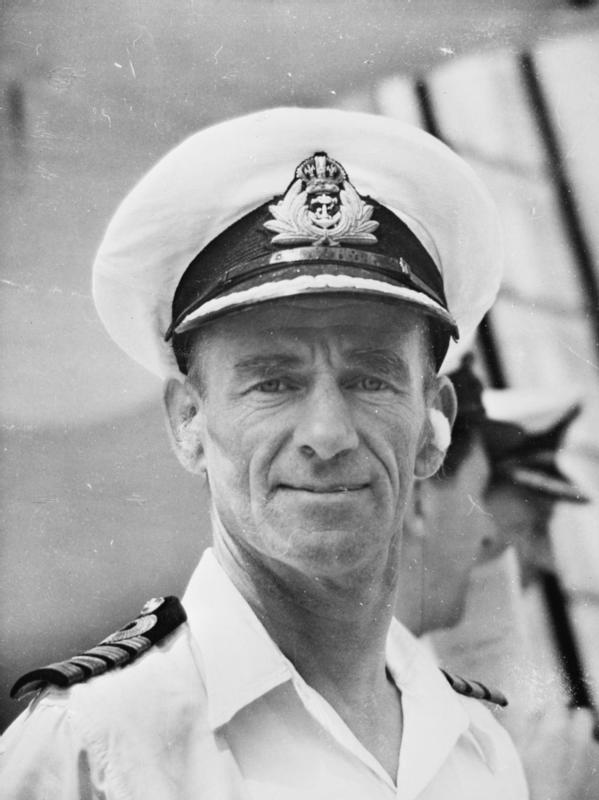
- Denny in March 1945
- Born: 3 October 1896; Kempley, Gloucestershire, England
- Died: 7 April 1972 (aged 75)
- Military career
- Allegiance: United Kingdom
- Branch: Royal Navy
- Service years: 1913–1959
- Rank: Admiral
- Commands: Home Fleet (1954–55); HMS Victorious (1943–45); HMS Kenya (1940–42)
- Conflicts: First World War; Second World War
- Awards: Knight Grand Cross of the Order of the Bath; Commander of the Order of the British Empire; Distinguished Service Order; Mentioned in Despatches; Order of St. Olav (Norway); Order of Ouissam Alaouite (Morocco)

Admiral Sir Michael Maynard Denny, GCB, CBE, DSO (3 October 1896 – 7 April 1972) was a Royal Navy officer who served as Third Sea Lord from 1949 to 1953.

== Naval career ==
Educated at Queen Elizabeth's School, Wimborne Minster, the Royal Naval College, Osborne and the Royal Naval College, Dartmouth, Denny joined the Royal Navy in 1909. He served in the First World War and, after the war, specialised in gunnery. In 1932 he joined the staff of the Commander-in-Chief, Mediterranean Fleet. He spent two years at sea as an executive officer before becoming assistant director of Naval Ordnance at the Admiralty in 1937. He was appointed deputy director of Naval Ordnance in 1938.

Denny served in the Second World War as Senior Naval Officer for the Åndalsnes landing and then as chief staff officer for the Dunkirk evacuation in 1940. In 1940 he was given command of the cruiser HMS Kenya. He became chief of staff to the Commander-in-Chief, Home Fleet in 1942. In 1943 he took command of the aircraft carrier HMS Victorious, from which he conducted air strikes against Okinawa in Japan.

After the war Denny became Assistant Chief of Naval Personnel and Director of Personal Services and then, from 1947, Flag Officer (Destroyers) for the Mediterranean Fleet. In 1949 he became Third Sea Lord and Controller of the Navy and in 1954 he was made Commander-in-Chief, Home Fleet and Commander-in-Chief, Eastern Atlantic. He was appointed Chairman of the British Joint Services Mission to Washington, D.C., and UK Representative on the NATO Standing Group in 1956. He retired in July 1959.

In retirement Denny became a Director of Cammell Laird.

== Family ==
In 1923 Denny married Sara Annie Esme Welman.

Military offices
Preceded by Sir Charles Daniel	Third Sea Lord and Controller of the Navy; 1949–1953	Succeeded by Sir Ralph Edwards
Preceded by Sir George Creasy	Commander in Chief, Home Fleet; 1954–1955	Succeeded by Sir John Eccles
Preceded by Sir John Whiteley	Chief of the British Joint Staff Mission to Washington and UK Military Representative to NATO; 1956–1959	Succeeded by Sir George Mills
