= Henry Bayly (British Army officer, born 1790) =

British Army officer (1790–1867)

Lieutenant-Colonel Sir Henry Bayly KH DL (24 April 1790 – 31 January 1867) was a British Army officer.

Bayly was born in Bath, Somerset, the son of Zachary Bayly of Bideford, Devon and Sarah Bayly née Clutterbuck of Newark Park, where he began his career as a clerk in 1806.

He served in the army at Corunna followed by the Walcheren Campaign and the Peninsular War. He lost an arm at Fuentes de Oñoro, San Sebastián in May 1811. Bayly was first married in 1817 to Mary Jolliffe, then in 1829 to Martha Fisher. His eldest son, Vere Temple Bayly, was also a soldier.

Bayly was Deputy Lieutenant of Dorset and a member of the Bath and County Club.

Bayly died at Lyme Regis in 1867, aged 76.
