= Bath and County Club =

Private members' club in England

The Bath and County Club is a private members' club in Queen's Parade in Bath, Somerset, England. Originally established as a gentlemen's club in 1858, it is open to all, having admitted women as full members since 1996. Membership of the Bath and County Club entitles members to enjoy the full calendar of social events, as well as the reciprocal benefits of many other clubs in London, around the UK and the rest of the world.

Non-members can hire the Club for special events.

== History ==
The club was founded on 14 April 1858, in the style of established London gentlemen's clubs such as White's and Boodles. Other members' clubs in Bath had included the York Club at the York House Hotel, established in 1790, and the New Club at 5 Edgar Buildings, established in 1832. By 1861, both had merged fully into the new Bath and County Club.

In September 1858, the Bath and County Club opened its doors at new premises, with 165 members. A large house at 21 Queen Square, Bath, was leased from the Rivers Estate as its headquarters and furnished using the fittings from the defunct York Club. Its membership was drawn from the many retired and serving military officers living in and around Bath, as well as professionals, politicians including Members of Parliament, and landed gentry.

In the 1870s the club acquired an additional lease on 22 Queen Square next door, as well as the entire block of buildings behind and to the west and north, facing Queen's Parade and Queen's Parade Place, including a property called Victoria House.

Throughout the 19th and early 20th centuries, the Bath and County Club was famous for its lavish annual balls. Usually held in April at the end of the traditional Bath season, they were hosted in the Upper Rooms, now called the Bath Assembly Rooms.

=== Post-war years ===
Following the Second World War, the club struggled financially. In 1953, the club became a luncheon club, rather than residential. In 1978, the members agreed to sell its extensive 18th century properties overlooking Queen Square, and use the funds to renovate the club's remaining premises facing Queen's Parade. Following the renovations in 1981, the club now had a modern bar, library, billiards room and dining room with extensive kitchens. These are the premises that the Club occupies today.

=== Membership ===
Membership is open to all on an annual fee basis or a short term trial. Benefits include the use of the Club's comfortable facilities in the centre of Bath where lunch is provided, as well as the opportunity to join the Club's many social and evening events, formal and informal lunches and dinners. Membership of the Bath & County Club also grants reciprocal membership to a wide range of prestigious Clubs in London, the rest of the UK and around the world.

The Club opened its doors to women members in 1953. Although allowed to dine with men, they were not allowed to drink with them until 1979, and the Club retained a gentlemen-only bar. Gwen Jones became the Club's first female bartender and its first female Secretary, years before the Club voted to extend full membership to women in October 1996.

== Notable former members (list in development) ==
- Air Chief Marshal Sir Michael Armitage (RAF officer)
- Air Chief Marshal Sir John Barraclough (RAF officer)
- Lt Col Sir Henry Bayly (British Army officer, born 1790)
- John Bethell, inventor
- Nathaniel Bousfield, MP
- Charles Boyle, 10th Earl of Cork
- Richard Bright (politician), MP
- Rear Admiral John Bythesea, holder of the Victoria Cross
- Wilfred Cairns, 4th Earl Cairns
- Admiral Sir George Callaghan
- Colonel Aylmer Cameron, holder of the Victoria Cross
- Gavin Campbell, 1st Marquess of Breadalbane
- Ulick Considine, cricketer and rugby union player
- Vice Admiral Norwich Duff
- Surgeon Major Thomas Egerton Hale, holder of the Victoria Cross
- Reggie Ingle, cricketer
- Ponsonby Moore, 9th Earl of Drogheda
- Field Marshall Earl Frederick Roberts, 1st Earl Roberts
- General Sir Frank Simpson (British Army officer)
- Sir Campbell Stuart
- Viscount Weymouth, Thomas Thynne, 5th Marquess of Bath
- William Waldegrave, 9th Earl Waldegrave
- Lt Col Sir Francis Younghusband
