= John Coward (Royal Navy officer) =

Royal Navy admiral (1937–2020)

Vice Admiral Sir John Coward KCB DSO
- Born: 11 October 1937
- Died: 30 May 2020 (aged 82)
- Military career
- Allegiance: United Kingdom
- Branch: Royal Navy
- Service years: 1958–1994
- Rank: Vice Admiral
- Commands: Royal College of Defence Studies; Flag Officer Sea Training; Flag Officer, First Flotilla; Flag Officer Submarines; HMS Brilliant
- Conflicts: Falklands War
- Awards: Knight Commander of the Order of the Bath; Distinguished Service Order

Vice Admiral Sir John Francis Coward, KCB, DSO (11 October 1937 – 30 May 2020) was a Royal Navy officer who served as Commandant of the Royal College of Defence Studies from 1992 to 1994.

== Naval career ==
Coward joined the Royal Navy in 1958. He served in the Falklands War in 1982 as Captain of HMS Brilliant. He was appointed Flag Officer Sea Training in 1987, Flag Officer, First Flotilla in 1988, and Flag Officer Submarines and Commander of the Eastern Atlantic Submarine Area in 1989. He became Commandant of the Royal College of Defence Studies in 1992 and retired in 1994.

In retirement Coward served as Lieutenant Governor of Guernsey from 1994 to 2000.

He died on 30 May 2020 at the age of 82.

Military offices
Preceded by Barry Wilson	Flag Officer Sea Training; 1987–1988	Succeeded by Roy Newman
Preceded by Frank Grenier	Flag Officer Submarines; 1989–1991	Post disbanded
Preceded by Sir Antony Walker	Commandant of the Royal College of Defence Studies; 1992–1994	Succeeded by Sir Timothy Garden
Government offices
Preceded by Sir Michael Wilkins	Lieutenant Governor of Guernsey; 1994–2000	Succeeded by Sir John Foley
