= Charles Daniel (Royal Navy officer) =

British Royal Navy officer (1894–1981)

Admiral Sir Charles Daniel KCB CBE DSO
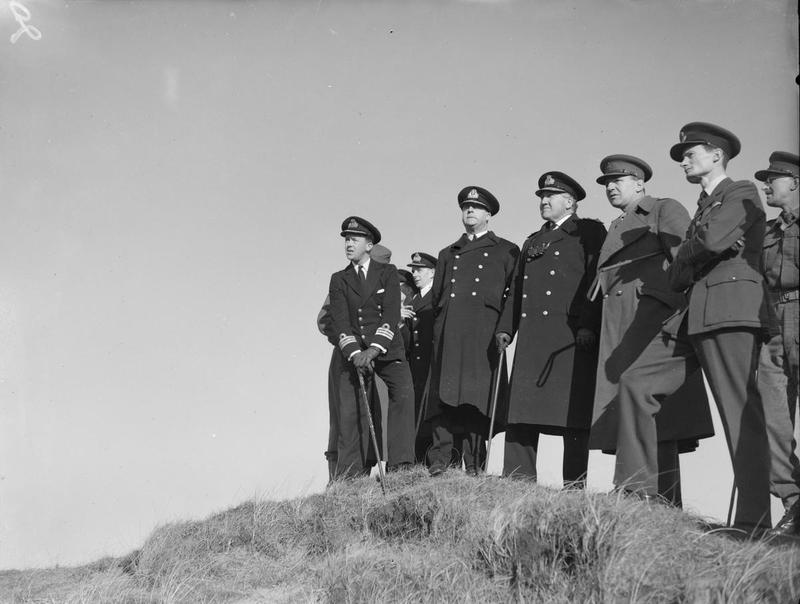
- Daniel inspecting a combined operations exercise in 1943
- Born: 23 June 1894
- Died: 11 February 1981 (aged 86)
- Military career
- Allegiance: United Kingdom
- Branch: Royal Navy
- Service years: 1907–1952
- Rank: Admiral
- Commands: Imperial Defence College (1949–51); HMS Renown (1941–43); 8th Destroyer Flotilla (1938–40); HMS Faulknor (1938–40)
- Conflicts: First World War; Second World War
- Awards: Knight Commander of the Order of the Bath; Commander of the Order of the British Empire; Distinguished Service Order; Mentioned in Despatches

Admiral Sir Charles Saumarez Daniel, KCB, CBE, DSO (23 June 1894 – 11 February 1981) was a Royal Navy officer who went on to be Third Sea Lord and Controller of the Navy.

== Naval career ==
Educated at Southcliffe School in Filey, the Royal Naval College, Osborne, and the Royal Naval College, Dartmouth, Daniel was commissioned into the Royal Navy in 1912. He served in the First World War taking part in the Battle of Jutland in 1916. He was made Experimental Commander at HM Signal School in 1928 and executive officer of HMS Glorious in 1933 before becoming a member of staff for the Joint Planning Committee at the Admiralty in 1936.

He served in the Second World War initially as Captain (Destroyers) for the 8th Destroyer Flotilla and then, from 1940, as Director of Plans at the Admiralty. He went on to be Captain of HMS Renown in 1941, Flag Officer, Combined Operations in 1943 and Vice Admiral in charge of Administration for the British Pacific Fleet in 1944. After the war, he became Third Sea Lord and Controller of the Navy and then, from 1949, Commandant of the Imperial Defence College before retiring in 1952.

In retirement he became Chairman of the Television Advisory Committee.

== Family ==
In 1919, he married Marjory Katharine Wilson; they had one daughter. Following the death of his first wife, he married Beatrice Pendlebury Worsley, widow of his brother-in-law John Pares Wilson, in 1963.

Military offices
Preceded by Sir Frederic Wake-Walker	Third Sea Lord and Controller of the Navy; 1945–1949	Succeeded by Sir Michael Denny
Preceded by Sir John Slessor	Commandant of the Imperial Defence College; 1949–1952	Succeeded by Sir Frank Simpson
