= John Slessor =

Marshal of the Royal Air Force (1897-1979)

Marshal of the Royal Air Force Sir John Slessor GCB DSO MC
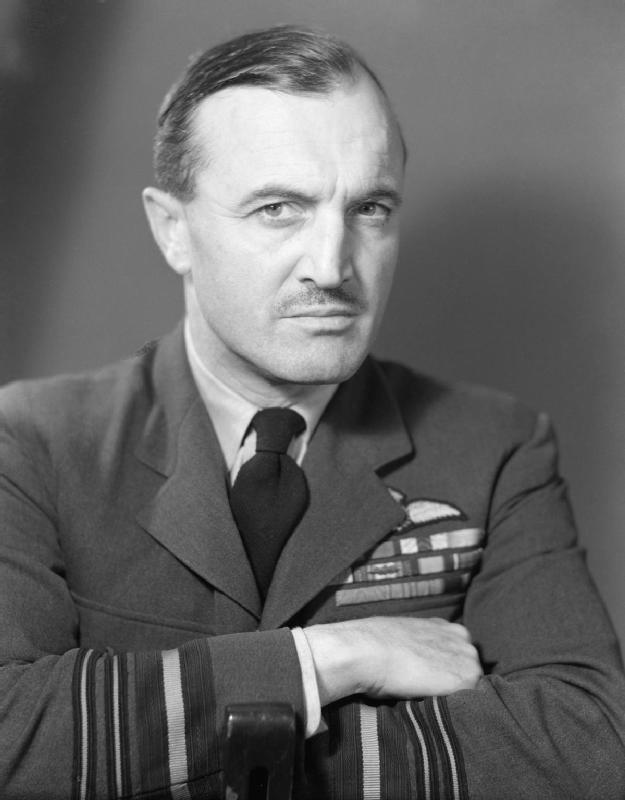
- Air Marshal Sir John Slessor, 1943
- Born: 3 June 1897; Ranikhet, India
- Died: 12 July 1979 (aged 82); Wroughton, England
- Military career
- Allegiance: United Kingdom
- Branch: Royal Flying Corps (1915–18); Royal Air Force (1918–52)
- Service years: 1915–1952
- Rank: Marshal of the Royal Air Force
- Units: No. 17 Squadron (1915–16); No. 5 Squadron (1917–18)
- Commands: Chief of the Air Staff (1950–52); Commandant of the Imperial Defence College (1948–49); Air Member for Personnel (1945–47); Coastal Command (1943–44); No. 5 Group (1941–42); No. 3 (Indian) Wing (1935–37); No. 4 Squadron (1925–28)
- Conflicts: First World War; Waziristan campaign Second World War
- Awards: Knight Grand Cross of the Order of the Bath; Companion of the Distinguished Service Order; Military Cross; Mentioned in Despatches (3)
- Other work: Author; Sheriff of Somerset (1965)

Marshal of the Royal Air Force Sir John Cotesworth Slessor, GCB, DSO, MC (3 June 1897 – 12 July 1979) was a senior commander in the Royal Air Force (RAF), serving as Chief of the Air Staff from 1950 to 1952. As a pilot in the Royal Flying Corps during the First World War, he saw action with No. 17 Squadron in the Middle East, earning the Military Cross, and with No. 5 Squadron on the Western Front, where he was awarded the Belgian Croix de Guerre. Between the wars he commanded No. 4 Squadron in England, and No. 3 (Indian) Wing, and was appointed a Companion of the Distinguished Service Order for operations with the latter in Waziristan. In 1936, he published Air Power and Armies, which examined the use of air power against targets on and behind the battlefield.

Slessor held several operational commands in the Second World War. As Air Officer Commanding Coastal Command in 1943 and 1944, he was credited with doing much to turn the tide of the Battle of the Atlantic through his use of long-range bombers against German U-boats. He was knighted in June 1943. In the closing stages of the war he became Commander-in-Chief RAF Mediterranean and Middle East and deputy to Lieutenant General Ira Eaker as Commander-in-Chief Mediterranean Allied Air Forces, conducting operations in the Italian Campaign and Yugoslavia. Slessor went on to serve in the RAF's most senior post, Chief of the Air Staff, in the early 1950s, and was considered a strong proponent of strategic bombing and the nuclear deterrent. In retirement he published two more books, including an autobiography, and held ceremonial appointments in Somerset.

== Early life and First World War ==
The son of Major Arthur Kerr Slessor and Adelaide Slessor (née Cotesworth), Slessor was born in Ranikhet, India, on 3 June 1897, and educated at Haileybury. Lame in both legs as a result of polio, he was rejected for army service in 1914 and received a commission as a second lieutenant in the Royal Flying Corps on 6 July 1915 only with the help of family connections. He was appointed to the Special Reserve as a flying officer on 9 September 1915, and confirmed in his rank of second lieutenant on 28 September. Slessor saw action with No. 17 Squadron in Egypt and the Sudan, where he was credited with arresting the escape of Sultan Ali Dinar and 2,000 men on 23 May 1916, following the Sultan's defeat at Beringia. He was mentioned in despatches on 25 October before being wounded in the thigh and invalided back to England.

Slessor was promoted to the temporary rank of captain on 1 December 1916. Awarded the Military Cross on 1 January 1917, he returned to combat in April as a flight commander with No. 5 Squadron on the Western Front. The squadron converted from Royal Aircraft Factory BE.2s to R.E.8s soon afterwards. Promoted to the substantive rank of lieutenant on 1 July 1917, Slessor was appointed a Chevalier of the Belgian Order of Leopold on 24 September, and awarded the Belgian Croix de Guerre on 11 March 1918. He transferred to the newly formed Royal Air Force in April 1918 and, having been promoted to the temporary rank of major on 3 July 1918, was posted to the Central Flying School at Upavon as an instructor on 14 July 1918.

== Inter-war years ==
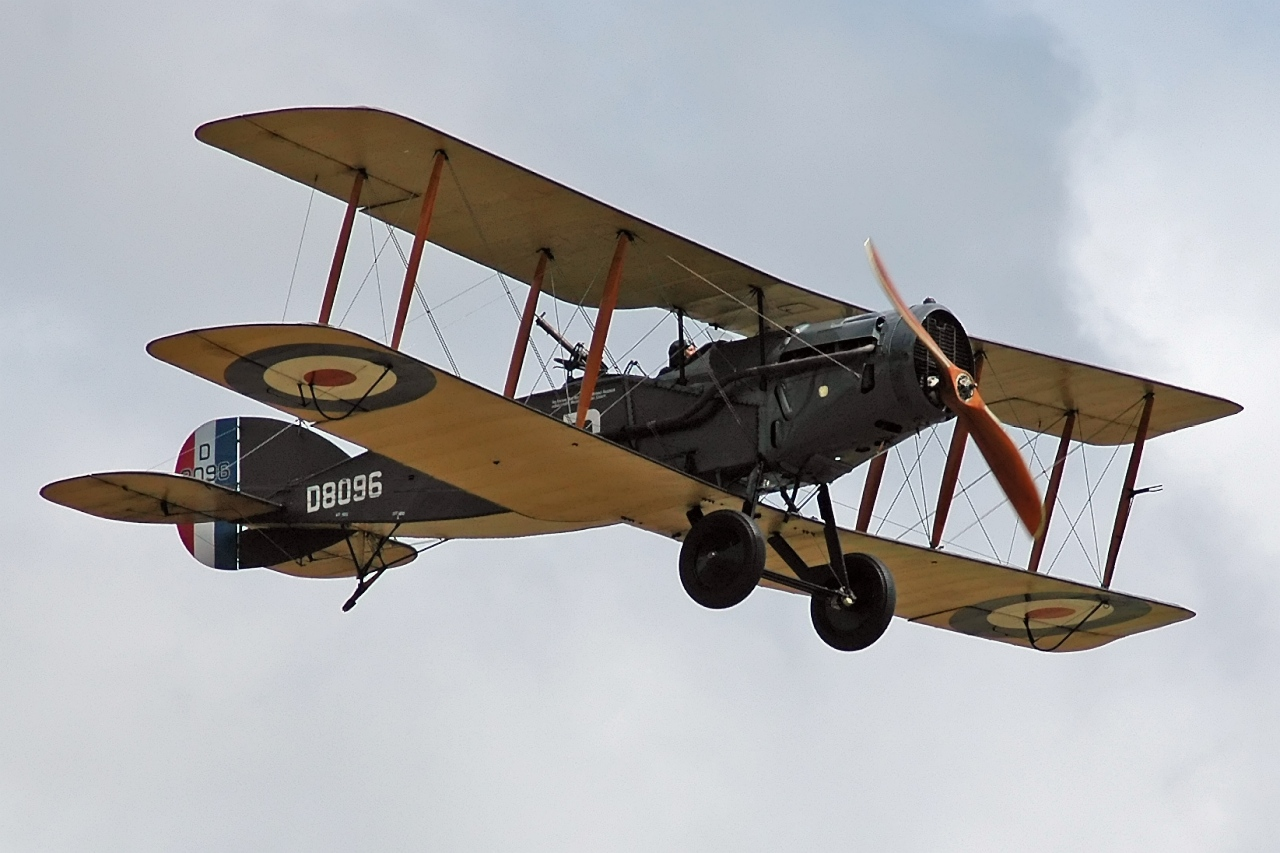
Bristol Fighter, a type flown by Slessor in the 1920s

Having left the RAF as a flight lieutenant on 21 August 1919, Slessor applied to rejoin and was offered a short-service commission at the same rank on 24 February 1920. In May 1921, he became a flight commander with No. 20 Squadron, which operated Bristol Fighters on the North-West Frontier of India. He joined the staff at the Directorate of Training and Staff Duties in the Air Ministry in February 1923. The same year, he married Hermione Grace Guinness; they had a son and a daughter. He attended the RAF Staff College, Andover, in 1924, and was promoted squadron leader on 1 January 1925.

Slessor commanded No. 4 (Army Cooperation) Squadron, which flew Bristol Fighters out of RAF Farnborough, from April 1925 to October 1928, when he joined the air planning staff at the Directorate of Operations and Intelligence at the Air Ministry. He attended the Staff College, Camberley, in 1931, and was appointed RAF Directing Staff Officer there in January 1932. Slessor was promoted acting wing commander on 1 January 1932 (substantive on 1 July). He became Officer Commanding No. 3 (Indian) Wing at Quetta in March 1935, and was appointed a Companion of the Distinguished Service Order for operations in Waziristan between 25 November 1936 and 16 January 1937.

In 1936, Slessor published Air Power and Armies, an examination of the use of air power against targets on and behind the battlefield. In this work he advocated army co-operation, interdiction to cut off enemy reinforcements and supply, and the use of aerial bombardment as a weapon against enemy morale. He did, however, acknowledge the limitations of his theory, stating:

...the conditions envisaged throughout [this book] are those of a campaign on the land in which the primary problem at the time is the defeat of an enemy army in the field. ... in a war against a great Naval power at sea, or when the principle threat to the Empire at the time is the action of hostile air forces against this country or its possessions, the aim and objectives of the air forces of the Empire will not be the same as described in this book.

On 17 May 1937, following his posting to India, Slessor was promoted acting group captain, and appointed deputy director of Plans at the Air Ministry. He was promoted to substantive group captain on 1 July 1937. Mentioned in despatches on 18 February 1938, he took over as Director of Plans on 22 December 1938. He was appointed Air Aide-de-Camp to the King on 1 January 1939.

== Second World War ==
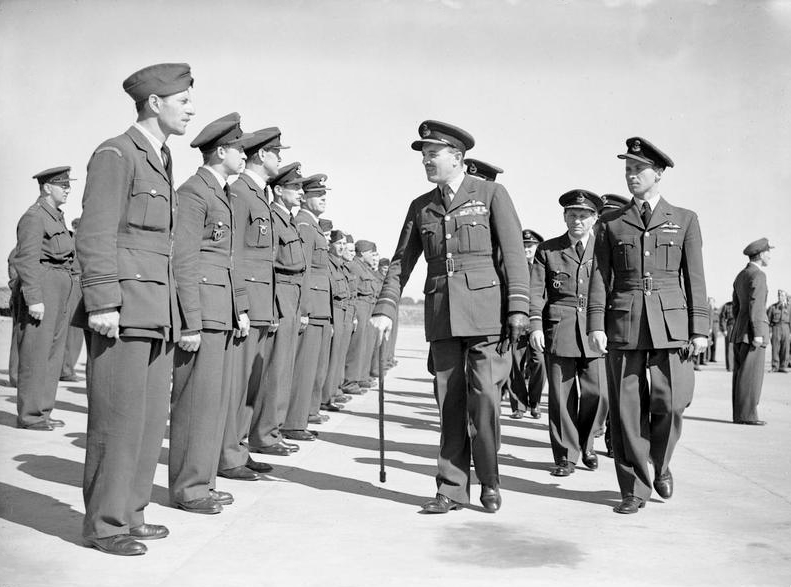
Air Marshal Slessor as Air Member for Personnel, inspecting Czecho-Slovak personnel during the farewell parade of Czech squadrons at Manston, Kent, in 1945

Slessor was promoted air commodore on 1 September 1939, and was succeeded as Air Aide-de-Camp by Group Captain Ralph Cochrane. On 10 January 1941, he was raised to temporary air vice marshal (made permanent in April 1942) and became Air Officer Commanding (AOC) No.5 (Bomber) Group in May 1941. Appointed a Companion of the Order of the Bath and mentioned in dispatches in January 1942, he was appointed Assistant Chief of the Air Staff in April 1942.

Slessor was closely involved in planning the combined Allied air offensive in Europe. At the Casablanca Conference in January 1943, he was able to influence Britain's Secretary for Air, Sir Archibald Sinclair, and Chief of the Air Staff, Air Chief Marshal Sir Charles Portal, to agree to USAAF proposals that led to a "round-the clock" bombing policy against Germany, with the US mounting daylight precision attacks and the RAF conducting area bombing at night. Slessor's assigned personal pilot was Flight Lieutenant Owen Phillipps DFC, an Australian from No. 14 Squadron RAF and a distinguished veteran of the Mediterranean conflict.

Appointed Commander-in-Chief Coastal Command with the acting rank of air marshal on 5 February 1943, Slessor had at his disposal sixty squadrons, two of which were equipped with B-24 Liberator heavy bombers. He was credited with doing much to turn the tide of the Battle of the Atlantic in the Allies' favour by employing his thinly stretched long-range bomber force against the U-boat threat, in close cooperation with naval forces. Promoted temporary air marshal on 1 June 1943, he was advanced to Knight Commander of the Order of the Bath in the 1943 Birthday Honours. Slessor became Commander-in-Chief RAF Mediterranean and Middle East in January 1944, and deputy to Lieutenant General Ira Eaker as Commander-in-Chief Mediterranean Allied Air Forces. In this role he conducted operations in the Italian Campaign and Yugoslavia, establishing the Balkan Air Force in the latter theatre. Slessor joined the Air Council as Air Member for Personnel on 5 April 1945. His rank of air marshal became substantive on 6 June. He was awarded the Grand Cross of the Greek Order of the Phoenix on 6 September 1946. His war service also earned him appointment as a Commander of the Belgian Order of Leopold on 27 August 1948, and a Knight Grand Cross of the Norwegian Order of St. Olav on 6 March 1953.

== Post-war career ==
Slessor was promoted air chief marshal on 1 January 1946. He continued to serve as Air Member for Personnel, responsible for overseeing the demobilisation of the wartime RAF, until 1 October 1947. At the urging of the-then Chief of the Air Staff, Marshal of the Royal Air Force Sir Arthur Tedder, Slessor succeeded General Sir William Slim as Commandant of the Imperial Defence College. Slessor had been dubious about accepting the position, and sought assurances from Tedder that he would be next in line for the post of Chief of the Air Staff, particularly in light of Tedder's preference for Air Chief Marshal Sir Ralph Cochrane to succeed him. Meanwhile, Slessor was appointed a Knight Grand Cross of the Order of the Bath on 10 June 1948, and became Principal Air Aide-de-Camp to the King on 1 July. In the event, he took over from Tedder as Chief of the Air Staff on 1 January 1950, and chose Cochrane as his Vice Chief of the Air Staff. Slessor was promoted Marshal of the Royal Air Force on 8 June 1950. In late 1951, he reluctantly became involved in the Australian Government's quest for a suitable RAF officer to serve as Chief of the Air Staff of the Royal Australian Air Force. He eventually selected Air Marshal Donald Hardman as the "outstanding candidate" for the Australian post, trying to avoid what he called "the follies of some years ago", referring to Air Chief Marshal Sir Charles Burnett's controversial tenure as Chief of the Air Staff in Australia on secondment from Britain in the early years of the Second World War.

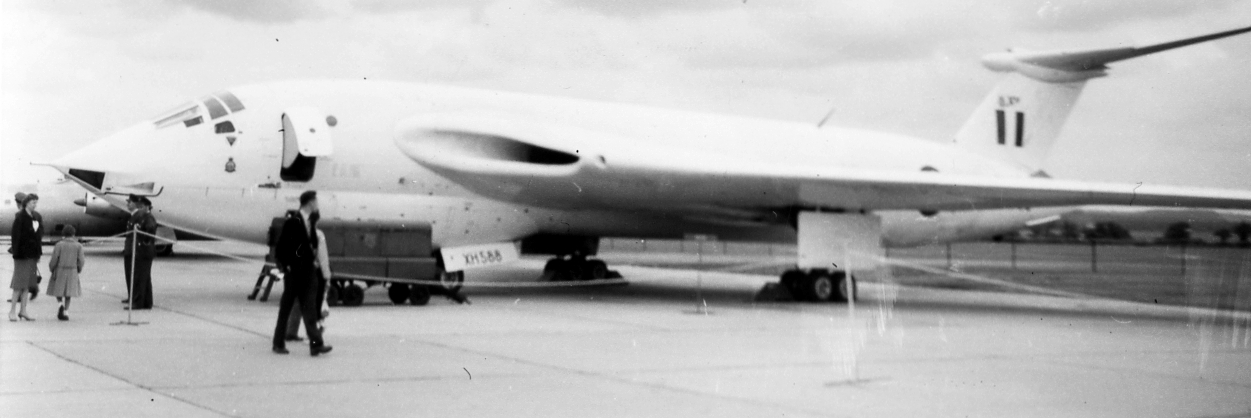
Victor bomber pictured in 1959

As leader of the RAF, Slessor coined the term "V-Force" to denote its planned trio of strategic jet bombers—the Vickers Valiant, Handley Page Victor, and Avro Vulcan—and contributed to the decision to build all three designs. He played a key role in promoting nuclear weapons as an effective instrument of deterrence in early Cold War British strategy. In 1952, the RAF argued that, because bombers were such an important deterrent, conventional forces could be drastically reduced at a time when the Government was seeking significant public expenditure savings. Slessor believed it unlikely that the United Kingdom would be able to meet a communist offensive without resorting to the use of tactical nuclear weapons. He became one of the key propagandists of the "Great Deterrent" (which he employed as the title of a book he wrote after he retired) on both sides of the Atlantic. Slessor's term as Chief of the Air Staff was dominated by the Korean War.

== Later life ==
Completing his term as Chief of the Air Staff on 31 December 1952, Slessor was succeeded by Air Chief Marshal Sir William Dickson and retired from the RAF on 29 January 1953. He attended the coronation of Queen Elizabeth II in June 1953. In retirement he published two books: his autobiography, The Central Blue (1956), and The Great Deterrent (1957). He served as Honorary Air Commodore of No. 3 (County of Devon) Maritime Headquarters Unit, Royal Auxiliary Air Force, from 23 May 1963 to 5 May 1969. His wife, Lady Hermione, was appointed a Serving Sister of the Most Venerable Order of the Hospital of St. John of Jerusalem on 2 July 1963.

On 24 March 1965, Slessor was appointed Sheriff of Somerset for the following year. He was commissioned a Deputy Lieutenant of Somerset in April 1969. Slessor was also a director of Blackburn Aircraft and governor of several schools. After Hermione's death, he married Marcella Florence Priest (née Spurgeon) in 1971. Slessor died at the Princess Alexandra Hospital, Wroughton, in Wiltshire on 12 July 1979. His son John also joined the RAF, rising to the rank of group captain.

== Notes ==
Military offices
Preceded by Norman Bottomley	Air Officer Commanding No. 5 Group; 1941–1942	Succeeded by Alec Coryton
Preceded by Sir Philip Joubert de la Ferté	Commander-in-Chief Coastal Command; 1943–1944	Succeeded by Sir William Sholto Douglas
New title	Commander-in-Chief RAF Mediterranean and Middle East; 1944–1945	Succeeded by Sir Guy Garrod
Preceded by Sir Bertine Sutton	Air Member for Personnel; 1945–1947	Succeeded by Sir Hugh Saunders
Preceded by Sir William Slim	Commandant of the Imperial Defence College; 1948–1949	Succeeded by Sir Charles Daniel
Preceded by Sir Arthur Tedder	Chief of the Air Staff; 1950–1952	Succeeded by Sir William Dickson
Honorary titles
Preceded by Richard Hill	High Sheriff of Somerset; 1965–1966	Succeeded by Sir Edward Malet
