= Susan Garden, Baroness Garden of Frognal =

British politician (born 1944)

The Right Honourable The Baroness Garden of Frognal PC
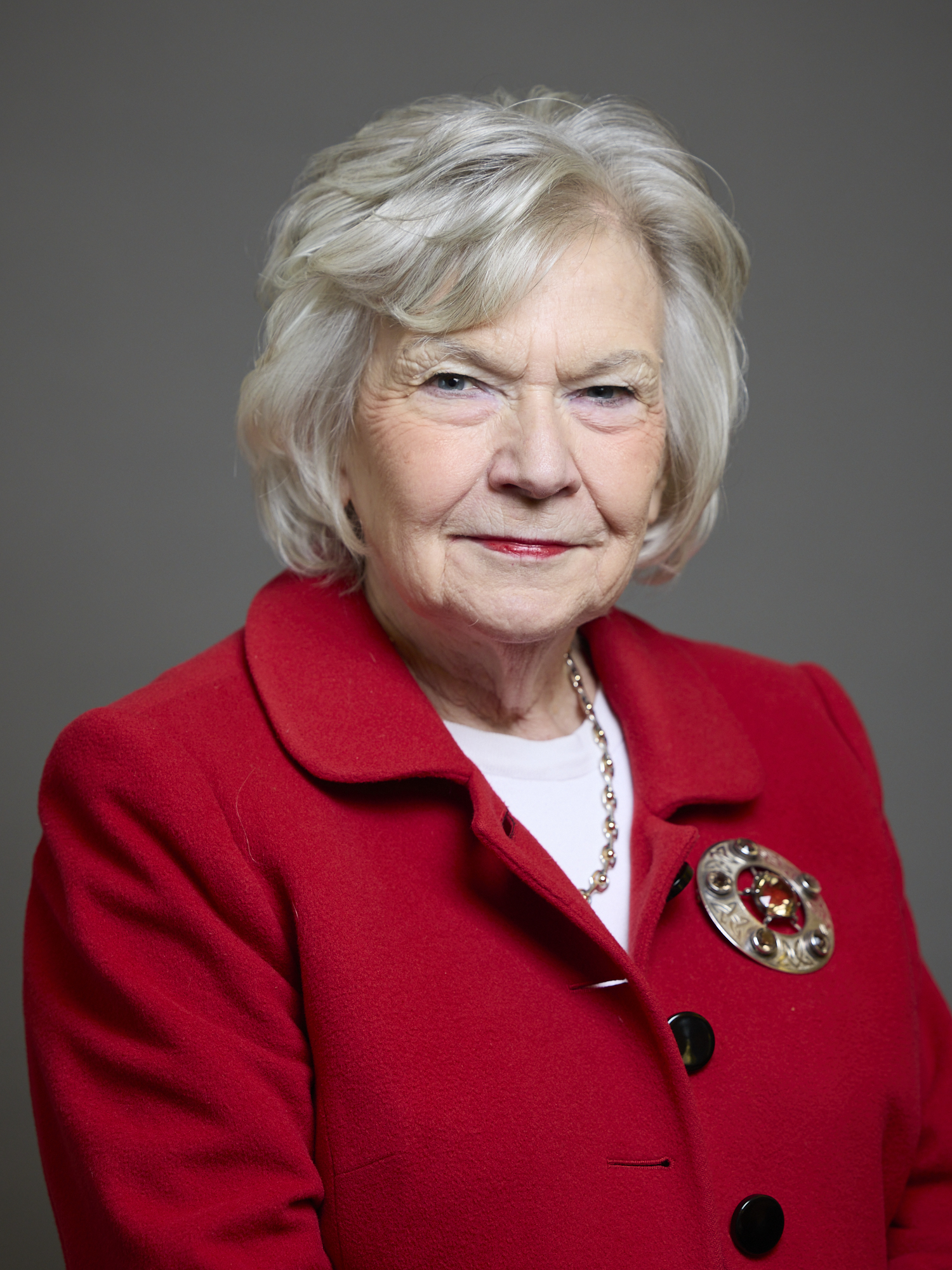
- Official portrait, 2024

Deputy Speaker of the House of Lords
- Incumbent
- Assumed office 5 March 2018

Baroness-in-Waiting Government Whip
- In office 4 November 2014 – 7 May 2015
- Prime Minister: David Cameron
- Preceded by: The Lord Ahmad of Wimbledon
- Succeeded by: Vacant
- In office 13 October 2010 – 7 October 2013
- Prime Minister: David Cameron
- Preceded by: The Baroness Thornton
- Succeeded by: The Baroness Jolly

Member of the House of Lords
- Lord Temporal
- Life peerage 16 October 2007

Personal details
- Born: 22 February 1944 (age 82)
- Party: Liberal Democrats
- Spouse: Timothy Garden (m. 1965; died 2007)
- Children: Antonia Rolph and Alexandra Whitfield
- Education: St Hilda's College, Oxford

Susan "Sue" Elizabeth Garden, Baroness Garden of Frognal PC (born Button, 22 February 1944) is a British Liberal Democrat politician who, since 2018, serves as a Deputy Speaker in the House of Lords. Garden ran in the 2016 election to replace Baroness D'Souza as Lord Speaker, one of the two primary offices of the UK Parliament; Garden came second (of three candidates running) in that election to Lord Fowler.

== Career ==
Educated at Westonbirt School and St Hilda's College, Oxford she became a teacher, becoming Hon FCIL in 2012.

Lady Garden stood as the Liberal Democrat parliamentary candidate for Finchley and Golders Green (London) in 2005. In September 2007 she was created a Life Peer as Baroness Garden of Frognal, of Hampstead in the London Borough of Camden.

Lady Garden is a former Government Whip and Spokesperson for the Department for Digital, Culture, Media and Sport, for the Department for Business, Innovation and Skills and (on higher education) for the Department for Education.

== Personal life ==
Garden married Timothy Garden in 1965, and they had two daughters. Lord Garden died on 9 August 2007.

== Styles ==
- Mrs Timothy Garden (1965–1994)
- Lady Garden (1994–2004)
- The Rt Hon. The Lady Garden (2004–2007)
- The Rt Hon. The Baroness Garden of Frognal (2007–2015)
- The Rt Hon. The Baroness Garden of Frognal, PC (2015–)
