= British Armed Forces Federation =

- BAFF Logo
- Formation: 2006
- Type: Staff association
- Headquarters: Wiltshire, United Kingdom
- Website: baff.org.uk

The British Armed Forces Federation (BAFF) is an independent non-statutory professional staff association for members of the British Armed Forces. It is politically non-partisan. Founded in late 2006 as a not-for-profit company limited by guarantee, BAFF has so far no full-time staff and no formal regional network. It operates collaboratively, using the Internet as the primary means of communication amongst its members worldwide. Membership is open to anyone who is serving or has served in the Royal Navy/Royal Marines, British Army, or Royal Air Force, irrespective of rank or type of engagement (Regular or Reserves).

== Status and governance ==
As it exists primarily for the benefit of the members of a profession, BAFF is not a registered charity. The Steering Group which took BAFF to formation stated that the Federation would "not seek to supplant the role of any existing charity or other agency involved in service welfare".

Neither is BAFF a trade union. The Steering Group seemed at pains to stress that the organisation would not be a trade union. In any case, although regular service personnel are permitted by King's Regulations to join civilian trade unions or professional associations in order to enhance their trade skills and professional knowledge and as an aid to resettlement, armed forces personnel are specifically excluded from the definition of "workers" for the purposes of British trade union legislation. A body set up to represent such personnel cannot, therefore, register as a trade union under the Trade Union and Labour Relations (Consolidation) Act 1992.

BAFF is registered with the Information Commissioner as a data controller, under its Company name BAFF (2006) Ltd and the operating name "British Armed Forces Federation". BAFF is regulated by the UK Ministry of Justice in respect of regulated claims management activities.

BAFF is managed by an elected Executive Council of 15 members.

== Services and campaigns ==
According to statements on the BAFF website, the current offering of services to members of the Federation includes:

- An independent voice, including media relations, parliamentary lobbying and representations to Central and Local Government. The Federation campaigns on issues such as:
  - improvements to single living accommodation
  - improvements to service family accommodation
  - armed forces compensation scheme limits
  - medical care for forces personnel and families
  - medical care for veterans
  - social housing entitlements for ex-service personnel and families
- A free legal advice helpline which does not, however, cover "employment-related matters".
- A free personal accident claim line.
- A restricted members-only internet forum, which BAFF regards as a key means of consultation and the identification of collective issues.

== Organisational models ==
According to statements on its website, the BAFF Constitution was drawn up in consultation with some fifty serving personnel from all three branches of HM Forces. A "specifically British solution for the British armed forces", BAFF claims not to be modelled on any other single organisation, but that its Steering Group took into account (and in certain cases, visited) a wide range of organisations representing operational public service staff, including:

- Representative military organisations in Australia. The Armed Forces Federation of Australia Inc was founded in 1984 and ceased operations at the end of 2006, but the Defence Force Welfare Association (founded 1959) and Defence Reserves Association (founded 1969) continue to represent Australian personnel and are recognized by the Chain of Command of the Australian Defence Force.
- Association of the United States Army.
- Permanent Defence Force Other Ranks Representative Association. (Ireland).
- Police Federation of England and Wales, Defence Police Federation, and other UK Police Federations.
- GCG section of the Public and Commercial Services Union, which represents GCHQ staff.

Military staff associations may be configured to represent

- Specific rank ranges within the military hierarchy;
- Specific sections of the armed forces - Navy, Army, Air Force, or (where applicable) Gendarmerie; or
- Specific categories of personnel - regulars, reservists, conscripts (where applicable) or retirees.

In accordance with the principle "All of one company", BAFF recruits from all such categories, but with a reduced subscription for junior serving personnel.

== English language examples of military staff association ==
Dates of establishment are shown in brackets.

Australia

- Defence Force Welfare Association (1959)
- Defence Reserves Association (1969)

Ireland

- Permanent Defence Force Other Ranks Representative Association (1991)
- Representative Association of Commissioned Officers (1991)
- Reserve Defence Force Representative Association (1991)

United States

- Association of the United States Army (1950)
- Army Reserve Association (1993)
- Military Officers Association of America (1929)
- Non Commissioned Officers Association (1960)
- Reserve Officers Association (1922)

== International contacts ==
BAFF liaises with EUROMIL, the European Organisation of Military Associations, but is not formally affiliated to that organisation. BAFF also has informal bilateral contacts with a number of EUROMIL-affiliated associations. As a member of a EUROMIL observer delegation, a BAFF representative has been participating in a Council of Europe working group on Human Rights of Members of the Armed Forces.

== Criticisms and controversies ==
In the course of evidence to a House of Commons Committee in February 2006 the Chief of Defence Staff of the time, General Sir Michael Walker (now Lord Walker of Aldringham) argued that

If we had a set of Armed Services that reacted to every whim of every influential group in it, we would get nowhere in delivering military capability for this country, so I believe that the chain of command must do that business. The Armed Forces Pay Review Body does look after the conditions and pay concerns and we would certainly lose the AFPRB and I am not sure we would get as much attention from the Government in terms of rewarding people.

Walker went on to give the example of an unspecified national contingent which, while he was in command in Bosnia, had (he told the Committee)

laid down its arms because, it said, the pay deal was not right, so they put their arms down. Do you really see British Armed Services doing that? That is the sort of trouble you get into when there is a representative body who are fighting back at home, your soldiers are at the front and they do not appear to be achieving.

Speaking in an Armed Forces debate in the House of Lords in June 2006, Field Marshal Lord Inge acknowledged a "growing demand for a military federation or union", but went on to pose the rhetorical question "whether those [armed forces] who have federations and unions have ever won".

A report published in November 2007 by the British think tank Demos commented that

Perhaps the most distinctive development over the last decade has been the launch of the British Armed Forces Federation (BAFF) as an independent campaigning professional association for serving and retired service personnel ... The response of senior commanders to the creation of BAFF and their criticism set out for the House of Commons Select Committee has been mixed. While some senior commanders have argued that any independent organisation designed to 'fight for the rights' of British troops is completely unnecessary and threatens a dangerous breakdown of military discipline, others, such as the late Lord Garden, a former RAF Air Marshal ..., have been "surprised talking to retired senior military people who are prepared to think about it, saying there might be a case for it".
