= Commandant Royal College of Defence Studies =

Head of the Royal College of Defence Studies in Britain

Commandant, Royal College of Defence Studies
- Car flag of the Commandant, Royal College of Defence Studies

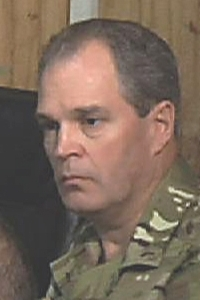
- Incumbent; George Norton since 2020
- Precursor: Commandant, Imperial Defence College
- First holder: Mervyn Butler

The Commandant of the Royal College of Defence Studies, formerly the Commandant of the Imperial Defence College, is the head of the Royal College of Defence Studies, a British military staff college which instructs senior officers, diplomats, and civil servants.

The Commandant was a senior serving military officer between 1972 and 2001: the post rotated through the three branches of the armed forces in turn. In 1971, the old Imperial Defence College became the Royal College of Defence Studies. In 1991, the post was downgraded to three-star, and then in 2001, it was opened up to competition through public advertisement. Subsequent incumbents were all senior retired military officers, until the appointment of a diplomat in 2014. In 2019, a civil service job advert stated the post would be at SCS2 pay grade, or Two-star rank or NATO OF-7 rank.

== List of Commandants ==
Commandants have included:

Commandant of the Imperial Defence College

- Vice-Admiral Sir Herbert Richmond KCB (1926)
- Major-General William Bartholomew GCB CMG DSO (1929)
- Air Marshal Sir Robert Brooke-Popham GCVO KCB CMG DSO AFC (1931)
- Vice-Admiral Sir Lionel Preston KCB (1933)
- Major-General Robert Haining CB DSO (1935)
- Air Marshal Sir Arthur Longmore KCB DSO (1936)
- Vice-Admiral Hugh Binney CB DSO (1939)

Note: The post was vacant during World War II

- General Sir William Slim GBE KCB DSO, MC (1946)
- Air Chief Marshal Sir John Slessor KCB DSO MC (1948)
- Admiral Sir Charles Daniel KCB CBE DSO (1949)
- General Sir Frank Simpson GBE KCB DSO (1952)
- Air Chief Marshal Sir Arthur Sanders GCB KBE (1954)
- Admiral The Hon Sir Guy Russell GBE KCB DSO (1956)
- General Sir Geoffrey Bourne KCB KBE CMG (1958)
- Sir Robert Scott GCMG CBE (1960)
- Air Chief Marshal Sir Hugh Constantine KBE CB DSO (1961)
- Admiral Sir Deric Holland-Martin GCB DSO DSC (1964)
- General Sir John Anderson GBE KCB DSO (1966)
- Air Chief Marshal Sir Donald Evans KBE CB DFC (1968)
- The Hon Alastair Buchan CBE (1970)

Commandant of the Royal College of Defence Studies

- General Sir Mervyn Butler KCB CBE DSO MC (1972)
- General Sir Antony Read GCB CBE DSO MC ADC (Gen) (1973)
- Air Chief Marshal Sir John Barraclough KCB CBE DFC AFC (1974)
- Admiral Sir Ian Easton KCB DSC (1976)
- General Sir David Fraser KCB OBE ADC (Gen) (1978)
- Air Chief Marshal Sir Robert Freer GBE KCB (1980)
- Admiral Sir William Pillar GBE KCB (1982)
- General Sir Michael Gow GCB, ADC (Gen) (1984)
- Admiral Sir David Hallifax KCB KBE (1986)
- Air Chief Marshal Sir Michael Armitage KCB CBE (1988)
- General Sir Antony Walker KCB (1990)
- Vice Admiral Sir John Coward KCB DSO (1992)
- Air Marshal Lord Garden KCB (1994)
- Lieutenant General Sir Scott Grant CB (1996)
- Vice Admiral John McAnally CB LVO (1998)
- Lieutenant General Sir Christopher Wallace KBE (2001)
- Admiral Sir Ian Garnett KCB (2005)
- Vice Admiral Charles Style CBE (2008)
- Lieutenant General Sir David Bill KCB (2012)
- Sir Tom Phillips KCMG (2014)
- Sir Simon Gass KCMG CVO (2018)
- Rear Admiral John Kingwell CBE (2019)
- Lieutenant General Sir George Norton KCVO CBE (2020)
