= Royal College of Defence Studies =

British military training institute

- Former name: Imperial Defence College (1927–1970)
- Type: Senior military college
- Established: 1927; 99 years ago
- Parent institution: Defence Academy of the United Kingdom
- Commandant: Lieutenant General Sir George Norton
- Location: Seaford House, 37 Belgrave Square, London, UK; 51°29′57″N 0°9′5″W
- Campus: Urban
- Website: Official website

The Royal College of Defence Studies (RCDS) is an institute of higher education that instructs the most promising senior officers of the British Armed Forces, His Majesty's Diplomatic Service and Civil Service in national defence and international security matters at the highest level, to prepare them for the top posts in their respective services. It forms part of the Defence Academy of the United Kingdom, and is its most senior and prestigious component. In addition, there are many overseas attendees from countries who are close allies of the United Kingdom.

The college is based in London. It was known as the Imperial Defence College from its foundation in 1927 until 1970.

== History ==
Following discussion in the Committee of Imperial Defence in June 1920, a cabinet committee under Winston Churchill, then Secretary of State for the Colonies, met in March 1922 and recommended the formation of the College as "the beginnings of a common brain for the three Services". The college was founded in 1927 as the Imperial Defence College and was located at 9 Buckingham Gate until 1939. Its objective at that time was to instruct senior military officers in the defence of the British Empire, "to look at the problem of war as whole and not merely from a land, or sea, or air point of view." In 1946, following the end of World War II, the college reopened at Seaford House, Belgrave Square and members of the United States Armed Forces started attending the course for the first time.

In 1970, the IDC was renamed the Royal College of Defence Studies and several royal visits followed. The Queen and Prince Philip visited the college in 2007 to mark its 80th anniversary.

== RCDS course ==
The RCDS mission is:

"To prepare senior officers and officials of the United Kingdom and other countries, and future leaders from the private and public sectors, for high responsibilities in their respective organisations, by developing their analytical powers, knowledge of defence and international security, and strategic vision."

RCDS forms a part of the Defence Academy of the United Kingdom. In fulfilment of its mission, the college runs one course a year, from September to July. As of 2024, each course is attended by approximately 110 full-time members. Attendees are military officers of Colonel/Brigadier or equivalent rank, and also include Home Office and Ministry of Defence civil servants, Foreign Office diplomats, police officers and a few representatives from the private sector. All members would have been selected to attend the course on the strength of their potential to progress to high positions within their professions.

The course composition has been progressively widened to include members from nearly 50 overseas countries per year, who are invited by the Ministry of Defence through diplomatic channels. Graduates of the college are entitled to the post-nominal letters rcds, while prior to 1970 the post-nominal letters idc were used.

Since 2001, course members have had the option of studying in a joint programme that leads to an MA in International Security and Strategy from King's College London.

== Commandants ==
The College is led by the Commandant, currently Lieutenant General Sir George Norton. The Commandant leads the Senior Directing Staff of the College, who are in effect the faculty and are a mixture of active and retired military officers, diplomats and civil servants.
