= 195th (Airlanding) Field Ambulance =

195th (Airlanding) Field Ambualance
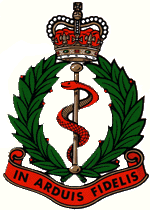
- Cap badge of the Royal Army Medical Corps
- Active: 1943–1948
- Country: United Kingdom
- Branch: British Army
- Type: Medical
- Role: Airborne forces
- Size: Field Ambulance
- Part of: 6th Airlanding Brigade
- Engagements: Normandy landings Rhine crossing

Insignia
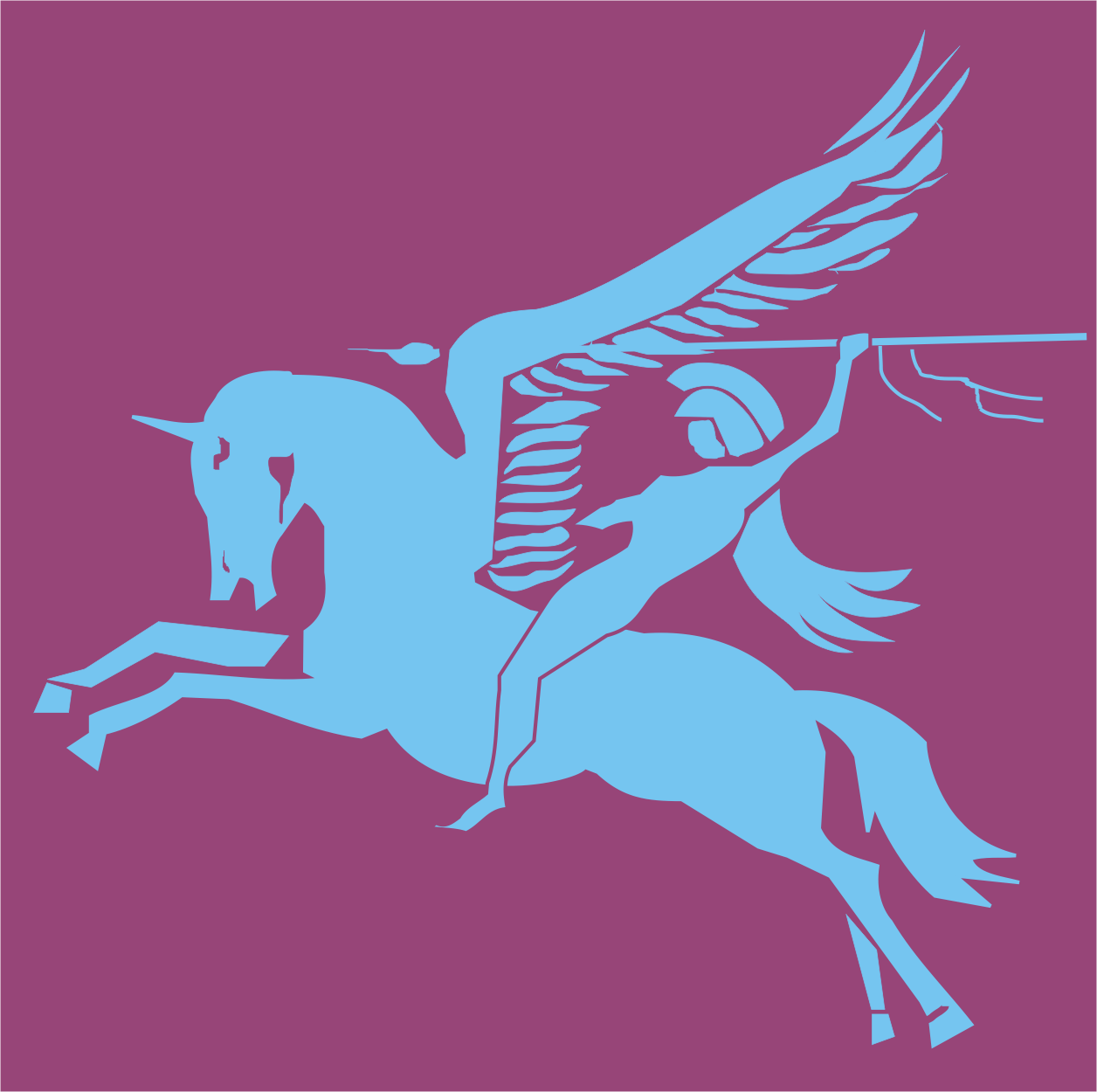
- Emblem of the British Airborne Forces

The 195th (Airlanding) Field Ambulance was a Royal Army Medical Corps unit of the British airborne forces during the Second World War.

The 195th was the second airlanding Field Ambulance formed by the British Army. Once raised it was assigned to the 6th Airlanding Brigade, which was part of the 6th Airborne Division. It accompanied the brigade on operations, seeing service in the Normandy landings in 1944, and the River Rhine crossing in 1945, after which they remained in Germany following the advance until the end of the war.

At the end of May 1945, the 195th was withdrawn back to England, but by the end of the year had moved with the 6th Airborne Division to the British mandate of Palestine in an internal security role. The 195th served in Palestine until the 6th Airlanding Brigade was disbanded.

== Background ==
Impressed by the success of German airborne operations, during the Battle of France, the British Prime Minister, Winston Churchill, directed the War Office to investigate the possibility of creating a corps of 5,000 parachute troops. In September 1941 the 1st Parachute Brigade began forming, comprising three parachute infantry battalions. In keeping with British Army practice at the same time as the infantry battalions were forming, airborne supporting arms were formed including Royal Army Medical Corps volunteers. Of the seven airborne field ambulances formed during the Second World War, two were glider borne the 181st and the 195th. While the other five were parachute trained the 16th, 127th, 133rd, 224th and the 225th.

== 195th (Airlanding) Field Ambulance ==
On 1 October 1943, the 195th (Airlanding) Field Ambulance was formed under the command of Lieutenant-Colonel Maurice Anderson, by the conversion of the 195th Field Ambulance to parachute duties. The 195th was the second airlanding field ambulance unit formed. It was then assigned to the 6th Airlanding Brigade, part of the 6th Airborne Division. Training for the 195th as an airborne force was arduous, and designed to ensure they were at the peak of physical fitness. It also comprised glider training, accustoming them to the hardships and problems associated with travelling by gliders. To complement their glider training, some of the unit also completed parachute training.

The war establishment of an airlanding field ambulance consisted of 204 all ranks, consisting of ten doctors in two surgical teams and five sections. They could deal with 330 cases in twenty-four hours, with the surgical teams completing 1.8 operations an hour, but if they were required to operate the following day had to be relieved after twelve hours.

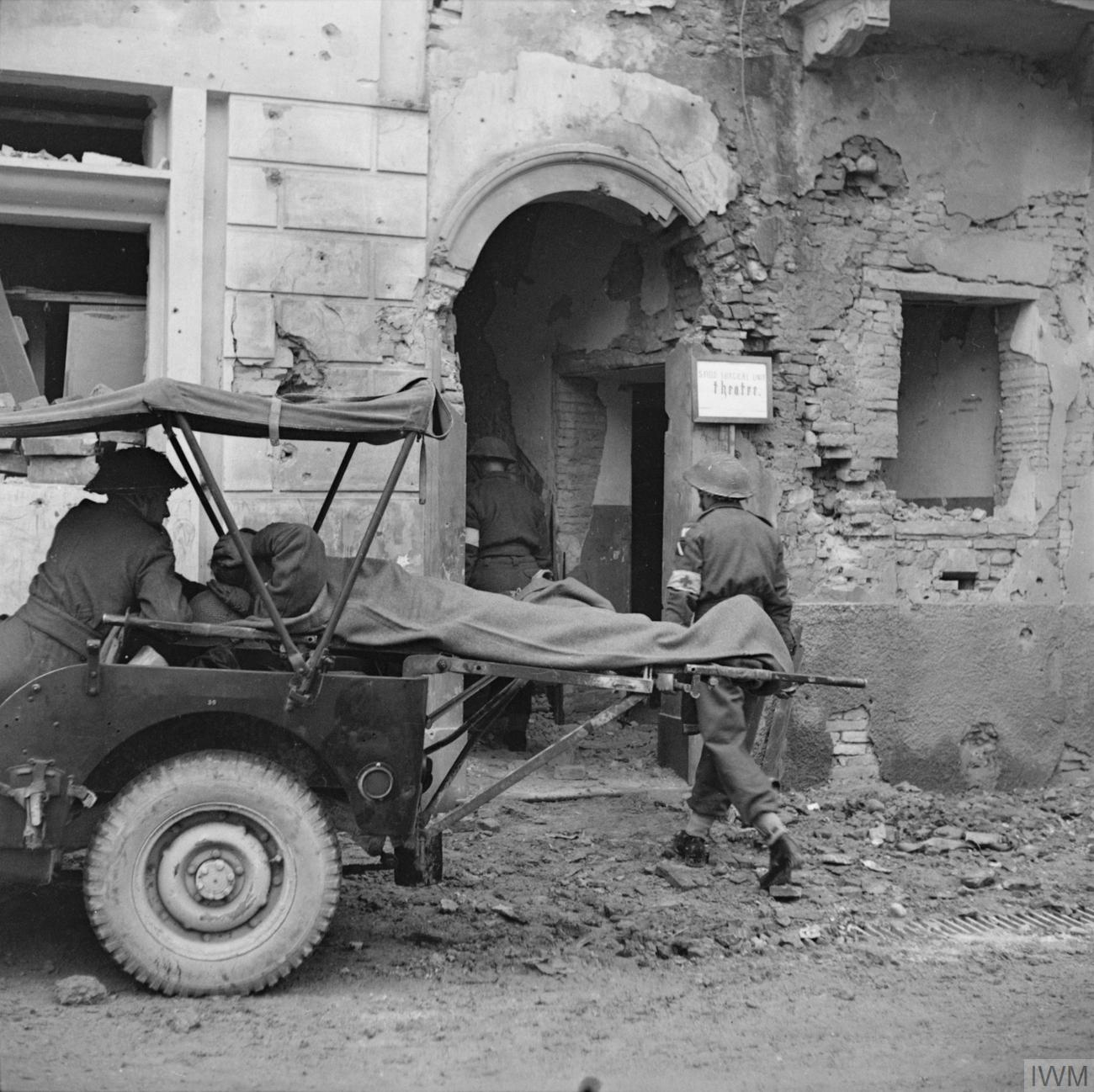
Medical Jeep with stretchers fixed to the rear

It was commanded by a Lieutenant-Colonel, with a major second in command and a regimental sergeant major as the senior non-commissioned rank. Medical staff included two specialist surgeons and a specialist anaesthetist, a pharmacist and a Royal Army Dental Corps (RADC) dentist. To assist with operations there were six operating room assistants, a sergeant nursing orderly and six nursing orderlies. Other medical staff included a sergeant sanitary assistant, a masseur, and a RADC orderly. These were assisted by five stretcher bearers, one of whom was trained as a shoemaker. The rest of the headquarters comprised a quartermaster, clerks, cooks, storemen, an Army Physical Training Corps instructor and a barber. The four sections each comprised an officer (doctor) in command and a staff sergeant (nursing orderly) second in command as well as three nursing orderlies, a clerk, a dutyman and thirteen stretcher bearers. The last component of the Field Ambulance was the Royal Army Service Corps detachment, commanded by a captain, with a company sergeant major as second in command. They had fifty men under them, including thirty-eight drivers, four motorcyclists and five vehicle mechanics.

== Operations ==
=== Normandy ===
The 6th Airborne Divisions two parachute brigades landed in Normandy in the early hours of 6 June 1944, in Operation Tonga. The 195th would land from around 21:00 that evening in Operation Mallard, the plan for the unit was flexible and the location they would establish their Main Dressing Station (MDS) would be decided after they had landed. To carry the 195th to Normandy they were assigned ten Horsa gliders; on board there were the MDS staff, with the two surgical teams and Nos. 3 and 4 Sections. At total there were eleven officers, 109 other ranks, nine Jeeps and five trailers. The remainder of the unit would arrive by sea.

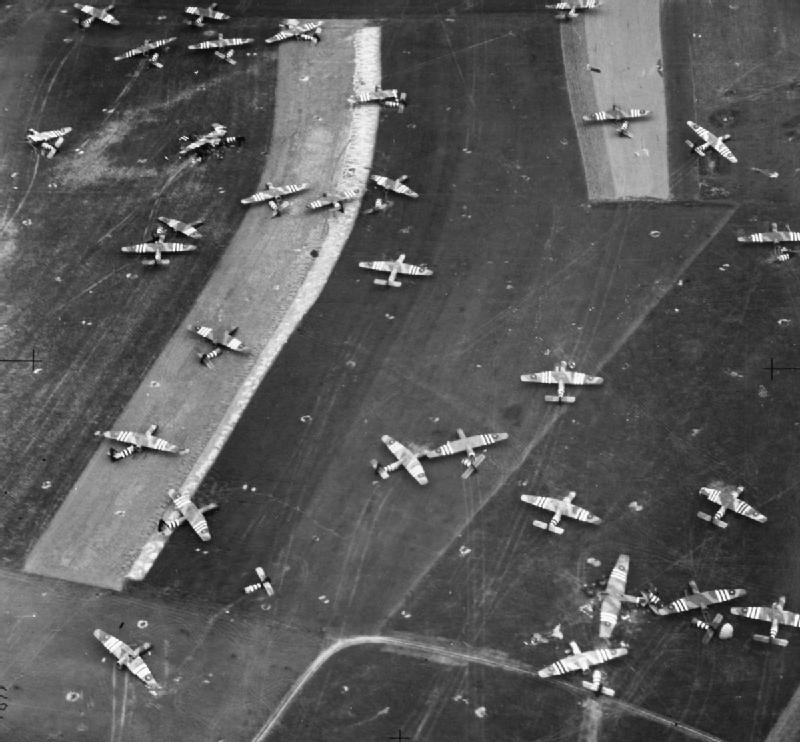
Gliders on landing zone 'N', 7 June 1944

The commanding officer with No. 3 Section would land at landing zone 'N', while the MDS with No. 4 Section landed at landing zone 'W'. By 22:30 they had cleared the landing zone and stayed the night at Bas de Ranville and the following morning set up the MDS at Mariquet, which was receiving casualties by 11:00. By midnight 7 June they had treated 154 wounded and the surgeons had performed twenty-three operations. By 07:00 8 June a secure route to the landing beaches was formed and the wounded were evacuated to England. Later that afternoon the seaborne party arrived, reinforcing the MDS staff. In the evening the MDS, which had been under mortar fire, received a direct hit and one of the surgical teams was moved into the buildings basement. Throughout the day they treated 163 wounded and performed eleven operations. On 9 June the MDS was still under intermittent mortar fire but managed to treat 156 wounded and perform eleven operations. By now a blood bank had been established for the British forces at Le Deliverande but supplies were still short and volunteers were asked to donate blood. One volunteer was a captured German non-commissioned officer medical orderly, who not only gave blood but assisted at the MDS. For his conduct during this time the second in command Major Young wrote out a citation for the Iron Cross, which was passed to the German authorities. From 18 June an exhaustion ward was set up at the MDS; men identified as suffering were sedated for forty-eight hours and then returned to their units. By the end of June the 195th had admitted 1,687 men to the MDS and performed 127 operations.

On 19 August the 6th Airborne Division crossed the River Dives and advanced north along the coast of France. In the advance No. 2 Section was attached to the 2nd Ox and Bucks Light Infantry, while No. 3 Section was attached to the 12th Devonshire Regiment and later the 1st Royal Ulster Rifles. The MDS at first remained where it was and casualties were evacuated from the front line back to the MDS by Jeep. The following day it was moved across the River Dives to the Château de Villers, and on 26 August to the Manor de la Pommeraye. The division was withdrawn to England in September 1944; during the advance, the 195th had treated 332 casualties, performing nineteen operations.

=== Germany ===
In England the 195th were refitted and reformed then in December sent back to Europe in response to the surprise German offensive in the Ardennes, arriving at Calais on 24 December. The division remained on the continent carrying out patrols until February when once again they were withdrawn to England.

The second airborne crossing of the River Rhine, Operation Varsity took place on 24 March 1945. Involved were the British 6th and the American 17th Airborne Division. With the 6th Division landing in the area around Bergen and Hamminkeln. As in Normandy the two parachute brigades would land first followed by the airlanding brigade.

The gliders carrying the 195th started crossing the River Rhine from 10:30; in the face of prepared German defences the airlanding brigade suffered forty per cent casualties in the landings. The following afternoon the troops involved in the assault river crossing the 15th (Scottish) Infantry Division linked up with the airborne troops, who by then had taken almost 3,000 casualties.

On 26 March the 195th followed up the divisions advance into Germany, passing through Rhade, Limbeck and reached Coesfeld on 30 March. Reaching the River Weser the 195th established their MDS at Petershagen, they did not remain here long with the speed of the divisions advance, they were soon at the River Elbe. At Wismar the 195th set up a refugee reception centre, and started treating German civilians and refugees fleeing west from the advancing Russians. Here they remained until the end of the war.

=== Palestine ===
At the end of May the division was withdrawn to England, it had been intended for them to go to the Far East for operations against the Japanese Empire. The dropping of the atomic bombs changed the War Office plans and instead the division was sent to Palestine as the Imperial Strategic reserve. On their arrival in Palestine the 6th Airlanding Brigade was concentrated in the Gaza area while they acclimatised to the conditions.

When the division deployed at the end of October the 195th moved to the Samaria district. On 15 April 1946, 6th Airlanding Brigade left the division and was renumbered the 31st Independent Infantry Brigade. However the 195th remained with the 6th Airborne Division, and retained as a parachute unit being renamed the 195th (Parachute) Field Ambulance. On 31 October the 195th suffered its first casualties, when two men were killed by a mine exploding under their vehicle. In January 1947 the division relocated to the north of Palestine and the 195th moved to the Galilee sector. In 1948 the British mandate in Palestine ended. At the same time it was decided to disband the division and all its units. Leaving in small groups the last men of the 195th left Palestine in March 1948.
