= 6th Airlanding Brigade =

British Army WWII airborne infantry brigade

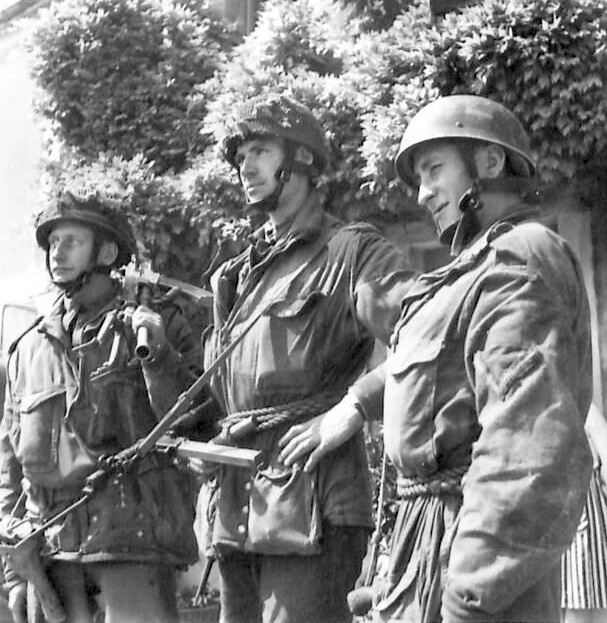
- Men of the 2nd Battalion, Oxfordshire and Buckinghamshire Light Infantry, part of the 6th Airlanding Brigade, in Normandy, June 1944.
- Active: 1943–1946
- Country: United Kingdom
- Branch: British Army
- Type: Glider infantry
- Role: Airborne forces (Note: The British Army's airborne forces consisted of parachute and glider-borne troops.)
- Size: Brigade, 3,500 men
- Part of: 6th Airborne Division
- Nickname: Red Devils (Note: The 1st Parachute Brigade had been called the "Rote Teufel" or "Red Devils" by the German troops they had fought in North Africa. The title was officially confirmed by General Sir Harold Alexander and henceforth applied to all British airborne troops.)
- Engagements: Invasion of Normandy; Operation Mallard; Battle of the Bulge; Operation Varsity; Palestine

Commanders
- Notable commanders: Hugh Kindersley

Insignia
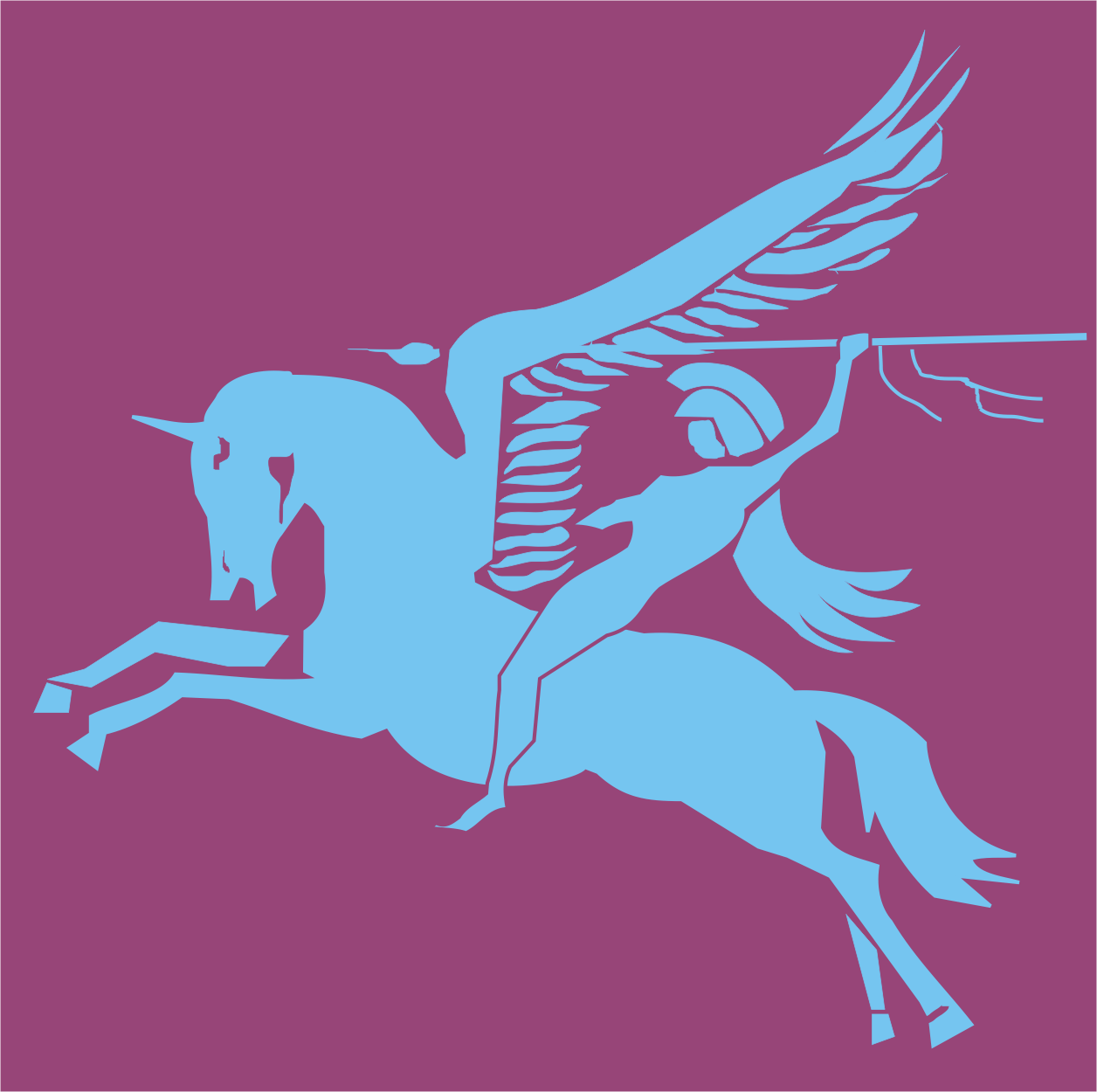
- Emblem of the British airborne forces

The 6th Airlanding Brigade was an airborne infantry brigade of the British Army during the Second World War. Created during May 1943, the brigade was composed of three glider infantry battalions and supporting units, and was assigned to the 6th Airborne Division, alongside the 3rd and 5th Parachute Brigades.

During the Normandy landings of 6 June 1944, the brigade took part in Operation Mallard, holding the southern flank of the Normandy bridgehead over the River Orne. In August 1944, during the final stages of the Battle of Normandy, along with the rest of the 6th Airborne Division, the brigade took part in the advance to the River Seine. Withdrawn to England in September, the brigade, with the rest of the division, returned to mainland Europe in December to counter the German Army's surprise offensive in the Ardennes, better known as the Battle of the Bulge. Their final airborne mission of the war was Operation Varsity in March 1945, an airborne assault crossing of the Rhine, after which they advanced through Germany, reaching the Baltic Sea at Wismar by the end of the war.

The brigade was withdrawn from Germany at the end of May 1945 and was sent to Palestine with the rest of the division to provide internal security. Following the arrival of the 1st Parachute Brigade, however, the 6th Airlanding Brigade was no longer needed there and was returned to normal infantry duties, and renamed the 31st Independent Infantry Brigade.

== Background ==
Impressed by the success of German airborne operations during the Battle of France, the British Prime Minister, Winston Churchill, directed the War Office to investigate the possibility of creating a force of 5,000 parachute troops. As a result, on 22 June 1940, No. 2 Commando assumed parachute duties, and on 21 November was re-designated the 11th Special Air Service Battalion, with a parachute and glider wing. This later became the 1st Parachute Battalion.

On 21 June 1940 the Central Landing Establishment was formed at Ringway airfield near Manchester. Although tasked primarily with training parachute troops, it was also directed to investigate the use of gliders to transport troops into battle. At the same time, the Ministry of Aircraft Production contracted General Aircraft Limited to design and produce a glider for this purpose. The result was the General Aircraft Hotspur, an aircraft capable of transporting eight soldiers, that was used for both assault and training purposes.

The success of the first British airborne raid, Operation Colossus, prompted the War Office to expand the airborne force through the creation of the Parachute Regiment, and to develop plans to convert several infantry battalions into parachute and glider infantry battalions. On 31 May 1941, a joint Army and RAF memorandum was approved by the Chiefs-of-Staff and Churchill; it recommended that the British airborne forces should consist of two parachute brigades, one based in England and the other in the Middle East, and that a glider force of 10,000 men should be created.

== Formation ==
On 23 April 1943, the War Office gave permission to raise a second airborne division, the 6th Airborne. The division comprised the 3rd and 5th Parachute Brigades and the 6th Airlanding Brigade, giving it two parachute and one airlanding brigades, which became the standard British complement for an airborne division. In May 1943 Brigadier Hugh Kindersley was appointed as the airlanding brigade's first Commanding Officer (CO). Under his command he had two experienced battalions transferred from the 1st Airlanding Brigade: the 2nd Battalion, Oxfordshire and Buckinghamshire Light Infantry (2nd OBLI) and the 1st Battalion, Royal Ulster Rifles (1st RUR). They were joined by a unit newly transferred to the airborne forces, the 12th Battalion, Devonshire Regiment (12th Devons), a hostilities-only unit formed during the war, as the brigade's third infantry battalion. Other units assigned around the same time were the 53rd (Worcestershire Yeomanry) Airlanding Light Regiment, Royal Artillery, the 249th (Airborne) Field Company, Royal Engineers and the 195th (Airlanding) Field Ambulance, Royal Army Medical Corps. (Note: By 1944, the 53rd (Worcestershire Yeomanry) Airlanding Light Regiment was removed from the brigade order of battle and became a divisional asset.)

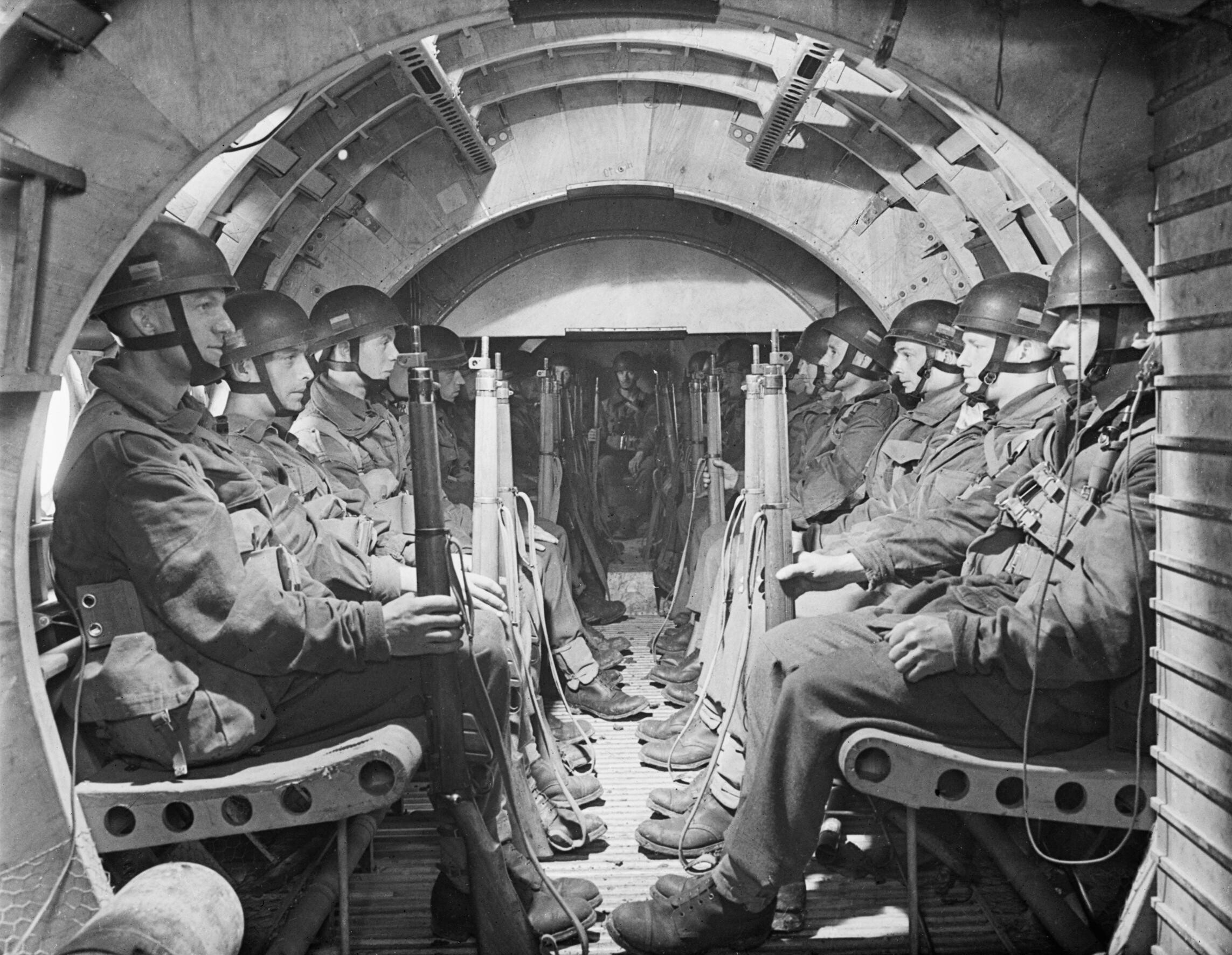
The interior of the Airspeed Horsa glider, which made up the great majority of the brigade's glider transport.

The airborne brigade was a crucial component of the airborne division because of its strength, which was nearly equal to the combined strength of the two parachute brigades. In particular, its infantry battalions were the "most heavily armed in the British Army." Each airlanding battalion had an establishment of 1034 men, serving in four rifle companies, a support and a headquarters company. A rifle company was sub-divided into four platoons, the support company into six: two anti-tank platoons with four 6 pounder guns in each, two mortar platoons with twelve 3 inch mortars between them, and two Vickers machine gun platoons with four guns in each platoon. The headquarters company had signals, assault pioneer, transport and administration platoons.

Air transport for the brigade was normally the Airspeed Horsa glider, piloted by two soldiers from the Glider Pilot Regiment. With a wingspan of 88 feet (27 m) and a length of 67 feet (20 m), the Horsa had a maximum load capacity of 15,750 pounds (7,140 kg)—space for two pilots, and a maximum of either 28 troops or two jeeps, one jeep and a 6 pounder gun, or one jeep with a trailer. It required 62 Horsas and one General Aircraft Hamilcar glider to transport an airlanding battalion into action. The Hamilcar carried the battalion's two Universal Carriers, which were used to support the mortar and machine-gun platoons.

At the end of the war in 1945, the 12th Battalion, Devonshire Regiment, formed during the war, was disbanded, and replaced by the 1st Battalion, Argyll and Sutherland Highlanders, of the Regular Army. Brigadier Roger Bower was also appointed to command the brigade for service in Palestine.

The 6th Airlanding Brigade had always been an integral part of the 6th Airborne Division, but when the 1st Airborne Division was disbanded, and its 1st Parachute Brigade was assigned to the 6th Airborne Division, the 6th Airlanding Brigade became surplus to the division's requirements. On 15 April 1946, the brigade ceased being part of the British Army's airborne forces, and was renumbered the 31st Independent Infantry Brigade.

== Operational history ==
From June to December 1943, the 6th Airlanding Brigade, as part of the 6th Airborne Division, prepared for operations, and trained at every level from section up to division by day and night. Airborne soldiers were expected to fight against superior numbers of the enemy equipped with artillery and tanks. So training was designed to encourage a spirit of self-discipline, self-reliance and aggressiveness. Emphasis was given to physical fitness, marksmanship and fieldcraft. A large part of the training consisted of assault courses and route marching. Military exercises included capturing and holding airborne bridgeheads, road or rail bridges and coastal fortifications. At the end of most exercises, the troops would march back to their barracks, usually a distance of around 20 miles (32 km). An ability to cover long distances at speed was expected: airborne platoons were required to cover a distance of 50 miles (80 km) in 24 hours, and battalions 32 miles (51 km).

In April 1944, under the command of I Airborne Corps, the brigade took part in Exercise Mush. This was a three-day exercise in the counties of Gloucestershire, Oxfordshire and Wiltshire, during which the entire 6th Airborne Division was landed by air. Unknown to the troops involved, the exercise was a full-scale rehearsal for the division's involvement in the imminent Allied invasion of Normandy. In the invasion, the 6th Airborne Division's two parachute brigades would land in the early hours of 6 June in Operation Tonga; the 6th Airlanding Brigade would not arrive until almost dusk on the same day. Their objective was to secure the left flank of the invasion area, between the rivers Orne and Dives.

=== Normandy ===
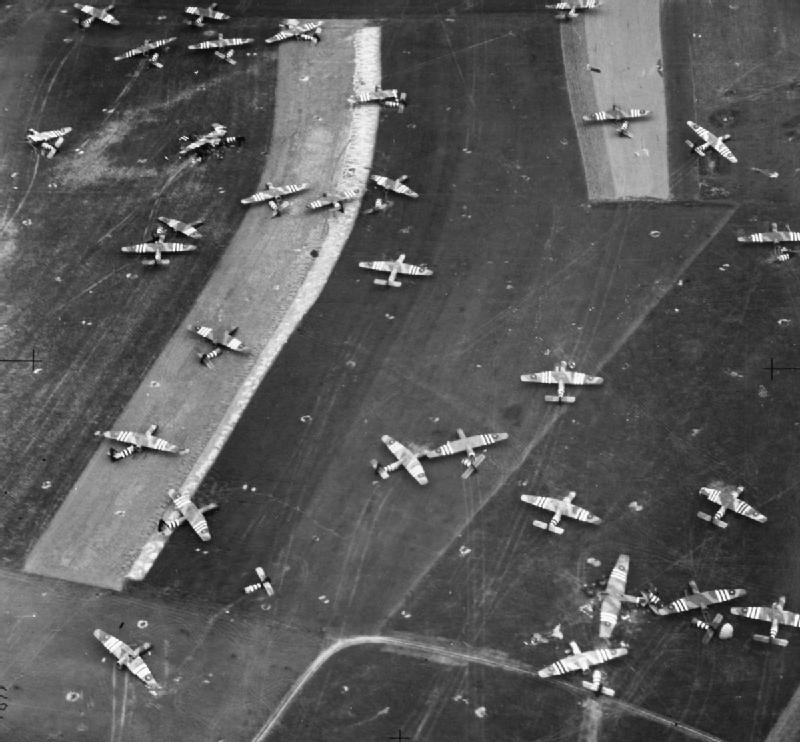
Airspeed Horsa gliders on Landing Zone 'N', 7 June 1944.

One of the first Allied units to land in Normandy was 'D' Company of the 2nd Ox and Bucks Light Infantry, commanded by Major John Howard. The company, attached to the 5th Parachute Brigade, captured the Caen canal and Orne river bridges via a coup de main assault.

Almost 21 hours later the 6th Airlanding Brigade's main air assault on Normandy, Operation Mallard, began. Included in the operation was the brigade, the 6th Airborne Division's reconnaissance regiment, and one of its howitzer batteries. The combined force crossed the English Channel in 250 gliders, arriving at their landing zones at 21:00 6 June 1944.

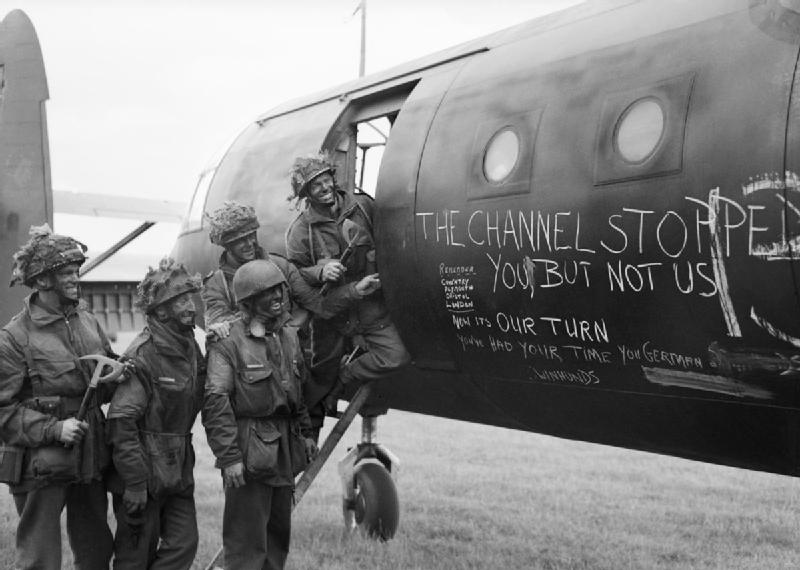
British airborne troops admire the graffiti chalked on the side of their glider as they prepare to fly out as part of the second drop on the night of 6 June 1944.

The gliders carrying the brigade headed for two separated landing areas, Landing Zone 'W' (LZ-W) to the east of Saint-Aubin-d'Arquenay and Landing Zone 'N' (LZ-N) to the north of Ranville. The gliders landing on LZ-W contained the remaining men of the 2nd OBLI, and 'A' Company, 12th Devons landed at LZ-W. Given the limited availability of aircraft, the remainder of the Devons battalion and the divisional troops were transported by sea, arriving at Sword Beach on 7 June. The brigade headquarters and 1st RUR landed at LZ-N. LZ-N was still within range of the German defenders, and the disembarking troops were subjected to light machine gun and mortar fire. However, they only lost one man, who was killed by a sniper.

At 22:30 Brigadier Kindersley briefed the two battalion COs ordering the 2nd OBLI to capture the village of Escoville 3 miles (4.8 km) to the south of Ranville, and the 1st RUR to capture Longueval, 2.5 miles (4.0 km) south-west of the Le Bas de Ranville, and Sainte-Honorine.

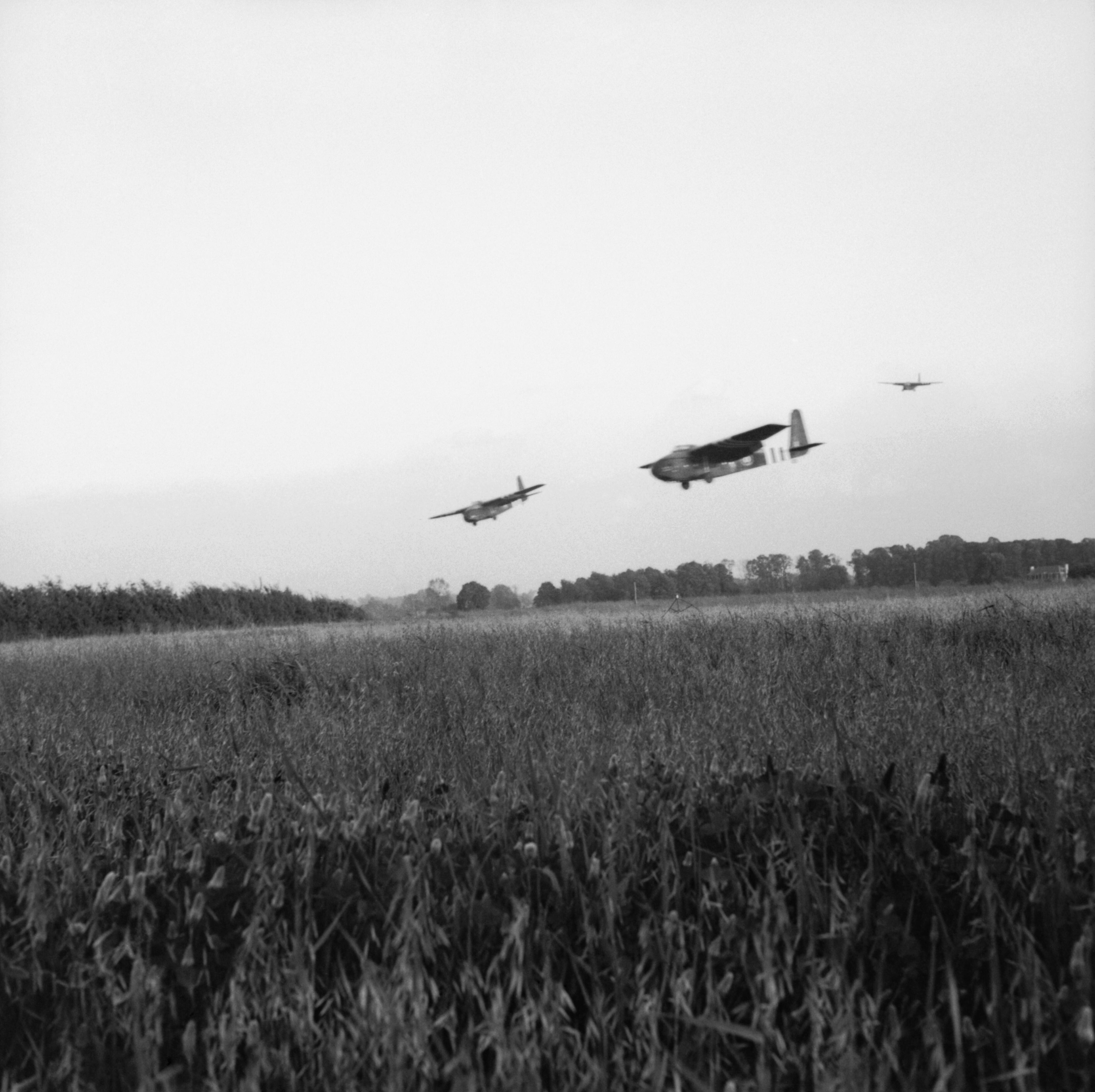
Hamilcar gliders of the 6th Airlanding Brigade arrive on DZ 'N' near Ranville, bringing with them the Tetrarch tanks of the 6th Airborne Division's armoured reconnaissance regiment, evening of 6 June 1944.

By 04:30 7 June 2 OBLI had reached Herourvillette. Finding the village unoccupied they left a company behind to defend it, and at 08:30 the rest of the battalion headed for Escoville. They arrived at the village at 11:00 having only been confronted by sniper fire. The Germans assembling on the heights overlooking the village attacked at 15:00. Fighting at close quarters and house to house, by 16:00 the battalion was forced to withdraw back to Herourvillette. The battle cost them 87 casualties, including the CO.

It was not until 09:00 that the 1st RUR were in position to carry out a left flanking attack on Longuerval. The village was clear of Germans so they pressed on towards Sainte-Honorine. When between the two villages, the battalion was engaged by German mortar, artillery and assault gun fire, and suffered several casualties. Two companies managed to reach Sainte-Honorine, but with no artillery fire support of their own, and out of radio contact with their battalion headquarters, they were forced to withdraw back to Longueval.

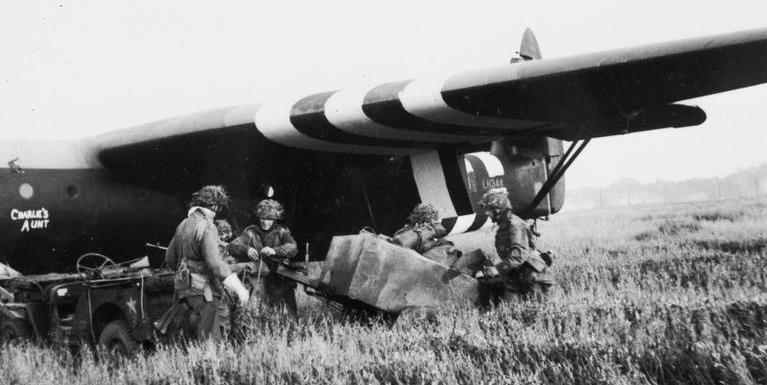
Airborne troops of the 6th Airlanding Brigade hitching a trailer to a jeep which has just been off-loaded from a Horsa glider (LH344 'Charlie's Aunt') on DZ 'N' near Ranville, on the evening of 6 June 1944.

Around the same time, the 12th Devons had arrived in the divisional area from the landing beaches and were ordered to take over the defence of the Bas de Ranville from the 12th Parachute Battalion. Because they were positioned behind the brigade front line, they were not directly attacked, but from 11:00 to 18:30 on 8 June they were subjected to a constant artillery bombardment.

On 9 June 2 OBLI sent a company back to Escoville to confirm if it was still held by the Germans. Finding it occupied by infantry with armour support, they withdrew back to Herourvillette. At 18:30 the battalion was attacked by Messerschmitt Bf 109 aircraft and at 19:00 the whole brigade's position was bombarded by German artillery and mortar fire. This was followed by an infantry and tank assault. Supported by their own and the division's anti-tank guns and artillery, the battalion stopped the attack around 100 yards (91 m) from their lines. By 21:30 the attack was over, and the Germans withdrew, having lost eight tanks, two armoured cars and two self-propelled guns.

At the same time, German tanks and infantry attacked the 12th Devons. By 20:30 they had advanced to within 50 yards (46 m) of the battalion's positions. With the airborne artillery regiment busy assisting the 2nd OBLI, the Devons had to call on the artillery from the British 3rd Infantry Division to break up the attack. Activity over the next few days was limited to skirmishes and patrol activity, until the night of 13 June when the brigade was relieved by units of the 51st (Highland) Infantry Division. The brigade was repositioned in the area of Breville between the 5th Parachute Brigade and the commandos of the 1st Special Service Brigade. Here they remained in a defensive position until mid August, conducting patrols to hold the Germans' attention.

=== Advance to the Seine ===
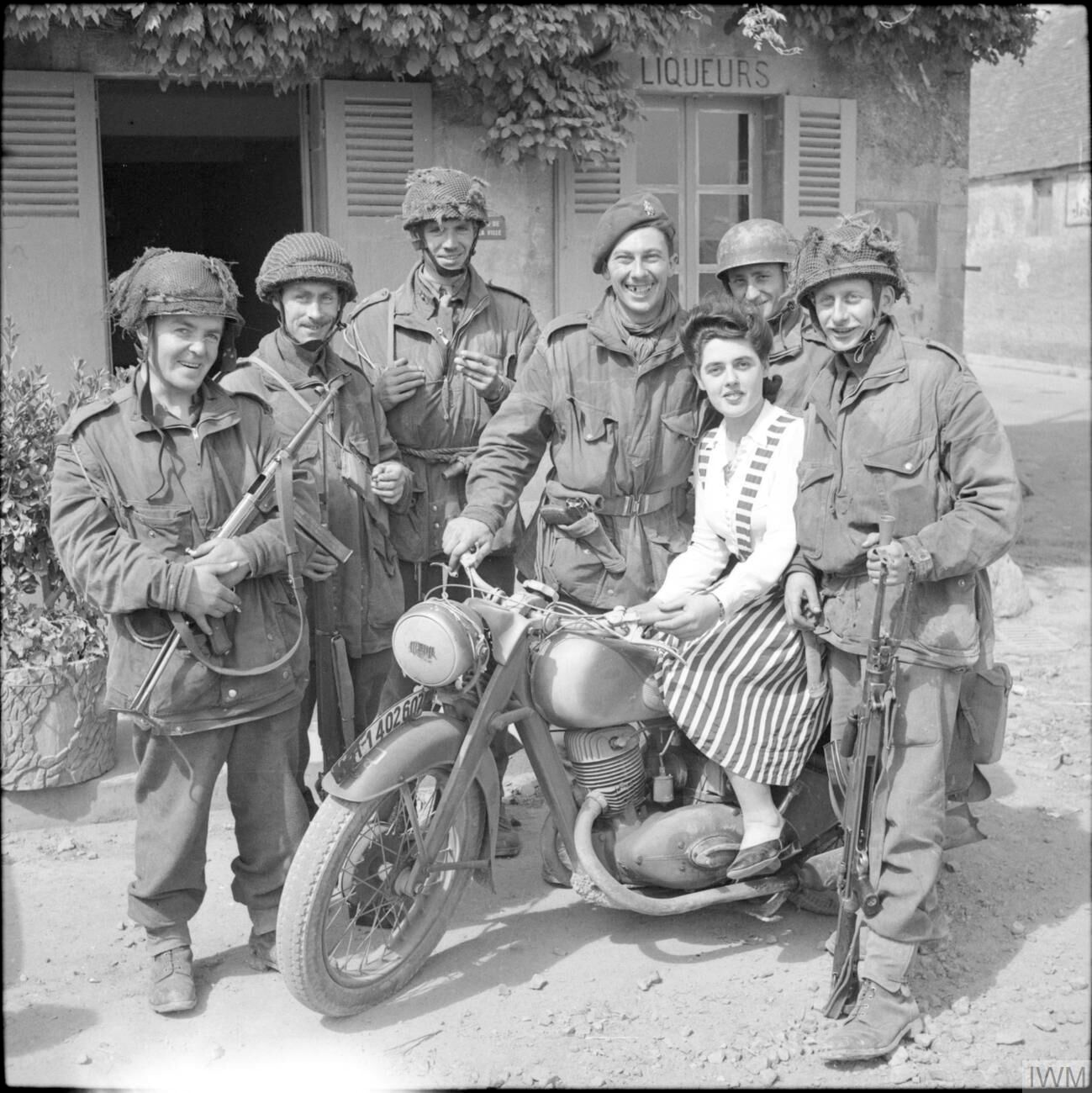
Men of the 6th Airlanding Brigade in France, 1944.

On 7 August the 6th Airborne division was ordered to prepare to move over to the offensive, with its objective being the mouth of the River Seine. The division began to advance as the Germans retreated from France following their defeat in the Battle of Falaise. The 6th Airlanding Brigade, now commanded by Brigadier Edwin Flavell, had the 1st Belgian Infantry Brigade and the Royal Netherlands Motorized Infantry Brigade under its command. Together they would form the left flank of the division's advance, moving along the French coast, while the remainder of the division advanced further inland.

The 6th Airlanding Brigade advance started on 17 August along two axes, with the 12th Devons on the left, the 2nd OBLI on the right, and the 1st RUR in reserve. At Longuemare the 12th Devons had to fight through the German rearguard, and the 1st RUR took over the advance on the left and reached Cabourg without meeting any further resistance.

The brigade group was moved to an area east of Troarn on 21 August. With the 12th Devons leading they advanced again, occupying Branville, Vauville and Deauville on 22 August. Attempts to cross the River Touques were repulsed by a force estimated to be around 1,200 men. Outflanking the German position, the 2nd OBLI crossed the river at Touques on 24 August. Keeping the pressure on the retreating Germans on 25 August, Le Correspondence, Petreville and Malhortie were captured. However, the Germans had retained control of the bridge outside Malhortie and the high ground at Manneville-la-Raoult. The 2nd OBLI attacked and captured the bridge intact, but Mannerville-la-Raoult was only taken at dusk, at the cost of several casualties. The next day, 26 August, the battalion captured Foulbec on the River Seine at 19:00, although not before the Germans had destroyed the bridge, and earlier that day the 1st RUR had captured Berville-sur-Mer. On 27 August the division was ordered to concentrate in the area between Honfleur and Pont Audemer.

In nine days of fighting the 6th Airborne Division had advanced 45 miles (72 km), despite, as the divisional commander, Major-General Richard Nelson Gale put it, his infantry units being "quite inadequately equipped for a rapid pursuit". The division had captured 400 square miles (1,000 km^{2}) of territory and taken over 1,000 German soldiers prisoner. Since landing on 6 June the division's casualties were 4,457, of which 821 were killed, 2,709 wounded and 927 missing. The 6th Airlanding Brigade suffered 115 men killed during the campaign. The division was withdrawn from France, and embarked for England at the beginning of September.

=== Ardennes ===
In England the brigade went into a period of recruitment and training, concentrating on house to house street fighting in the bombed areas of Southampton and Birmingham. The training programme culminated in Exercise Eve, an assault on the River Thames, which was intended to simulate the River Rhine in Germany.

By December the brigade was preparing for Christmas leave, when news of the German offensive in the Ardennes broke. As part of the First Allied Airborne Army, 6th Airborne Division was available as a component of the strategic reserve for the Allied forces in northwest Europe. The other two divisions available in reserve, the American 82nd and 101st Airborne, were already at Rheims in northern France, and the 6th Airborne was sent by sea to Belgium to assist the defence. With 29 German and 33 Allied divisions involved, the Battle of the Bulge was the largest single battle on the Western Front during the war. On Christmas Day the division moved up to take position in front of the spearhead of the German advance; by Boxing Day they had reached their allocated places in the defensive line between Dinant and Namur. The 3rd Parachute Brigade were on the left, 5th Parachute Brigade on the right, and the airlanding brigade in reserve. Over the next days the German advance was halted and forced back, until at the end of January 1945, the brigade crossed into the Netherlands. Here the division was made responsible for the area along the River Maas, between Venlo and Roermond. The brigade carried out patrols, on both sides of the river, against their opponents from the 7th Parachute Division. Near the end of February the division returned to England to prepare for another airborne mission, to cross the River Rhine into Germany.

=== Rhine ===
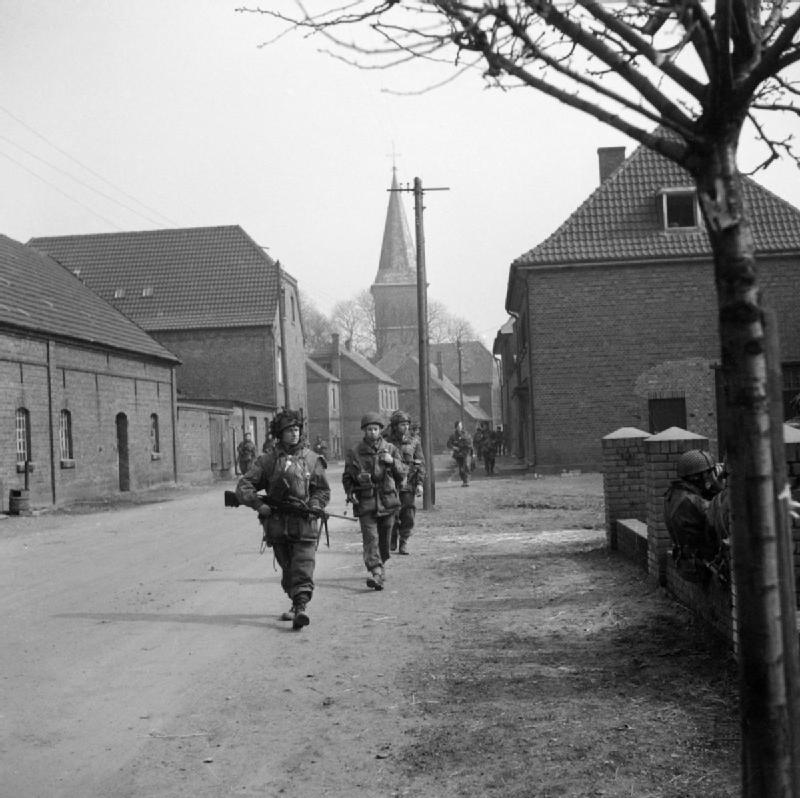
Airborne troops marching through Hamminkeln, Germany, 25 March 1945.

Whereas all other Allied airborne landings had been a surprise for the Germans, the Rhine crossing was expected, and their defences were reinforced in anticipation. The airborne operation was preceded by a two-day round-the-clock bombing mission by the Allied air forces. Then on 23 March 3,500 artillery guns targeted the German positions. At dusk Operation Plunder, an assault river crossing of the Rhine by the 21st Army Group, began. For their part in Operation Varsity, the British 6th Airborne Division was assigned to the U.S. XVIII Airborne Corps, under Major General Matthew Ridgway, alongside Major General William Miley's U.S. 17th Airborne Division.

The 6th Airlanding Brigade, now commanded by Brigadier Hugh Bellamy, was given several objectives in the operation. The 2nd OBLI, landing in the north, had to secure the bridges over the River Issel. The 1st RUR had the main road bridge over the river from Hamminkeln to Brunen as their objective, and the 12th Devons were to capture the town of Hamminkeln.

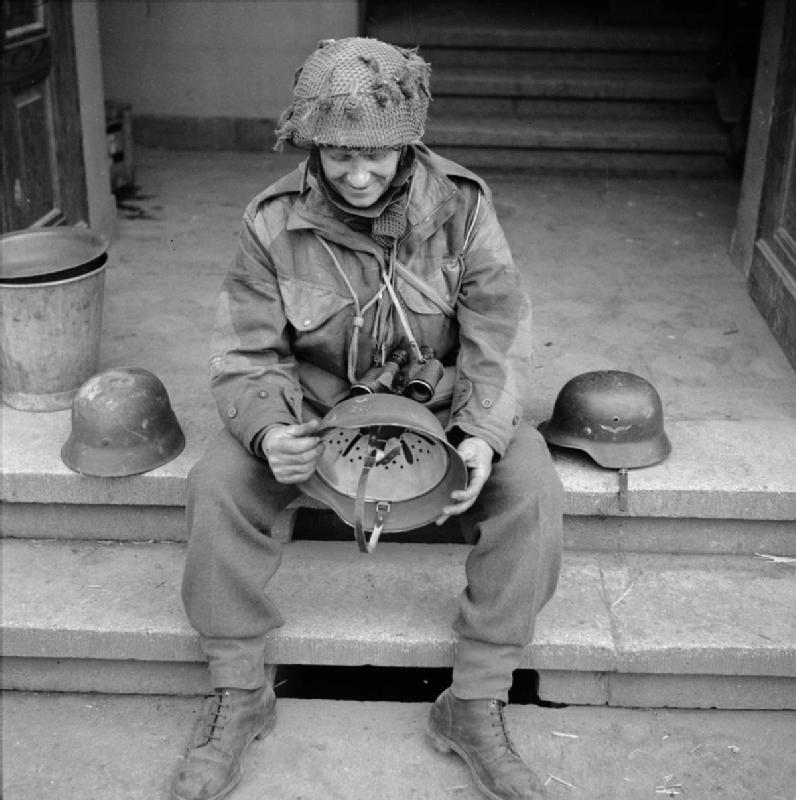
Regimental Sergeant Major Allen of the 12th Battalion, Devonshire Regiment examines captured German helmets in Hamminkeln, 25 March 1945.

As in Normandy, the division's two parachute brigades were already on the ground before the 6th Airlanding Brigade started landing at 10:30 24 March 1945. The German defenders had been alerted, and the gliders were met by a concentrated anti-aircraft barrage. This caused the brigade around 40 per cent casualties in men and 50 per cent in equipment. (Note: The landings cost the brigade over 472 dead; 2nd OBLI had 103 dead and over 100 wounded, 1st RUR had 259 dead, and 12th Devons had 110 dead and 30 wounded. Only five of the sixty-three gliders transporting 1st RUR landed completely intact.) Nevertheless, by 11:00 the 2nd OBLI and 1st RUR had captured their objectives. The 12th Devons landed amongst a German armoured formation, but managed to gather enough men together to begin their attack on Hamminkeln at 11:35, and had secured the town by 12:00.

At midnight the 2nd OBLI were attacked by a force of tanks and infantry. One of the battalion positions at the eastern side of the road bridge was overrun, and had to be recaptured with a counter-attack. Another attack two hours later was in danger of capturing the bridge, so Brigadier Bellamy ordered it blown up. German infantry attempted to infiltrate the brigade's positions throughout the night. At 05:30 German armour was detected approaching and the brigade called in close air support from RAF Typhoon fighter bombers, which destroyed several tanks. The main road bridge, held by 1st RUR, was attacked at 07:00 by infantry and two tanks. The attack failed when the tanks were destroyed by the division's anti-tank guns. Later that day infantry from the 15th Scottish Infantry Division, supported by tanks, had advanced to the divisional area and took over the brigade's position. At the same time the division was ordered to prepare to advance eastwards from dawn on 26 March.

=== Germany ===
On 26 March the brigade advanced further into Germany, with the 1st RUR and the 12th Devons leading. The only opposition was German rearguard actions, and they reached Rhade by that evening and Limbeck the following day. They crossed the Dortmund–Ems Canal at dawn on 2 April, unopposed except for artillery fire. Later that day there was more resistance when they reached Lengerich. By 4 April the brigade was moving forward as fast as possible, supported by the 4th (Armoured) Battalion, Grenadier Guards, part of the 6th Guards Tank Brigade. Steinhuder Meer was reached on 10 April, then in the following days Ulzen and Lüneburg were captured. By 2 May they had reached the River Elbe. Expecting it to be defended in force, the division attacked at once, trying to catch the defenders unaware. The attack was successful and the river was crossed over a pontoon bridge left intact by the retreating Germans. That afternoon the leading troops of the 3rd Parachute Brigade reached Mecklenburg and made contact with the leading men from the Russian Army advancing from the east. Later that day the brigade reached Wismar on the Baltic Sea, and remained there until 7 May when news was received of the German surrender.

=== Post-war ===
At the end of May 1945, the division was pulled out of Germany and returned to England. It was initially intended to send them to India to form an airborne corps with the 44th Indian Airborne Division. The division's advance party, formed around the 5th Parachute Brigade, had already arrived in India. Following the Japanese surrender, all these plans changed. The post-war British Army only needed one airborne division, and the 6th Airborne was chosen to remain on strength. Reinforced by the 2nd Parachute Brigade, the division was sent to the Middle East as the Imperial Strategic Reserve.

On 10 October 1945, the brigade arrived at the port of Haifa, and after disembarking moved to Gaza. After a short period of acclimatisation, the 6th Airlanding Brigade was deployed in the Samaria region, with the brigade headquarters at Lydda airfield. At the same time, the 6th Battalion, Gordon Highlanders, based at Tulkarm, came under the brigade's command. The first incident in the brigade area was on 31 October, when parties of armed Jews planted explosives on rail lines, which killed four and wounded eight when they exploded. Following attacks on coastguard stations, believed to be by members of the Palmach, over the night of 24/25 November, the brigade carried out two operations to search settlements for those responsible. On 29 March 1946 the brigade was relocated to Jerusalem in preparation for leaving the division. On 3 April the 1st Parachute Brigade, which had been assigned to the division, arrived in Palestine. Their arrival made the glider formation surplus to requirements, so on 15 April the brigade was renumbered 31st Independent Infantry Brigade, and was no longer part of the British airborne forces.

== Order of battle ==
Commanders

- Brigadier Hugh Kindersley (1943–1944)
- Brigadier Edwin Flavell (1944–1945)
- Brigadier Hugh Bellamy (1945)
- Brigadier Roger Bower (1945–1946)

Units assigned

- 2nd Battalion, Oxfordshire and Buckinghamshire Light Infantry
- 1st Battalion, Royal Ulster Rifles
- 12th Battalion, Devonshire Regiment
- 53rd (Worcestershire Yeomanry) Airlanding Light Regiment – Royal Artillery
- 249th (Airborne) Field Company – Royal Engineers
- 195th (Airlanding) Field Ambulance – Royal Army Medical Corps

Units attached

- 1st Belgian Infantry Brigade
- Royal Netherlands Motorized Infantry Brigade
- 6th Battalion, Gordon Highlanders

== Notes ==
Footnotes

Citations
