= Colonel Anderson =

Colonel Anderson may refer to:

- Charles DeWitt Anderson (1827–1901), Confederate colonel
- William Herbert Anderson (1881–1918), Lieutenant-Colonel
- Maurice Anderson (1908–1986), Lieutenant-Colonel
