= Hugh Bellamy =

British Army officer (1910–1972)

- Born: 8 December 1910
- Died: 27 November 1972 (aged 61)
- Military career
- Allegiance: United Kingdom
- Branch: British Army
- Service years: 1930–1958
- Rank: Brigadier
- Service number: 47518
- Unit: Duke of Cornwall's Light Infantry
- Commands: 40th Infantry Division; 2nd Parachute Brigade (1946–1948); 1st Parachute Brigade (1945–1946); 6th Airlanding Brigade (1945); 1st Battalion Royal Norfolk Regiment (1943–1945)
- Conflicts: Second World War; Palestine Emergency
- Awards: Commander of the Order of the British Empire; Distinguished Service Order & Bar; Mentioned in Despatches (2)

Brigadier Robert Hugh Bellamy CBE, DSO & Bar (8 December 1910 – 27 November 1972) was a senior British Army officer who commanded the 6th Airlanding Brigade during the Rhine Crossing on 24 March 1945 and in the advance across Germany during the Second World War.

== Early life ==
Born Robert Hugh Bellamy, he was educated at Sherborne School, a British boys' independent school, and then at the Royal Military College, Sandhurst.

== Military career ==
After passing out from Sandhurst, Bellamy was commissioned as a second lieutenant into the Duke of Cornwall's Light Infantry on 28 August 1930. He was promoted to lieutenant on 29 August 1930. He served in the Battle of France with the 2nd Battalion, DCLI, in 1940 and was mentioned in despatches for his services in December. He was promoted to lieutenant colonel in 1943 and served in Northwest Europe during 1944 and 1945, as Commanding Officer (CO) of the 1st Battalion, Royal Norfolk Regiment, which he had been promoted to command in October 1943. Bellamy commanded the battalion during the D-Day landings and the subsequent Battle of Normandy and the Northwest Europe Campaign.

Bellamy was promoted to brigadier in January 1945 and took over command of 6th Airlanding Brigade, part of 6th Airborne Division. He commanded the Brigade during Operation Varsity, the air assault landing over the Rhine on 24 March 1945, and during the advance across Germany to the Baltic. He was awarded a Bar to his DSO on 10 October 1945. Bellamy remained in command of 6th Airlanding Brigade following its move to Palestine in 1945 and was mentioned in despatches again. He commanded the 2nd Parachute Brigade in Palestine and the British Army of the Rhine (BAOR) from 1946 to 1948. He was Deputy Director of Weapons Development at the War Office from 1950 to 1952. He was Deputy General Officer Commanding Hong Kong and General Officer Commanding 40th Infantry Division from 1954 to 1956. Bellamy was appointed a Commander of the Order of the British Empire in 1956. He was Chief of Staff, 1 Corps (BAOR) from 1956 to 1958. He retired from the British Army in 1958, and lived in Belgravia, London.

He married Kathleen Louisa Isabel Lascelles in 1940 with whom he was to have one son and one daughter. The marriage was dissolved in 1953.

Brigadier Hugh Bellamy died on 27 November 1972.

== Bibliography ==
- Allen, Peter. (1980). One More River: The Rhine Crossings of 1945. Charles Scribner Sons.
- Harclerode, Peter. (2000). "Go To It!": The Illustrated History of the 6th Airborne Division. Caxton.
- Norton, G. G. (1971). The Red Devils: The Story of the British Airborne Forces (Leo Cooper Famous Regiment Series). Leo Cooper Ltd.
- (1981). Who Was Who, Vol V11: 1971–1980.
