= Operation Mallard =

1944 British airborne operation

- Part of the Normandy landings
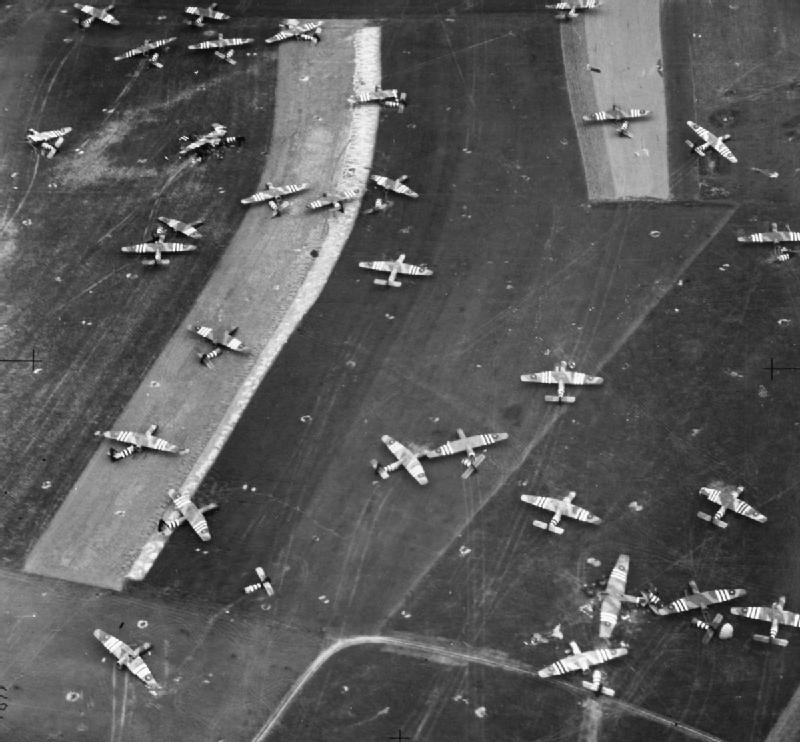
- Landing zone 'N' 7 June 1944
Date	6 June 1944
Location	Normandy 49°02′N 0°15′W
Result	British victory

Belligerents
United Kingdom	Germany

Commanders and leaders
(United Kingdom) Richard Gale (United Kingdom) Hugh Kindersley	(Nazi Germany) Wilhelm Richter (Nazi Germany) Edgar Feuchtinger

Units involved
6th Airborne Division	716th Infantry Division; 21st Panzer Division

Operation Mallard was the codename for an airborne forces operation, which was conducted by the British Army on 6 June 1944, as part of the Normandy landings during the Second World War.

The objective was to airlift glider infantry of the 6th Airlanding Brigade and divisional troops to reinforce the 6th Airborne Division on the left flank of the British invasion beaches. Using two landing zones, one to the west of the Caen Canal and the other to the east of the River Orne, Mallard was the third airborne operation involving units of the division on D-Day. The first of the Caen Canal and Orne River bridges to be captured, were what are now known as the Pegasus Bridge and Horsa Bridge. Operation Tonga followed, dropping the division's two parachute brigades near Caen to the east.

Mallard proved successful with 246 of the 256 gliders towed by aircraft from No. 38 Group RAF and No. 48 Group, arriving safely at their landing zones. The landings included the first Tetrarch tanks to be delivered into combat by air.

== Background ==
Plans for the Normandy invasion included five assault landings from the sea, supported by airborne landings on both flanks by British and American airborne divisions. In what would be its first action, the 6th Airborne Division was chosen to land on the left flank of the British landing zone. Its primary objective on day one was to capture intact two bridges over the Caen Canal and the River Orne. The division's secondary objective was the destruction of the Merville gun battery, which could engage ships landing nearby at Sword Beach. To prevent German reinforcements approaching the invasion area from the east, 6th Airborne also had to destroy the bridges crossing the River Dives then dig in around Ranville and hold the left flank of the advance.

The two bridges were captured by a glider infantry assault by a reinforced company from the 2nd Battalion Oxfordshire and Buckinghamshire Light Infantry (2nd OBLI). As part of Operation Tonga, the division's secondary objectives involved its two parachute brigades. The 5th Parachute Brigade provided a defence in depth for the captured bridges, deploying to the east and west of the canal and river. The 3rd Parachute Brigade destroyed the Merville gun battery along with the bridges crossing the Dives, then fell back to form a defensive line to the east of 5th Parachute Brigade.

The strength of the airborne division's third formation, the 6th Airlanding Brigade, almost equalled that of the two parachute brigades. The constant shortage of transport aircraft meant that the airlanding brigade could not be transported to Normandy at the same time as the rest of the division. Each of the brigade's three infantry battalions consisted of 806 men in four rifle companies, made up of four platoons along with a support company consisting of two Anti-tank platoons both armed with four 6 pounder guns, two mortar platoons each with six 3 inch mortars, and two Vickers machine gun platoons. There was no fixed plan for troops arriving as part of Operation Mallard – all would depend on how well the preceding units of the 6th Airborne Division and those landing at Sword had done during the day. But if all had gone to plan they were to cross both waterways and expand the divisions position to the south.

=== Gliders ===
Planes returning from the first missions were refuelled and repaired where required and made ready to tow the gliders that evening. The airlift included 226 Airspeed Horsa gliders, each piloted by two men from the Glider Pilot Regiment. With a wingspan of 88 feet (27 m) and a length of 67 feet (20 m), the Horsa had a maximum load capacity of 15,750 pounds (7,140 kg) as well as space for two pilots, a maximum of twenty-eight troops or two jeeps, one jeep and an artillery gun or one jeep with a trailer.

The division's heavier equipment was carried in thirty General Aircraft Hamilcar gliders. Twenty of these would carry Tetrarch light tanks and their crews belonging to 6th Airborne Armoured Reconnaissance Regiment, four more carried three Rota trailers carrying fuel supplies without crews, another three transported, Universal Carriers with their crews. The last three carried two Universal Carriers converted to accommodate a 3-inch mortar, one Universal Carrier equipped with a slave battery, sixteen motorcycles and a jeep.

=== German forces ===
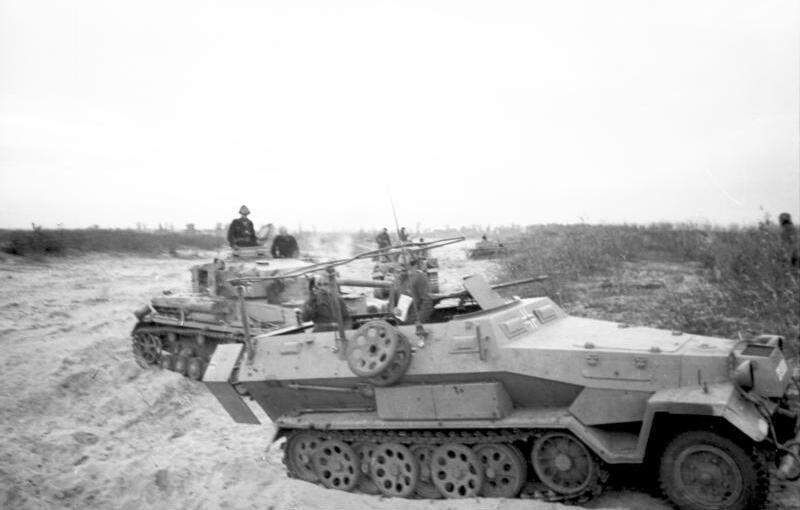
German Panzer IV and halftrack, similar to types used by the 21st Panzer Division.

The coastal area was guarded by the 716th Infantry Division. comprising eight infantry battalions deployed to defend 21 miles (34 km) of the Atlantic wall. Poorly equipped with a mixture of foreign weapons, the unit was manned by conscripts from Poland, Russia and France under a German officer and senior Non commissioned officers.

A second division, the 21st Panzer Division, moved into the area in May 1944 with its battalions positioned at Vimont just east of Caen, and at Cairon to the west of the Caen canal bridge. The 21st Panzer Division was a new formation based on the former Africa Korps unit destroyed in North Africa. Although equipped with an assortment of older tanks and other armoured vehicles, the division's officers were veterans and 2,000 men from the old division filled its ranks. Further afield were the 12th SS Panzer Division at Lisieux and the Panzer Lehr Division at Chartres, both less than a day's march from the area.

== Mallard ==
A Horsa glider, which crashed through a stone wall during landing.

In response to the initial airborne and naval landings, just after noon on 6 June, 21st Panzer Division received permission to attack. The commanders were informed by General Erich Marcks of LXXXVII Army Corps that:

"if you don't succeed in throwing the British back into the sea, we shall have lost the war."

East of the River Orne, the 125th Panzergrenadier Regiment headed towards the captured bridges. The column was quickly spotted and engaged for the next two hours by Allied artillery and aircraft causing heavy losses. At 16:00, to the west of the Caen canal, 1st Battalion, 192nd Panzergrenadier Regiment and the 100th Panzer Regiment successfully reached the coast between the British Sword and the Canadian Juno. Here they linked up with the 736th Infantry Regiment, which had been defending Lion sur Mer. The German units gathered their strength on the beaches and waited for further orders from divisional commander Generalmajor Edgar Feuchtinger.

Back in England, 256 Operation Mallard gliders carrying the remaining men and equipment of the 6th Airborne Division took off. Fifteen squadrons of fighter aircraft were deployed by the RAF to escort the gliders and towing aircraft. The force crossed the English Channel unhindered, and arrived in Normandy at 21:00. As it was still daylight, previous navigation problems that had affected the earlier operations were absent. As the gliders approached the two landing areas they met with anti-aircraft fire from German defenders on the ground.

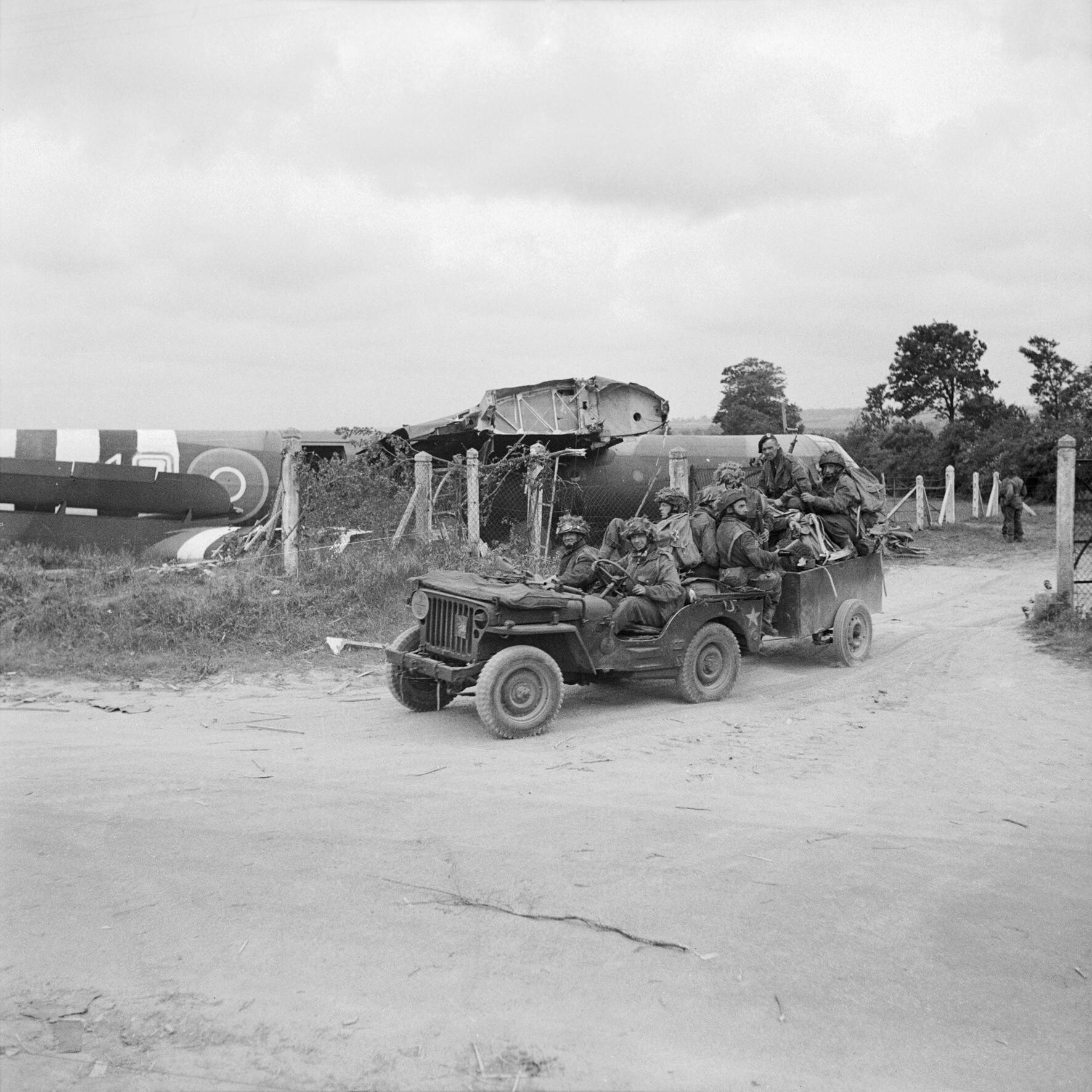
Riflemen of the 1st Battalion, Royal Ulster Rifles, of 6th Airlanding Brigade, aboard a jeep and trailer, driving off Landing Zone 'N'.

The gliders headed for two landing areas, Landing Zone 'W' (LZW) to the east of Saint-Aubin-d'Arquenay and Landing Zone 'N' (LZN) to the north of Ranville. The remaining troops of the 2nd OBLI and 'A' Company, 12th Battalion, Devonshire Regiment landed at LZW. Given the limited availability of aircraft, even two lifts did not provide capacity to transport all of the Devonshire battalion, the rest of whom arrived by sea on 7 June. The 6th Airlanding Brigade headquarters, 1st Battalion, Royal Ulster Rifles and the 6th Airborne Armoured Reconnaissance Regiment landed at LZN, the latter equipped with the Tetrarch light tank – the first time that any tank had been flown into battle by air. Watching the arriving gliders, Major-General Richard Nelson Gale later wrote:

"It is impossible to say with what relief we watched this reinforcement arrive."

German reaction to the second airborne landings involved mortar barrages and small arms fire, but casualties were negligible. Generalmajor Feuchtinger of 21st Panzer Division watched the gliders descending and, believing the arriving force would threaten his lines of communication, ordered those elements of the division that had reached the beaches to withdraw to the north of Caen. The gliders' arrival had inadvertently stopped the only German armoured attack on D-Day.

Moving off LZN the 1st Battalion, Royal Ulster Rifles headed south to capture the villages of Longueval and Sainte-Honorine-de-Chardronnette. The 211th Battery, 53rd (Worcester Yeomanry) Airlanding Light Regiment, Royal Artillery then arrived at LZN equipped with eight 75 mm Pack Howitzers and were engaging German targets less than thirty minutes after landing. The 2nd Battalion, Oxfordshire and Buckinghamshire Light Infantry, who were the furthest away at LZW, crossed the Caen canal and River Orne bridges. These had been captured twenty-one hours earlier by their own 'D' Company who were now headed towards Herouvillette and Escoville. By midnight, the 6th Airborne Division was the only Allied formation to have seized all of its D-Day objectives.

== Aftermath ==
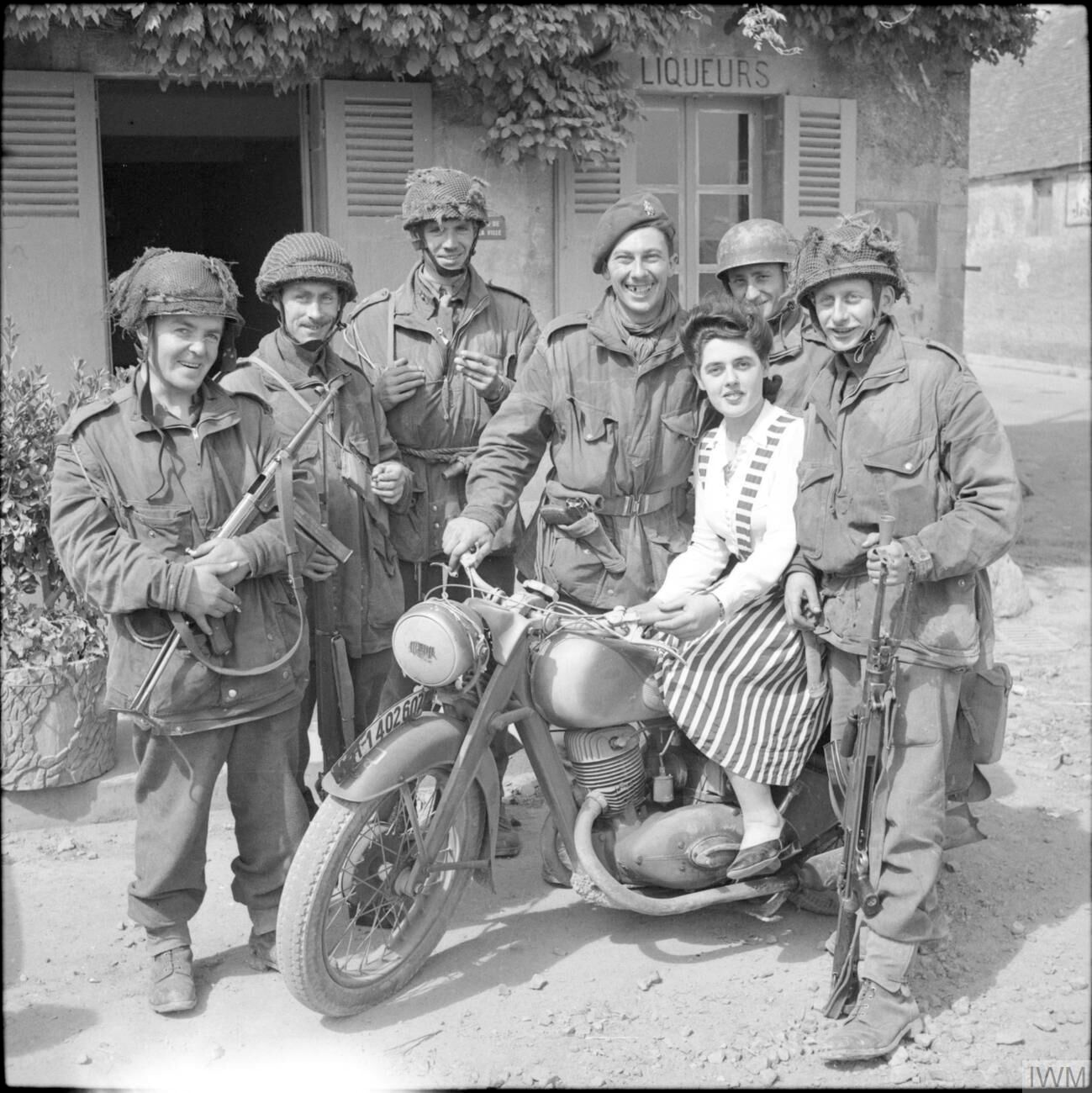
Glider troops and a French civilian, 15 June 1944.

Reinforcement by the 6th Airlanding Brigade strengthened the 6th Airborne Division's weak position. Most of the parachute battalions, because of their scattered parachute drops, were well under strength.

By 11:00 on 7 June, 2nd Battalion, Oxfordshire and Buckinghamshire Light Infantry had occupied Escoville 3 miles (4.8 km) to the south of Ranville. The 1st Battalion, Royal Ulster Rifles, occupied Longueval 2.5 miles (4.0 km) south-west of the Bas de Ranville unopposed. Ordered to advance another 1 mile (1.6 km) to Sainte-Honorine, the battalion was caught in the open by German artillery and by mistake the guns of HMS Arethusa. While unable to proceed, the battalion remained in control of Longueval. The 12th Battalion, Devonshire Regiment arrived in the evening of 7 June and took over defence of the Bas de Ranville.

D-Day had cost the 6th Airborne Division 821 dead, 2,709 wounded and 927 missing. The division remained holding the Orne bridgehead, only taking part in patrols and small scale local attacks until the 17 August when it crossed the River Dives. By 27 August, the division had reached Berville sur Mer, where it halted and remained until the beginning of September when it was withdrawn back to England.
