= Maurice Anderson =

British lieutenant-Colonel/195th Field Ambulance

Lieutenant-Colonel William Maurice E Anderson MD, DSO (often referred to as Bill Anderson despite the fact he went by the name of Maurice), joined the British 6th Airborne Division in 1943, and became CO of the 195th (Airlanding) Field Ambulance. (1)(4)

== Biography ==
On D-Day he arrived at Ranville, France by glider and was wounded by sniper fire two days later at Longueval (2). He recovered (unlike the sniper, who was killed by a Royal Ulster Rifleman) and subsequently participated in the Ardennes offensive (the Battle of the Bulge) and Rhine crossings (Operation Varsity). In the latter operation his unit saw around 400 casualties during the 30 hours after landing. In 1945 he was part of the force that liberated Belsen and shook hands with the Russians on the banks of the River Elbe (3). He was then invited to form the No2 Medical Commando with a view to fighting the Japanese, but this was cancelled by the subsequent bombing and surrender of Japan.

He died 13 December 1986 aged 78, succeeded by one son – Lieutenant-Colonel (Retd) William Robert George ("Robin") Anderson.

Lieutenant-Colonel W.M.E. Anderson (63162) D.S.O. Citation:

At Hamminkeln on 24 March 1945, Lieutenant-Colonel Anderson was in command of 195 Airlanding Field Ambulance, which collected, treated and held over four hundred casualties for well over thirty hours. Conditions were difficult at first due to sustained enemy fire and later on due to limited accommodation and numbers of casualties mounting rapidly, but Colonel Anderson dealt so decisively and actively with each difficulty that at no time was the well being of the patients endangered. At no time did he allow enemy activity which was particularly violent during the early stages to interfere with the cool and skilful exercise of his duties.

At Longueval, Normandy on 10 June 1944, the Regimental Aid Post of the 1st Royal Ulster Rifles was attacked by a company of enemy infantry, several patients loaded on jeeps being killed and wounded. Colonel Anderson although himself badly wounded by the first burst of fire, organised and personally assisted the removal of the patients to cover. He afterwards led the convoy through the enemy lines and not until reaching his Main Dressing Station would he allow his wound to be dressed.

Throughout the campaign BLA, whether in France, the Ardennes or Germany, this officer has shown a consistently high standard of gallantry and devotion to duty.
