= Capture of the Caen Canal and Orne River bridges =

British airborne operation on 6 June 1944

Coordinates: 49°14′32″N 0°16′28″W

- Part of Operation Tonga of the Normandy landings
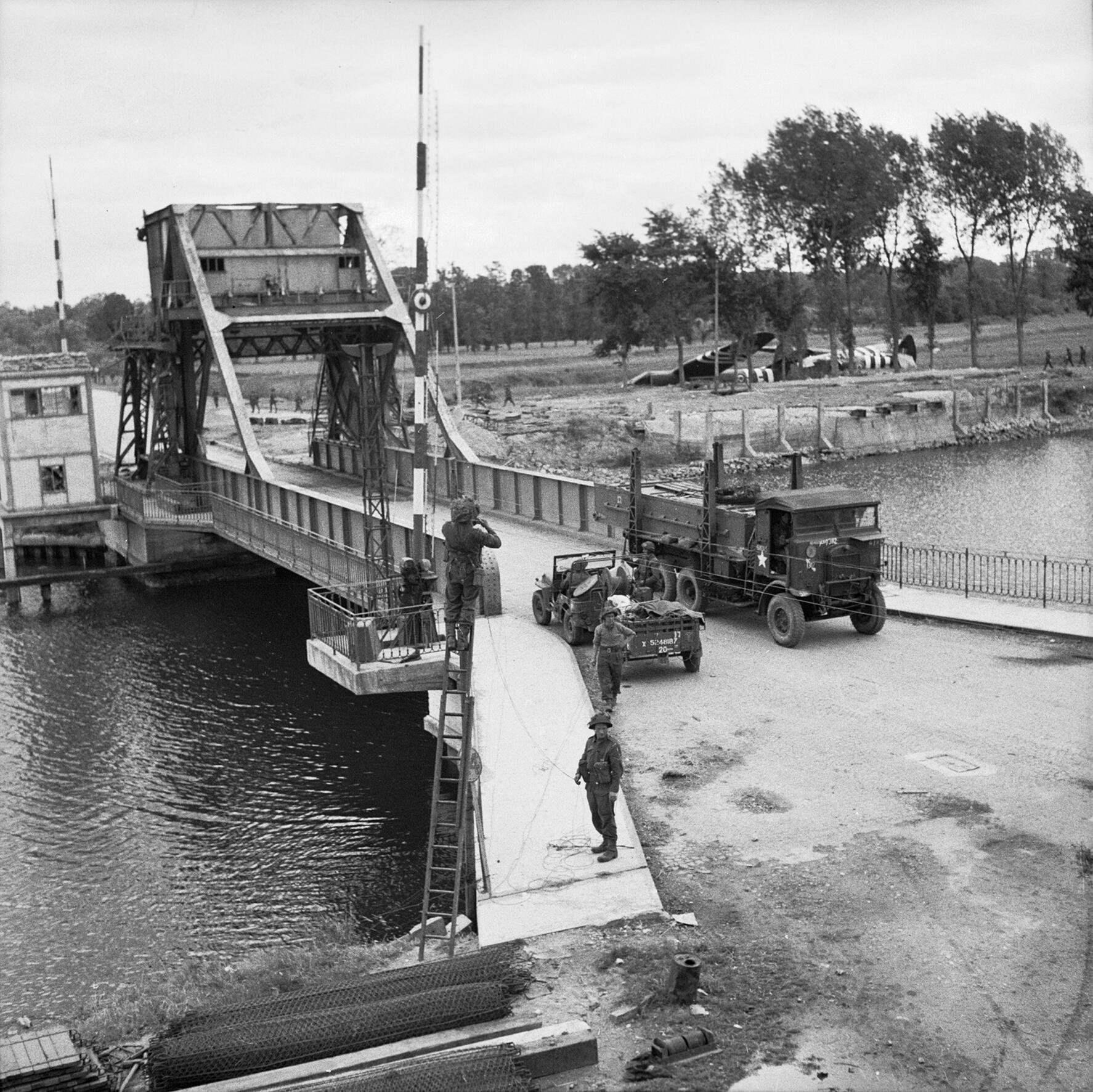
- Caen Canal bridge with Horsa gliders in the background, 9 June 1944
Date	6 June 1944
Location	Near Ranville, Normandy, France
Result	British victory

Belligerents
United Kingdom	Germany

Commanders and leaders
John Howard; Richard Coffin; Den Brotheridge † (United Kingdom) Lord Lovat	Hans Schmidt; Edgar Feuchtinger

Units involved
Ox & Bucks Light Infantry; 7th Parachute Battalion; Glider Pilot Regiment; 1st Special Service Brigade	736th Grenadier Regiment; 21st Panzer Division

Strength
180; 6 aircraft	12,400; 127 tanks 40 self-propelled artillery 2 gunboats

Casualties and losses
20 killed 50 wounded	Unknown killed Unknown wounded 14 tanks destroyed 1 gunboat sunk

The capture of the Caen Canal and Orne River bridges (wrongly known as Operation Deadstick [which in fact was a specialized glider exercise], and in official documents as Operation Coup de Main) was an operation by airborne forces of the British Army that took place in the early hours of 6 June 1944 as part of the Normandy landings of the Second World War. The objective was to capture intact two road bridges in Normandy across the River Orne and the Caen Canal, providing the only exit eastwards for British forces from their landing on Sword Beach. Intelligence reports said both bridges were heavily defended by the Germans and wired for demolition. Once captured, the bridges had to be held against any counter-attack, until the assault force was relieved by commandos and other infantry advancing from the landing beach.

The mission was vital to the success of Operation Tonga, the overall British airborne landings in Normandy. Failure to capture the bridges intact, or to prevent their demolition by the Germans, would leave the British 6th Airborne Division cut off from the rest of the Allied armies with their backs to the two waterways. If the Germans retained control over the bridges, they could be used by their armoured divisions to attack the landing beaches of Normandy.

Responsibility for the operation was assigned to the members of 'D' Company, 2nd (Airborne) Battalion, Oxfordshire and Buckinghamshire Light Infantry, part of the 6th Airlanding Brigade, 6th Airborne Division. The assault group comprised a reinforced company of six infantry platoons and an attached platoon of Royal Engineers.

The British assault group flew from the south of England to Normandy in six Airspeed Horsa gliders. The pilots of the gliders succeeded in delivering the company to its objective. After a brief exchange of fire, both bridges were captured and defended successfully against German tank, gunboat and infantry counter-attacks, until relief arrived.

== Background ==
=== British forces ===
During the planning stage of the Normandy invasion, the decision was made to land the 6th Airborne Division (Major-General Richard Gale) on the left flank of the invasion beaches between the River Orne and the River Dives. Their primary objective was to capture the two road bridges over the River Orne and the Caen Canal and prevent a German flanking attack on the landing area. Failure to capture the bridges would leave the 6th Airborne Division cut off in enemy territory, so the 5th Parachute Brigade were earmarked to defend the bridges against counter-attacks. Gale decided that the only way to capture the bridges intact was by a glider coup de main assault. He then asked Brigadier Hugh Kindersley of the 6th Airlanding Brigade to nominate his best company for the operation.

'D' Company, 2nd (Airborne) Battalion, Oxfordshire and Buckinghamshire Light Infantry (Major John Howard) and second in command Captain Brian Priday, was selected for the mission. The company had trained hard and became the fittest in the battalion, often utilizing bomb-damaged inner-city areas to practice street fighting with live ammunition. Howard expected the invasion to involve night-fighting and changed the daily routine to ensure that his men were up to the task. For weeks at a time, they rose at 20:00 and completed exercises, drills and normal paperwork throughout the night before retiring at 13:00. Gale tested the company through two exercises where the objective was to capture bridges, when it became apparent that the company would not be able to carry out the mission on its own. Asked to select two more platoons from the battalion to join them, Howard chose two from 'B' Company commanded by Lieutenants Fox and Smith. Any explosive charges found attached to the bridges were the responsibility of 30 Royal Engineers from the 249th (Airborne) Field Company, commanded by Captain Jock 'Joe' Neilson. Changes were then made to the operational plan to accommodate six platoons. Three were assigned to attack each bridge simultaneously with infantry overcoming the troops on guard duty while the engineers located and dismantled any demolition charges. For six days and nights the company carried out exercises just outside Exeter, in the south-west of England, where two bridges similar to their objectives were found over the Exeter Ship Canal.

Transport to Normandy was arranged in six Airspeed Horsa gliders, piloted by 12 NCOs from 'C' Squadron, Glider Pilot Regiment. (Note: All Glider Pilot Regiment pilots were at least of the rank of sergeant and trained soldiers.) The Horsa had a wingspan of 88 feet (27 m) and a length of 67 feet (20 m), with a maximum load of 15,750 pounds (7,140 kg) or space for two pilots, twenty-eight troops or a mixture of two jeeps, artillery guns and trailers. Pilot training involved practice landings on a small strip of land, instrument flying using stopwatches for accurate course changes and fitting flight crew goggles with dark glass to get them used to night flying. By May 1944 they had carried out 54 training sorties, flying in all weathers both day and night.

Howard was not told the exact details of the operation until 2 May, 1944. His orders were to seize the bridges over the River Orne and Caen Canal at Bénouville and Ranville intact and hold them until relieved. The relief force would initially be a company from the 7th Parachute Battalion under Howard's command. When the remainder of the parachute battalion arrived, he would hand over to their commander Lieutenant-Colonel Richard Pine-Coffin. The 3rd Infantry Division and the commandos of the 1st Commando Brigade were scheduled to land at Sword at 06:00 on the day then advance to the bridges where they were expected to arrive at 11:00.

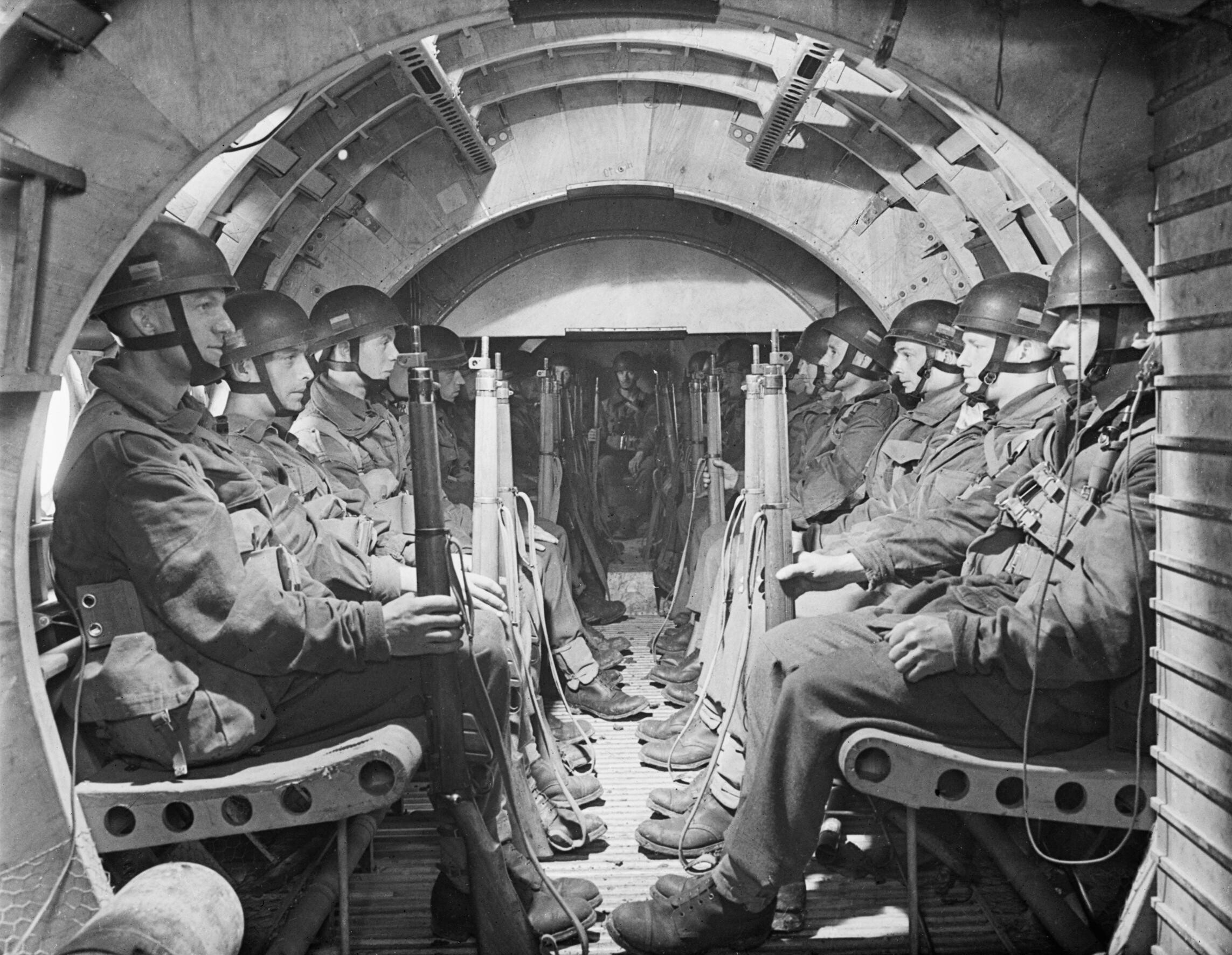
Interior of a Horsa glider, looking to the rear from the cockpit.

At the end of May 1944, 'D' Company left the battalion camp at Bulford in Wiltshire for RAF Tarrant Rushton in Dorset. The base was then secured and Howard briefed everyone on the mission, distributing photographs of the bridges and unveiling a model of the area. Glider pilot commander Staff Sergeant Jim Wallwork told Howard that with a full load of men, ammunition, assault boats and engineers' stores his gliders would be dangerously overloaded. Howard decided to only take one assault boat per glider and leave behind two men from each platoon. At the last minute, Doctor John Vaughan replaced an injured man in one of the platoons.

On 5 June 1944, the company made final preparations for the mission. Each man was issued their personal weapons and ammunition as well as up to nine hand grenades and four Bren gun magazines. Each platoon also had a 2-inch mortar and a radio. Just before the men boarded the gliders, codewords were issued. 'Ham' indicated the canal bridge was captured and 'Jam' the river bridge. Capture and destruction of the canal bridge would be signalled using the codeword 'Jack'; 'Lard' would be used if a similar fate befell the river bridge.

=== Bridges ===
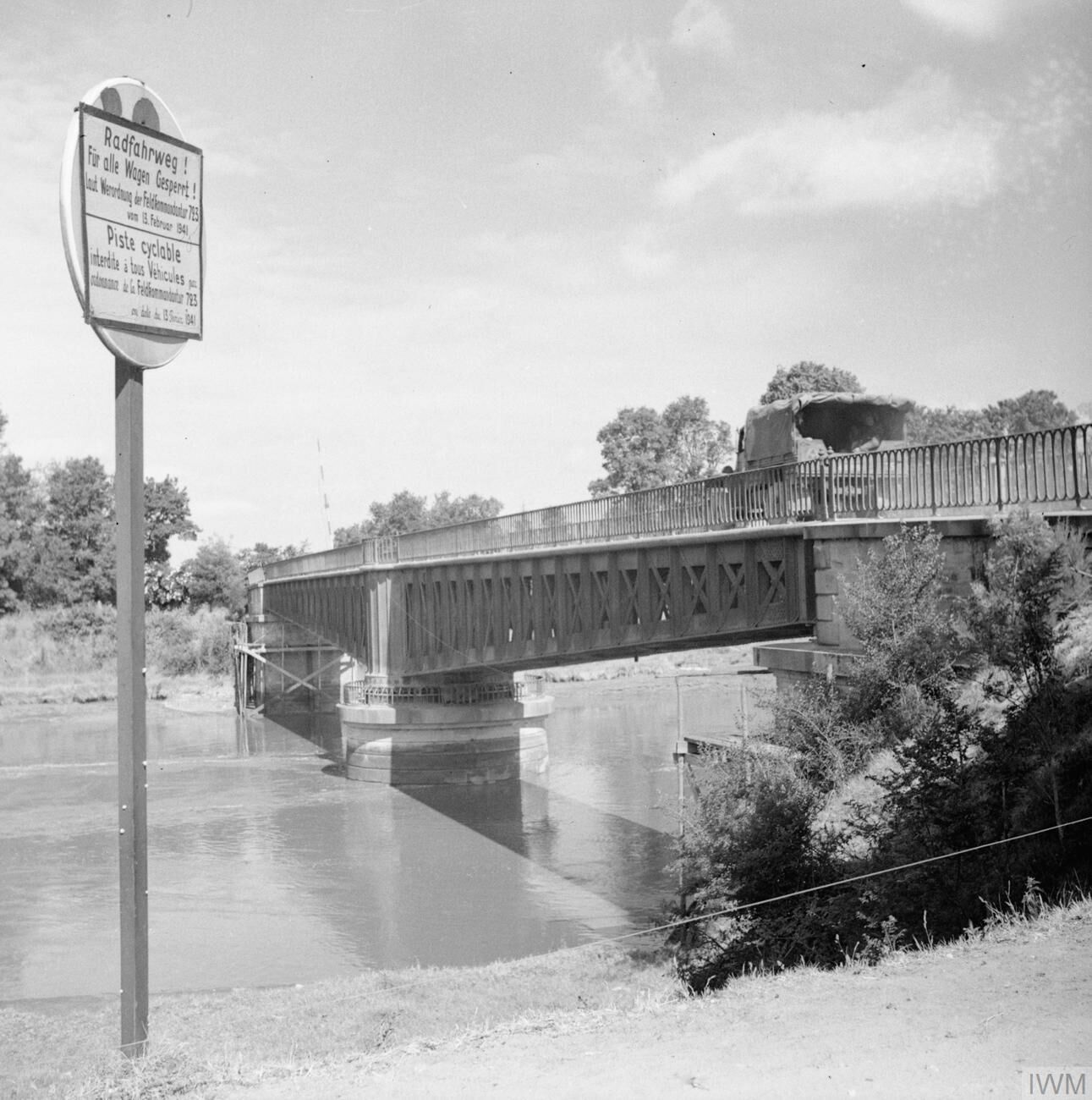
The River Orne Bridge

The Ranville bridge spans the River Orne and the Bénouville bridge crosses the Caen Canal to the west. They are 5 miles (8.0 km) from the coast and provided the only access to the city of Caen. The main road between the two communes crosses the bridges and then continues east to the River Dives. At 190 feet (58 m) long and 12 feet (3.7 m) wide, the Caen Canal bridge opens to allow canal traffic to pass underneath. The controls were housed in a nearby cabin. The canal is 27 feet (8.2 m) deep by 150 feet (46 m) wide, with earth and stone banks 6 feet (1.8 m) high. Small tarmac tracks run on both banks along the canal's entire length. Between the two bridges there is a strip of mostly marshy ground about 550 yards (500 m) wide, broken up by ditches and small streams. The Ranville bridge over the River Orne is 350 feet (110 m) long, 20 feet (6.1 m) wide and can be opened to allow river traffic to pass. The river is 160–240 feet (49–73 m) wide and with an average depth of 9 feet (2.7 m). It has mud banks averaging about 3.6 feet (1.1 m) high and a tidal rise and fall of 16–6.5 feet (4.9–2.0 m). A number of small houses lie to the west of the river, connected by a track 8–10 feet (2.4–3.0 m) wide, that runs along both banks.

=== German forces ===
The bridges were guarded by 50 men belonging to the German 736th Grenadier Regiment, 716th Infantry Division. The unit was commanded by Major Hans Schmidt and based at Ranville, 1.2 miles (1.9 km) east of the River Orne. The 716th was a static formation and had been assigned to Normandy since June 1942. The division's eight infantry battalions were deployed to defend 21 miles (34 km) of the Atlantic wall. The unit was poorly equipped with a mixture of foreign weapons and manned by conscripts from Poland, the Soviet Union, and France under a German officer and senior non-commissioned officers (NCOs). Schmidt's soldiers had orders to blow up the two bridges if they were in danger of capture.

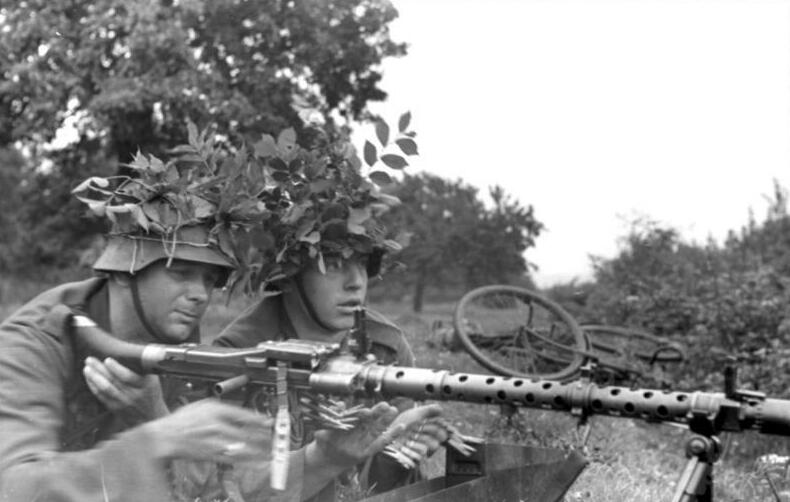
German soldiers with an MG 34 machine-gun.

A second division, the 21st Panzer, moved into the area in May 1944. One of its regiments, the 125th Panzergrenadier, commanded by Colonel Hans von Luck, was billeted at Vimont just east of Caen. There was also a battalion of the 192nd Panzergrenadier Regiment based at Cairon to the west of the bridges. Colonel von Luck trained his regiment in anti-invasion operations. He also identified likely incursion points and marked out forward routes, rest and refuelling areas and anti-aircraft gun positions. The 21st Panzer Division was a new formation based on the former Afrika Korps unit, which had been destroyed in North Africa. Although equipped with an assortment of older tanks and other armoured vehicles, the division's officers were veterans and 2,000 men from the old division filled its ranks. Further afield were the 12th SS Panzer Division at Lisieux and the Panzer Lehr Division at Chartres, both less than a day's march from the area.

Defences were in place at both bridges. On the west bank of the Caen Canal bridge there were three machine-gun emplacements and on the east bank a machine-gun and an anti-tank gun. To their north were another three machine-guns and a concrete pillbox. An anti-aircraft tower equipped with machine-guns stood to the south. At the River Orne bridge, the eastern bank south of the bridge had a pillbox with anti-tank and anti-aircraft guns. To the north of the bridge were two machine-guns. Both bridges had sandbagged trench systems along the banks. However, the presence of German machineguns near the canal bridge was categorically denied by Helmut Roemer and Erwin Sauer, in: HK.von Keusgen, Pegasus-Bruecke und Batterie Mrville (014)

== The operation ==
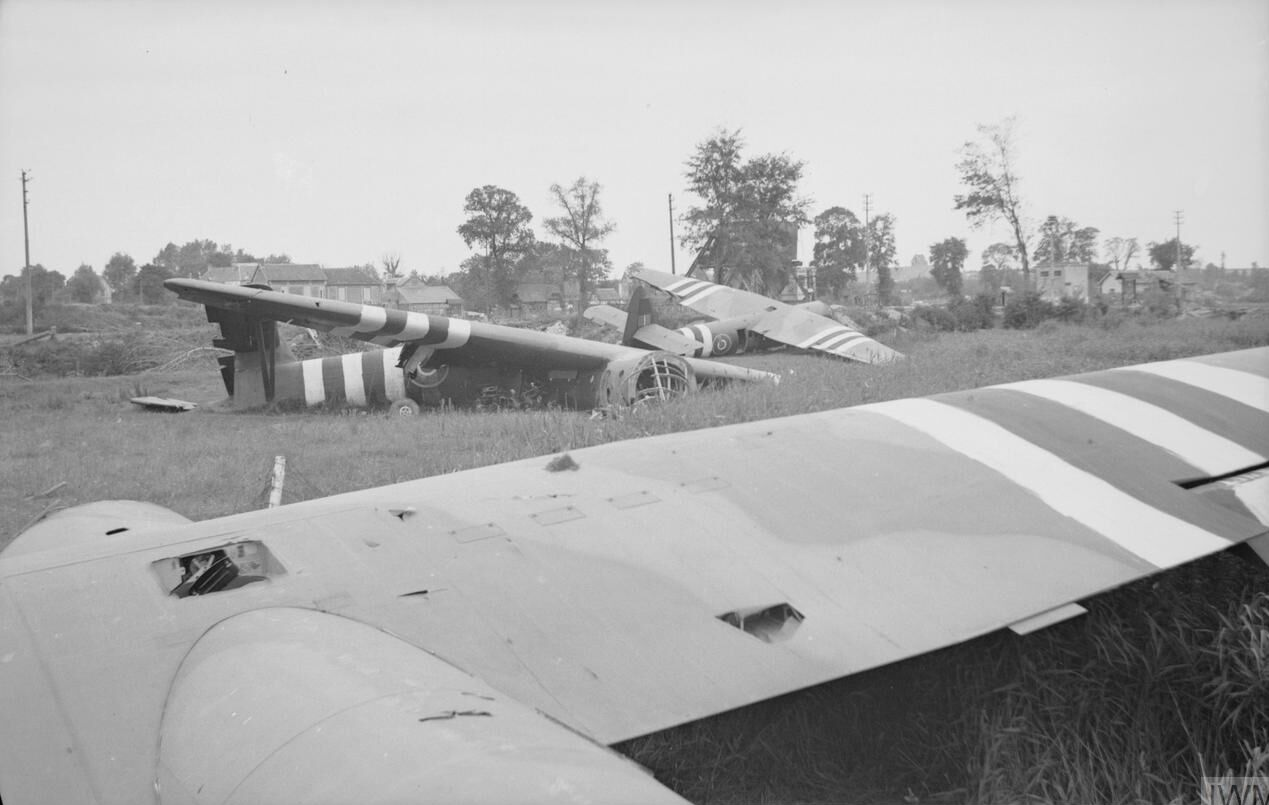
The three Caen Canal gliders; the bridge is hidden by the trees in the distance.

=== Flight and landings ===
At 22:56 on 5 June, 1944, the six gliders towed by Halifax bombers took off from RAF Tarrant Rushton. Horsa number one, the first of the three headed for the Caen Canal, carried Howard with Lieutenant Den Brotheridge's platoon, number two bore Lieutenant David Wood's platoon, and number three carried Lieutenant Smith's platoon. Priday with Lieutenant Hooper's platoon made for the river bridge aboard number four. Horsa number six carrying Lieutenant Fox's platoon was followed by number five bearing Tod Sweeney's platoon. Each glider also carried five Royal Engineers.

Flying over the English Channel at 7,000 feet (2,100 m), the bombers crossed the Normandy coast at 00:07 on 6 June, 1944 and released their towed gliders. With Wallwork at the controls, the number one glider crashed into the barbed wire surrounding the canal bridge defences at 00:16. The other two gliders followed at one-minute intervals. The number two glider broke in half and came to halt at the edge of a large pond. One of the men, Lance-Corporal Fred Greenhalgh, was knocked unconscious following the crash landing and thrown out of his glider and died by drowning, becoming the first casualty of the operation. Brotheridge and Smith's platoons headed for the bridge, while Wood's platoon moved towards the trenches on its north east side.

=== Capture of the bridges ===
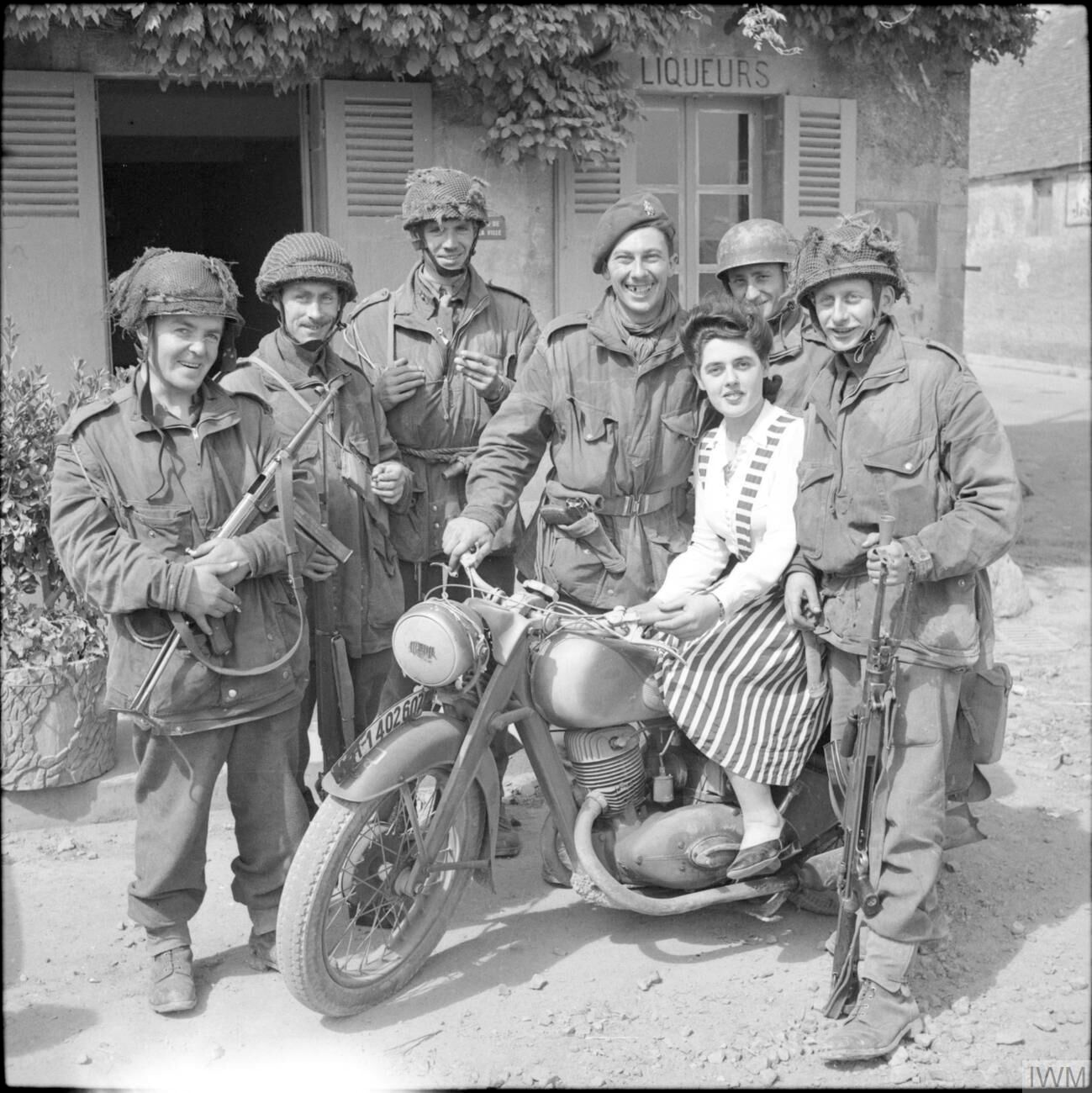
Glider troops and a French civilian. The man on the left, Private Musty, is armed with a German MP 40.

The Germans knew the invasion was imminent if not the exact location; Major Schmidt, in command of the bridges, had been told that they were one of the most critical points in Normandy. The defenders however were not on full alert and only two sentries were on duty when the gliders landed. The sound of a gunshot alerted the two sentries on the canal bridge. As Brotheridge's platoon attacked, one ran off shouting "paratroops" while the second fired a flare gun to alert nearby defenders. Brotheridge shot him while other members of his platoon cleared the trenches and pillbox with grenades. Alerted by the flare, the German machine gunners opened fire at the men on the bridge, wounding Brotheridge as he threw a grenade. The grenade silenced one of the machine gun positions and another was taken out by Bren gun fire.

1st Platoon crossed the bridge to take up a defensive position on the west bank. The Royal Engineers from number one glider searched for explosive charges and cut the fuse wires when they found any. Smith's platoon crossed the bridge next, exchanging fire with the German defenders, whereupon Smith was wounded by a grenade. Using grenades and sub-machine gun fire, the platoons cleared the trenches and bunkers. By 00:21 German resistance on the west bank of the canal bridge was over. Checking the area, the men of Brotheridge's platoon now realised that their leader was wounded. He soon died of his wounds, becoming the first Allied soldier killed by enemy action during the invasion. On the east bank, Wood's platoon cleared the trenches and bunkers with little opposition. Wood was hit in the leg by machine-gun fire as he ordered the platoon to storm the German defences. All three platoon commanders at the canal bridge were now either dead or wounded. Around the same time, pathfinders from the 22nd Independent Parachute Company landed in the area between the River Orne and the River Dives. (Note: Stephen Ambrose writes it was 00:19. However, Ken Ford and Steven Zaloga write that the pathfinders landed at 00:15 before 'D' Company. The British Ministry of Defence document that the bridges had been seized when the pathfinders were dropped at 00:20.) Brigadier Nigel Poett, commanding the 5th Parachute Brigade, along with a small team accompanied the pathfinders. Disoriented after landing, Poett heard Brotheridge's Sten gun and set off for the bridges with the only man he could locate. Unteroffizier Weber, the only German to escape 'D' Company's attack, retreated to Bénouville and reported the bridge had been captured.

Fox's glider (number six) was the first to land 330 yards (300 m) from the river bridge at 00:20, while glider number four was reported missing. When the Germans opened fire with an MG 34, the platoon responded with a 2-inch (51 mm) mortar and destroyed the gun with a direct hit. They then crossed the bridge without further opposition. At 00:21, glider number five landed 770 yards (700 m) short of the bridge. Sweeney left one of his sections on the west bank then moved the rest of the platoon across the bridge to take up defensive positions on the east bank.

From his newly established command post, in the trenches on the eastern bank of the canal near the bridge, Howard learned that the river bridge had also been taken. Captain Neilson of the engineers reported that although the bridges had been prepared for demolition, the explosives had not been attached. (Note: The bridges had been prepared for demolition with the explosive charges stored nearby, and were to be fitted only when ordered by the High Command.) Howard ordered his signalman to transmit the code words 'Ham' and 'Jam' then brought Fox's platoon across the canal bridge, positioning them at the Bénouville to Le Port crossroads as the company's forward platoon.

=== Arrival of 7th Parachute Battalion ===
At 00:50, aircraft carrying the rest of the 6th Airborne Division appeared overhead and the paratroopers descended onto drop zones marked out by the pathfinders. Howard began blowing the morse code letter 'V' on his whistle, to help guide the 7th Parachute Battalion to the bridges. The first paratroops to arrive, at 00:52, were Brigadier Poett and the soldier he had picked up en route. Briefed by Howard on the situation, they heard tanks and lorries moving around in Bénouville and Le Port. On the drop zone, only about 100 men of the 7th Parachute Battalion had made it to the rallying point but all their signal equipment, machine guns and mortars were missing. Pine-Coffin, aware that his battalion was the only unit allocated defensive positions west of the bridges, decided they could not wait any longer and, at 01:10, left for the bridges.

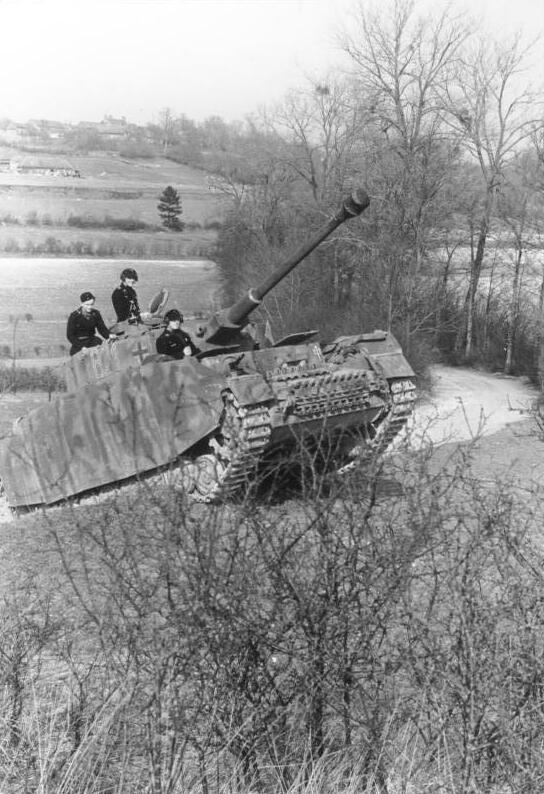
Panzer IV similar to the one destroyed at the Caen Canal Bridge.

At about the same time, Major Schmidt decided he needed to see for himself what was happening at the bridges. He headed for the bridge in his Sd.Kfz. 250 halftrack with a motorcycle escort. Travelling at high speed they unknowingly passed the forward line of 'D' Company's defence and drove onto the bridge whereupon the British company opened fire. The soldier aboard the motorcycle was killed and the halftrack was forced off the road. Schmidt and his driver were taken prisoner.

The commander of the 716th Infantry Division, Generalleutnant Wilhelm Richter, was informed at 01:20 of the parachute landings and that the bridges had been captured intact. One of his first actions was to contact Generalmajor Edgar Feuchtinger of 21st Panzer Division. Richter ordered the division to attack the landing areas. While Feuchtinger's tanks were delegated to support the 716th, it was also part of the German armoured reserve that could not move without orders from the German High Command. All German panzer formations could only be moved on the direct orders of Adolf Hitler, who was sleeping at the time and his staff refused to wake him. When the 125th Panzergrenadier Regiment received news of the airborne landings at 01:30, Luck ordered the regiment to their assembly areas north and east of Caen and to wait for further orders.

The closest large German unit to the canal bridge was the 2nd Battalion, 192nd Panzergrenadier Regiment based at Cairon. General Feuchtinger ordered them to recapture the bridges, and then attack the parachute landing zones further west. At 02:00, the 2nd Battalion headed for the bridges from the west, supported by the 1st Panzerjager Company and part of the 989th Heavy Artillery Battalion coming from the north. As the first Panzer IVs from the north reached the junction leading to the bridge, the leading vehicle was hit by a round from 'D' Company's only serviceable PIAT anti-tank weapon. The vehicle exploded, setting off its stowed ammunition, and the other tanks withdrew. (Note: Ambrose writes the vehicle was a Panzer IV, whereas Will Fowler stated some troops thought it was a French Char B1. Anthony Hall wrote it was a Panzer IV belonging to the 716th Infantry Division, and Simon Fraser, 15th Lord Lovat (the commander of the 1st Commando Brigade) said it was a half-track.)

The first company of the 7th Parachute Battalion, commanded by Major Nigel Taylor, arrived at the bridges. Howard directed them to defensive positions west of the canal in Bénouville and Le Port. When Pine-Coffin arrived at the bridges, he was briefed by Howard, and crossed into Bénouville and set up his headquarters beside the church. Pine-Coffin had about 200 men in his three companies. He positioned 'A' and 'C' Companies in Bénouville facing south towards Caen and 'B' Company in Le Port facing Ouistreham. 'D' Company was now pulled back into the area between the two bridges and held in reserve. A further sweep of the trenches and bunkers was conducted, and resulted in the capture of a number of Germans.

At 03:00, the 8th Heavy Company, 192nd Panzergrenadier Regiment with 75 mm SP guns, 20 mm AA guns, and mortars attacked 'A' and 'C' Companies, 7th Parachute Battalion, from the south. The paratroops were forced back and the Germans established their own positions in Bénouville, but were unable to break the British line. They dug in and waited for tank support before moving forward again. The Germans fired mortar bombs and machine guns at the paratroopers and attempted small assaults on their positions throughout the night.

Just before dawn, Howard summoned his platoon commanders to a meeting. With their senior officers dead or wounded, 1, 2 and 3 Platoons were now commanded by corporals. Howard's second in command, Captain Priday and 4 Platoon were missing. Only Lieutenants Fox and Sweeney of 5 and 6 Platoons respectively had a full complement of officers and NCOs. The landings at Sword began at 07:00, preceded by a heavy naval bombardment. At the bridges, daylight allowed German snipers to identify targets and anyone moving in the open was in danger of being shot. The men of 1 Platoon who had taken over the 75 mm anti-tank gun on the east bank of the canal used it to engage possible sniper positions in Bénouville, the Château de Bénouville and the surrounding area. At 09:00, two German gunboats (the Otto Bröhan and the Friedrich Busse) approached the canal bridge from Ouistreham. The lead boat fired its 20 mm gun and 2 Platoon returned fire with a PIAT, hitting the wheelhouse of the leading boat, which crashed into the canal bank. The second boat retreated to Ouistreham. A lone German aircraft bombed the canal bridge at 10:00, dropping one bomb. The bomb struck the bridge but failed to detonate.

=== Afternoon fighting and link up with Sword Beach ===
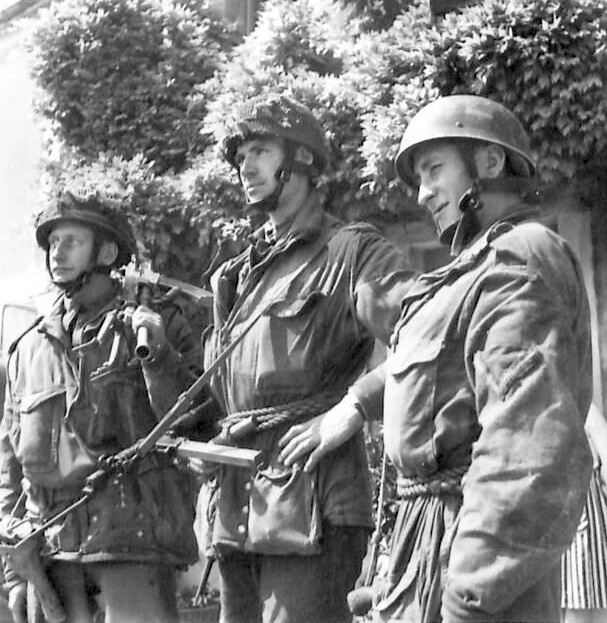
Captain Priday (centre, holding a Sten Mk V) and men from the missing glider.

The German 2nd Battalion, 192nd Panzergrenadier Regiment continued to attack Bénouville and Le Port, assisted by their tanks, mortars and infantry. The attack caused serious problems for the understrength 7th Parachute Battalion, until the leading tank was blown up with a Gammon bomb, blocking the road. During the attack, 13 of the 17 tanks trying to get through to the bridge were destroyed. The paratroopers were then reinforced by 1 Platoon from 'D' Company. The platoon moved forward into Bénouville and cleared the Germans in house to house fighting. 5 and 6 Platoons also moved into positions opposite the Gondrée Café, on the west bank of the canal. By midday, most of the missing men from the 7th Parachute Battalion had arrived at the bridges and the three glider platoons were moved back to their original positions.

Just after midday, the 21st Panzer Division received permission to attack the landings. Luck ordered the 125th Panzergrenadier Regiment, east of the River Orne, towards the bridges. The column was quickly spotted, and engaged for the next two hours by Allied artillery and aircraft causing heavy losses. The 1st Battalion, 192nd Panzergrenadier Regiment and the 100th Panzer Regiment, attacking from west of the canal, had more success reaching the beaches between the British landing area of Sword and the Canadian Juno. At 13:30, the men at the bridges heard the sound of bagpipes, played by Bill Millin of No. 4 Commando, 1st Special Service Brigade. As the commandos arrived, they crossed the bridges and joined the rest of 6th Airborne Division defending the eastern perimeter. Some of the tanks accompanying the commandos moved into Bénouville to reinforce its defences, while others crossed the bridges with the commandos. At 15:00, a boat loaded with German infantry approached from Caen. It was engaged with the anti-tank gun manned by 1 Platoon, hit in the stern by the second round fired and then retreated back toward Caen.

At 21:15, the 2nd Battalion, Royal Warwickshire Regiment of the 185th Infantry Brigade arrived from Sword and began taking over the bridges' defences. At around midnight, Howard handed over command of the bridges to the Warwickshire Regiment and his company left to join the rest of their battalion at Ranville. At 03:30, they finally located the battalion's positions and found Captain Priday and 4 Platoon had already joined the battalion. The platoon had landed beside the River Dives, at Varaville about 8 miles (13 km) away, and had spent the previous day fighting their way towards the bridges trying to rejoin the company.

== Aftermath ==
Bénouville was the farthest forward point of the British advance on 6 June 1944. On 9 June, the German Air Force attacked the bridges with 13 aircraft. The British had positioned light and medium-sized anti-aircraft guns around the bridges and in the face of intense anti-aircraft fire the attack failed, although they did claim one of the bridges was destroyed by a direct hit.

The bridgehead, captured by the 6th Airborne Division, was the subsequent launching point for a number of following operations. I Corps conducted the eastern pincer of Operation Perch out of the bridgehead, but were halted by the 21st Panzer Division. A later operation, Dreadnought, was planned but cancelled; it intended for VIII Corps to use the bridgehead as a basis for an outflanking attack on Caen. Finally, Operations Atlantic and Goodwood attacked out of the bridgehead liberating the remaining sectors of Caen and ending the Battle for Caen.

Following the operation, the engineers, glider pilots and 'B' Company men were returned to their parent formations. 'D' Company played their part in the 6th Airborne Division's defence of the Orne bridgehead, and advance to the River Seine. On 5 September, when the division was withdrawn to England, all that remained of the company were 40 men under the only remaining officer, Howard; the other officers, sergeants, and most of the junior NCOs having been among the casualties.

The glider pilots were the first group to leave 'D' Company, their expertise being required for other planned operations. In particular Operation Comet, which included another coup-de-main operation where eighteen gliders would be used to capture three bridges in the Netherlands. The mission would be carried out by the 1st Airborne Division with a brigade allocated to defend each bridge. Comet was scheduled for the 8 September 1944, but was delayed and then cancelled. The plans were adapted, and became Operation Market Garden. This operation would involve three airborne divisions, however the coup-de-main assault plans were not carried out.

=== Analysis ===
Air Chief Marshal Trafford Leigh-Mallory, of the Royal Air Force, praised the pilots involved saying the operation included the "most outstanding flying achievements of the war".

=== Casualties ===
Of the 181 men (139 infantry, 30 engineers and 12 pilots) of 'D' Company involved in the capture of the bridges, two were killed and an additional fourteen wounded. The 7th Battalion's losses during the defence of the bridges amounted to 18 dead and 36 wounded.

The total German losses, in the area, during 6 June are unknown. Fourteen tanks were lost during the fighting; the first during the night, and the remaining 13 throughout the day. Other losses include one gunboat on the Caen canal.

=== Awards ===
Howard was awarded the Distinguished Service Order, presented in the field by General Bernard Montgomery. Both Smith and Sweeney were awarded the Military Cross; the Military Medal was awarded to Sergeant Thornton and Lance-Corporal Stacey; Lieutenant Brotheridge was posthumously mentioned in dispatches. In recognition of their feat of flying, eight of the glider pilots were awarded the Distinguished Flying Medal.

== Legacy ==
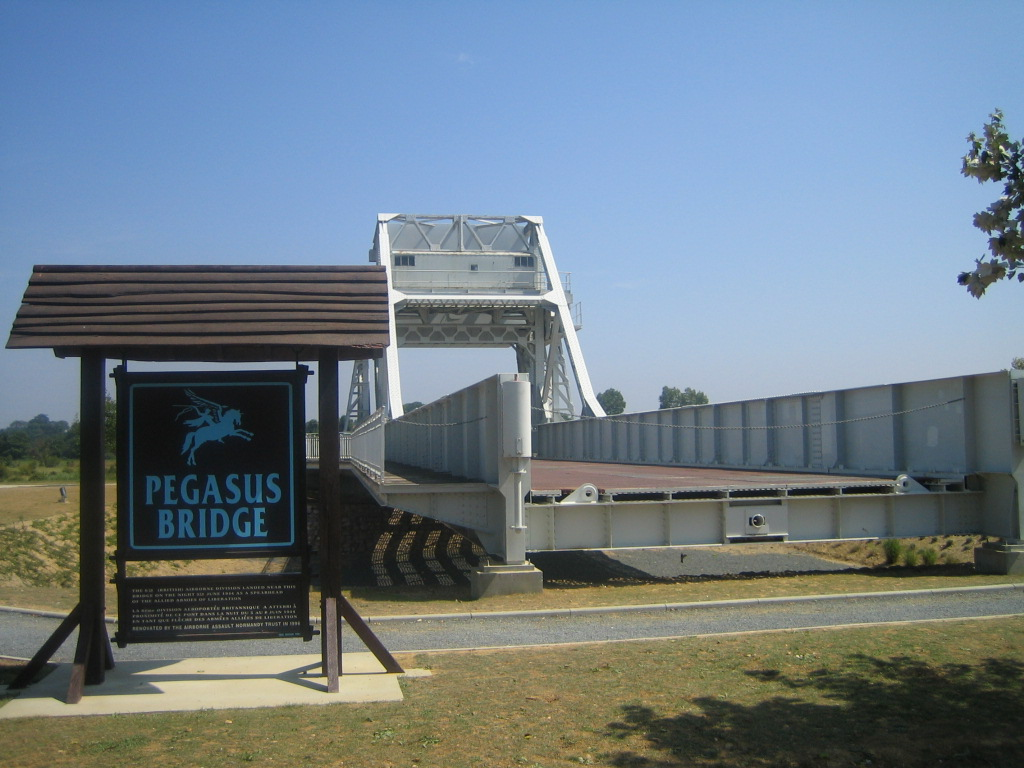
The original Pegasus Bridge at the Memorial Pegasus in Benouville.

The Caen Canal bridge was renamed Pegasus Bridge after the emblem of the British airborne forces, while the River Orne bridge became Horsa Bridge. The road across them is now the "Esplanade Major John Howard". Since the end of the war, Pegasus Bridge and the adjacent Café Gondrée have become a place where British veterans of the conflict visiting Normandy congregate. In 1994, Pegasus Bridge was replaced by a new structure and the old bridge was added to the displays at the Pegasus Museum in Benouville.

The original model of the area around the bridge, that was used to brief troops taking part in the assault, is preserved in Airborne Assault: The Museum of The Parachute Regiment and Airborne Forces, located at the Imperial War Museum Duxford.
