= Den Brotheridge =

British Army officer (1915–1944)

- Born: 8 December 1915; Smethwick, Staffordshire; England, United Kingdom
- Died: 6 June 1944 (aged 28) near Ranville, France
- Burial place: Ranville Churchyard
- Military career
- Allegiance: United Kingdom
- Branch: British Army
- Service years: 1942–1944
- Rank: Lieutenant
- Service number: 237676
- Unit: Oxfordshire and Buckinghamshire Light Infantry
- Conflicts: Second World War: Western Front; Western Allied invasion of France; Normandy landings; Operation Tonga; Capture of the Caen canal and Orne river bridges (DOW)
- Awards: Mentioned in dispatches

Lieutenant Herbert Denham Brotheridge (8 December 1915 – 6 June 1944) was a British Army officer who served with the 2nd Battalion, Oxfordshire and Buckinghamshire Light Infantry (the 52nd) during the Second World War. He is often considered to be the first Allied soldier to be killed in action on D-Day, 6 June 1944. He was killed during Operation Tonga: the British airborne landings which secured the left flank of the invasion area before the main assault on the Normandy beaches began.

== Early life and family ==
Den Brotheridge was born in Smethwick, Staffordshire, the son of Herbert Charles and Lilian Brotheridge. He was educated at Smethwick Technical College and played football for the Aston Villa Colts and cricket for Mitchells and Butlers, Smethwick. He became an inspector of weights and measures with Aylesbury Borough Council. He married Margaret Plant on 30 August 1940 who was eight months pregnant when he left for Normandy. His daughter Margaret Brotheridge was born two weeks after he was killed.

== Military service and commemoration ==
On 4 July 1942, Brotheridge was commissioned into the Oxfordshire and Buckinghamshire Light Infantry, British Army, as a second lieutenant. He was chosen to command 25 Platoon (also known as first platoon) in Major John Howard's 'D' Company, 2nd Oxfordshire and Buckinghamshire Light Infantry, 6th Airlanding Brigade, 6th Airborne Division. The original plan was for Lieutenant David Wood to lead the first platoon across the Caen canal bridge, however shortly before D-Day Howard changed the order of landing and Brotheridge was selected to lead the first platoon across the bridge at Benouville.

The first coup de main glider-borne platoon left RAF Tarrant Rushton, Dorset, at 22:56 on 5 June 1944 on a moonlit night, initially flying 70 mi (110 km) eastwards and crossing the English coast over Worthing, Sussex. Brotheridge's platoon's glider piloted by Staff Sergeant Jim Wallwork landed in Normandy at 00:16 on 6 June less than 50 ft (15 m) from the water tower of the Benouville Bridge. Brotheridge led the first charge across the bridge, now known as Pegasus Bridge.

He managed to silence the left German machine-gun post at the western bank of the Caen Canal; he and his platoon then came under attack by machine gun fire from the direction of the Gondree Cafe on the far side of the canal. Brotheridge was hit in the back of the neck by the machine gun fire and died of wounds without regaining consciousness in the early hours of 6 June, aged 28, in a Casualty Collection Post situated in a trench between the Caen Canal and Orne bridges, where Captain John Vaughan RAMC took care of him. Lt. Herbert Denham Brotheridge is buried in the War Cemetery in Ranville Churchyard, near Caen, in France.

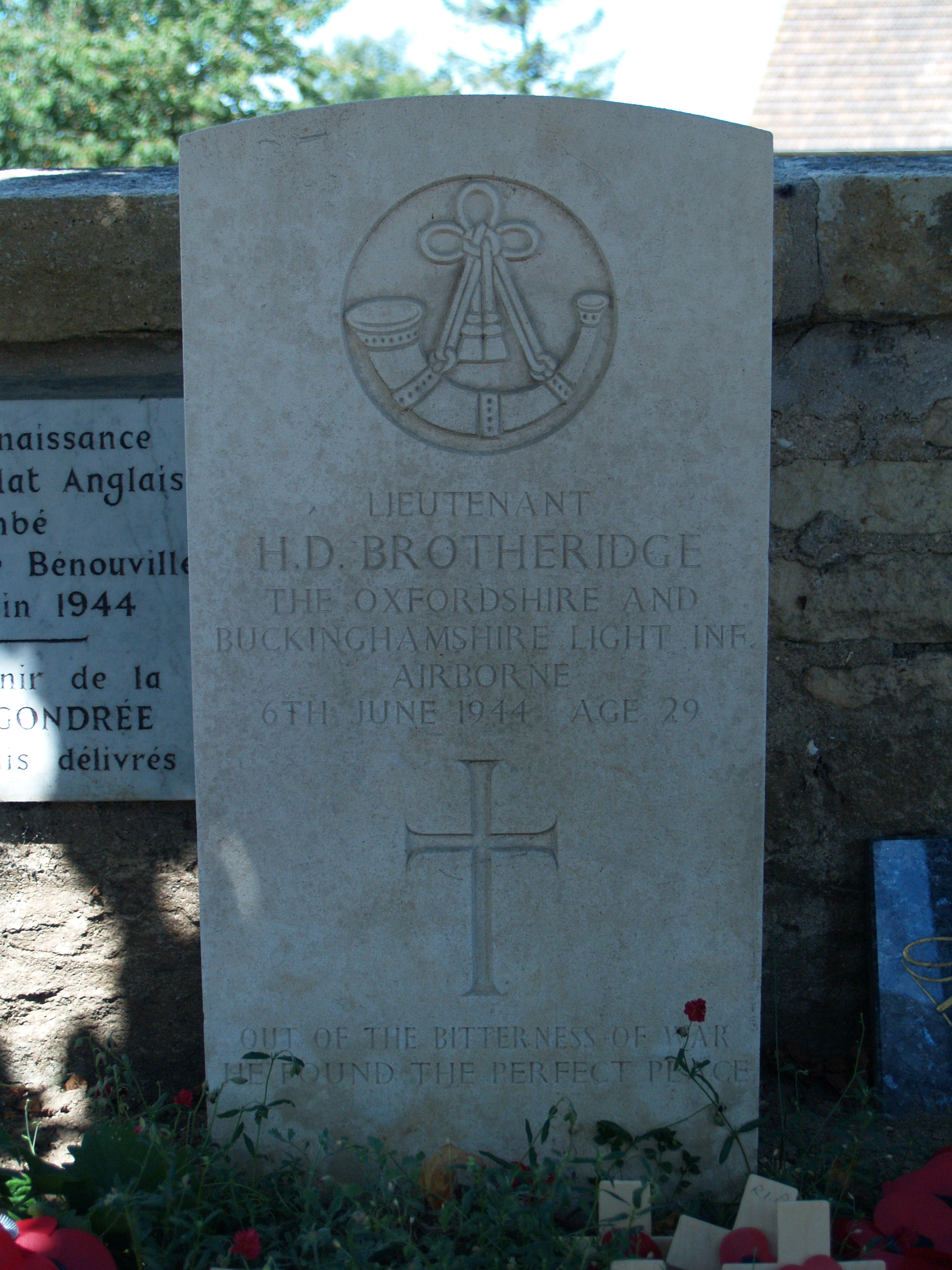
Brotheridge's gravestone at Ranville Churchyard

He received a mention in despatches "in recognition of gallant and distinguished services in Normandy". He had been granted an immediate award of the Military Cross by Field Marshal Montgomery the C-in-C of 21st Army Group on 16 June 1944, however regulations for the award of the MC at that time prevented confirmation of the award by King George VI as the citation had not been initiated until after Brotheridge's death.

Another member of the coup de main platoon was killed during the operation. Lance-Corporal Fred Greenhalgh of No 14 platoon, 2nd Ox and Bucks, was knocked unconscious following the crash landing and thrown out of his glider and died by drowning.

Major John Howard's D Company 2nd Ox and Bucks (the 52nd) was the first Allied unit to land in Normandy on D-Day, 6 June 1944 and Brotheridge was the first soldier from the glider-borne 2nd Ox and Bucks coup de main operation to be killed in action. Brotheridge was the first man to be wounded in action during the Normandy landings and is widely recognised as being the first Allied soldier to be killed by enemy action on D-Day, 6 June 1944.

A memorial plaque, intended to commemorate Brotheridge's life and the circumstances of his death, was unveiled at Smethwick Council House on 2 April 1995 by his daughter, Margaret Brotheridge.

== Sources ==
- Edwards, Denis (1999). The Devils Own Luck Pegasus Bridge to the Baltic 1944-45. Barnsley: Pen & Sword Military. ISBN 978-0850528695.
- Howard, John; Bates, Penny (2006). The Pegasus Diaries: The Private Papers of Major John Howard DSO. Barnsley: Pen & Sword Military. ISBN 978-1844158829.
