= Sandy Smith (British Army officer) =

British army officer (1922–1993)

- Born: Richard Arthur Amyas Smith; 4 March 1922; Karachi, India
- Died: 27 April 1993 (aged 71); Cheltenham, Gloucestershire
- Military career
- Allegiance: United Kingdom
- Branch: Oxfordshire and Buckinghamshire Light Infantry
- Service years: 1943–1946
- Rank: Major
- Nickname: Sandy
- Service number: 228638
- Conflicts: Second World War
- Awards: Military Cross

Major Richard Arthur Amyas Smith MC (4 March 1922 – 27 April 1993) was a British Army officer who served during the Second World War. He was awarded a Military Cross for gallantry and leadership whilst serving as a platoon commander in the gliderborne 2nd Oxfordshire and Buckinghamshire Light Infantry (the 52nd) coup de main operation; tasked to capture Pegasus Bridge and Horsa Bridge during the opening minutes of D-Day, 6 June 1944. The capture of both bridges was considered to be critical to securing the left flank of the Normandy landings area.

== Early life ==
Smith was born in Karachi, India. He was educated at Tonbridge School and St John's College, Cambridge University where he took a degree in History. He represented the Public Schools at Lord's Cricket Ground before the outbreak of the Second World War and had the highest scoring rate of any Public School batsman. He later represented Cambridge University at Rugby. Smith was commissioned into the Oxfordshire and Buckinghamshire Light Infantry in March 1943. He was posted to the 2nd Ox and Bucks (the 52nd) and placed in command of No 14 platoon B Company. The 2nd Ox and Bucks formed part of 6th Airlanding Brigade, 6th Airborne Division.

== Pegasus Bridge ==
Smith and his platoon were attached to Major John Howard's D Company 2nd Ox and Bucks who were to lead the gliderborne coup de main operation on D-Day to capture Benouville bridge over the Caen canal, now known as Pegasus Bridge and Ranville bridge over the River Orne, now known as Horsa Bridge. Smith's platoon was one of three platoons tasked to capture Pegasus Bridge before the main assault on the Normandy beaches began.

On D-Day, 6 June 1944, Smith's platoon was in the 3rd Glider to land at Pegasus Bridge, landing at 00.18hrs. He received a knee injury on landing however he and his No 3 platoon crossed the bridge and established defensive positions to reinforce Lieutenant Den Brotheridge's No 1 Platoon. He was wounded in the wrist by a grenade and after Brotheridge had been killed he also took over command of No 1 platoon on the Western side of the bridge. After the bridge had been secured he agreed to be moved to a First Aid post in Ranville. He was awarded a Military Cross for his gallantry and leadership whilst injured. The operation to capture both bridges was portrayed in the 1962 film The Longest Day.

== North-West Europe 1944-45 ==
He served with 2nd Ox and Bucks in the Ardennes and the Netherlands from December 1944 to February 1945. He took part in Operation Varsity: the air assault landing over the River Rhine on 24 March 1945 and in the advance across Germany to the Baltic port of Wismar. Smith commanded the 2nd Ox and Bucks guard of honour for the meeting between Field Marshal Montgomery and Marshal Rokossovsky at Wismar on 7 May 1945.

== Post-war ==
Following the Second World War he served in Palestine before being demobilised from the Army in 1946. Smith pursued a business career and became a director of both Shell and BP in India. He lived in Chedworth, Gloucestershire.
