= David Wood (British Army officer) =

British Army officer (1923–2009)

- Born: 23 February 1923; Corsham, Wiltshire, England
- Died: 12 March 2009 (aged 86); Devonshire, England
- Military career
- Allegiance: United Kingdom
- Branch: British Army
- Service years: 1941−1978
- Rank: Colonel
- Service number: 228639
- Units: Royal Fusiliers; Oxfordshire and Buckinghamshire Light Infantry
- Conflicts: World War II
- Awards: Member of the Order of the British Empire; Mentioned in dispatches

Colonel David James Wood MBE (23 February 1923 – 12 March 2009) was the last surviving officer of the coup de main operation carried out by glider borne troops of the 2nd Oxfordshire and Buckinghamshire Light Infantry (the 52nd), on D Day, 6 June 1944, tasked with capturing Pegasus Bridge and Horsa Bridge before the main assault on the Normandy beaches began.

== Early life and Second World War ==
David James Wood was born in Corsham, Wiltshire, and educated at Monkton Combe School. He was commissioned to the Oxfordshire and Buckinghamshire Light Infantry and joined the 2nd (airlanding) Battalion (the 52nd) in 1942. The battalion formed part of 6th Airlanding Brigade, 6th Airborne Division in 1943.

=== Pegasus Bridge ===
Wood was a D Company platoon commander in the coup de main operation on D Day led by Major John Howard. The objective was to seize Benouville Bridge, now known as Pegasus Bridge, over the Caen canal and Ranville Bridge, now known as Horsa Bridge, over the River Orne. The original plan was for Wood to lead the first platoon across the bridge at Benouville; however, shortly before D Day, Howard changed the order of landing and Lieutenant Den Brotheridge was selected to lead the first platoon across Pegasus Bridge. On D Day, Wood and his No 24 platoon were in the second glider to land at Pegasus Bridge, touching down at 00.17 hours, one minute after the first glider. Wood's platoon's objective was to clear trenches, machine-gun nests and the anti-tank gun pit along the east bank of Pegasus Bridge. By 00.26 hours on D Day both bridges had been secured. Along with his 'Batman' Pvt Albert Chatfield he was shot in the leg by a burst from a Machine Pistol whilst leading his platoon. He was evacuated to a divisional aid post in Ranville and eventually back to England.

The capture of the bridges was portrayed in the film The Longest Day (1962).

== Post World War II ==
Following the Second World War, Wood served in Greece, the Suez Canal Zone, BAOR, Cyprus, Malaya, Northern Ireland, and Aden. Wood was second-in-command of the 1st Green Jackets (43rd and 52nd) in Penang, during the insurgency in Brunei and the Confrontation with Indonesia. He was mentioned in despatches in Brunei, 1962. He was Military Assistant to the C-in-C British Army of the Rhine and was appointed Member of the Order of the British Empire (MBE).

The Oxfordshire and Buckinghamshire Light Infantry became the 1st Green Jackets (43rd and 52nd) on 7 November 1958 and the 1st Battalion The Royal Green Jackets on 1 January 1966.

Wood retired from the Army in 1978.

== Later life ==
Wood became President of the Exeter branch of the Normandy Veterans' Association. In June 2004, at the 60th anniversary of the Normandy landings, he was awarded the French Legion d' honneur, the highest order of France. He lived in Cullompton, Devon.

He married Alice Bindloss in 1969, a former officer of the Queen Alexandra's Royal Army Nursing Corps.

Wood died in March 2009 aged 86.

== Bibliography ==
- Ambrose, Stephen. (1984). Pegasus Bridge - D-Day: The Daring British Airborne Raid. Simon & Schuster: London. ISBN 0-7434-5068-X.
- Howard, John and Bates, Penny. (2006). The Pegasus Diaries: The Private Papers of Major John Howard, DSO. Pen & Sword Books. ISBN 978-1-84415-446-3.
- Ryan, Cornelius. (1959). The Longest Day. Simon & Schuster: London.
- Colonel David Wood: Pegasus bridge D-Day veteran, The Times, 27 March 2009. Retrieved on 30 March 2009.
- Massy-Beresford, Michael (2007). Gliderborne: The story of the 2nd Battalion, The Oxfordshire and Buckinghamshire Light Infantry (the 52nd) in World War II.
- Barber, Neil. (2009). The Pegasus and Orne Bridges.
