= Memorial Pegasus =

Museum in Ranville, France

Coordinates: 49.2423°N 0.2717°W

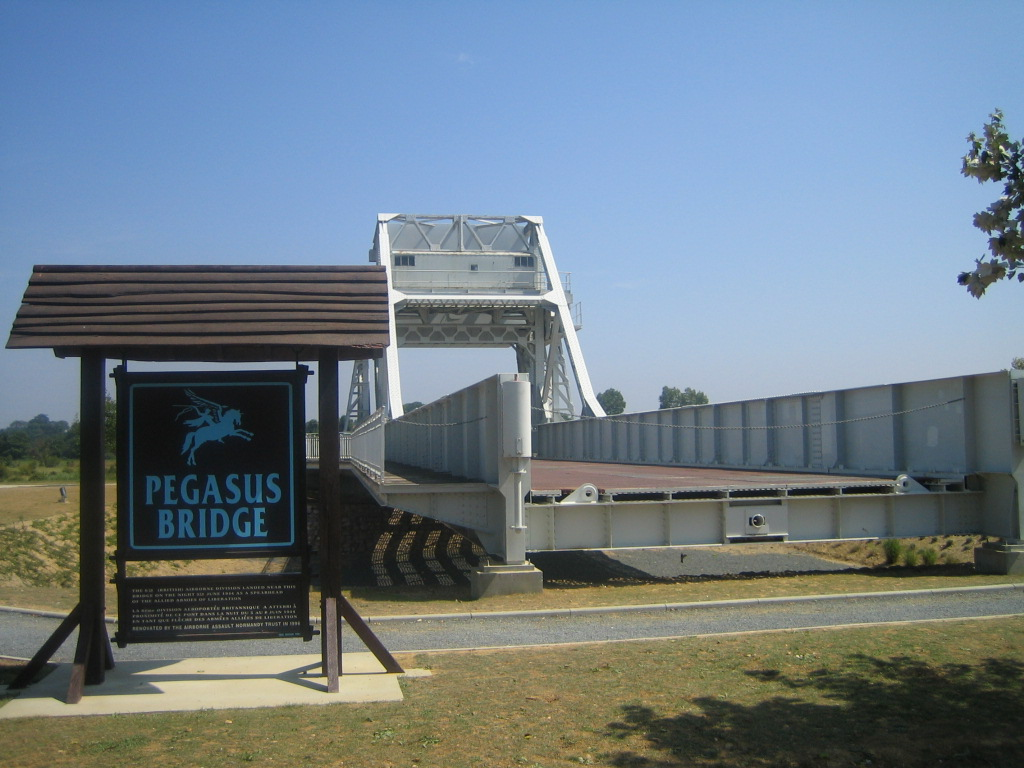
Pegasus Bridge at the Memorial Pegasus

Memorial Pegasus at Ranville in Lower Normandy is a museum and memorial to the 6th Airborne Division in the Normandy landings and particular the capture of the Caen canal and Orne river bridges.

== History ==
In 1974 the Airborne Forces Museum was opened on the west bank of the Caen Canal at Bénouville by the D-Day Commemoration Committee. It was opposite the glider landing site and close to the Bénouville Bridge. The museum was opened by British General Sir Richard Gale who had been the divisional commander of the 6th Airborne during the Normandy Landings. Because of problems caused by the end of the lease the museum closed in 1997.

The Bénouville Bridge had been renamed Pegasus Bridge on 26 June 1944 in honour of being the first objective taken by the airborne troops in the Normandy campaign. In 1993 the Bridge over the Caen Canal was removed and replaced by a new structure. The bridge was placed on waste ground close to its original position.

With the closure of the first museum a campaign was started by Raymond Triboulet and the D-Day Commemoration Committee to raise funds and find a site for a new museum. In 1999 the original Pegasus Bridge was bought by the committee from the French authorities for one Franc to be a focal-point for the new museum.

The new museum Memorial Pegasus was opened on 4 June 2000 by the then-Prince of Wales, who was Colonel-in-Chief of the Parachute Regiment.

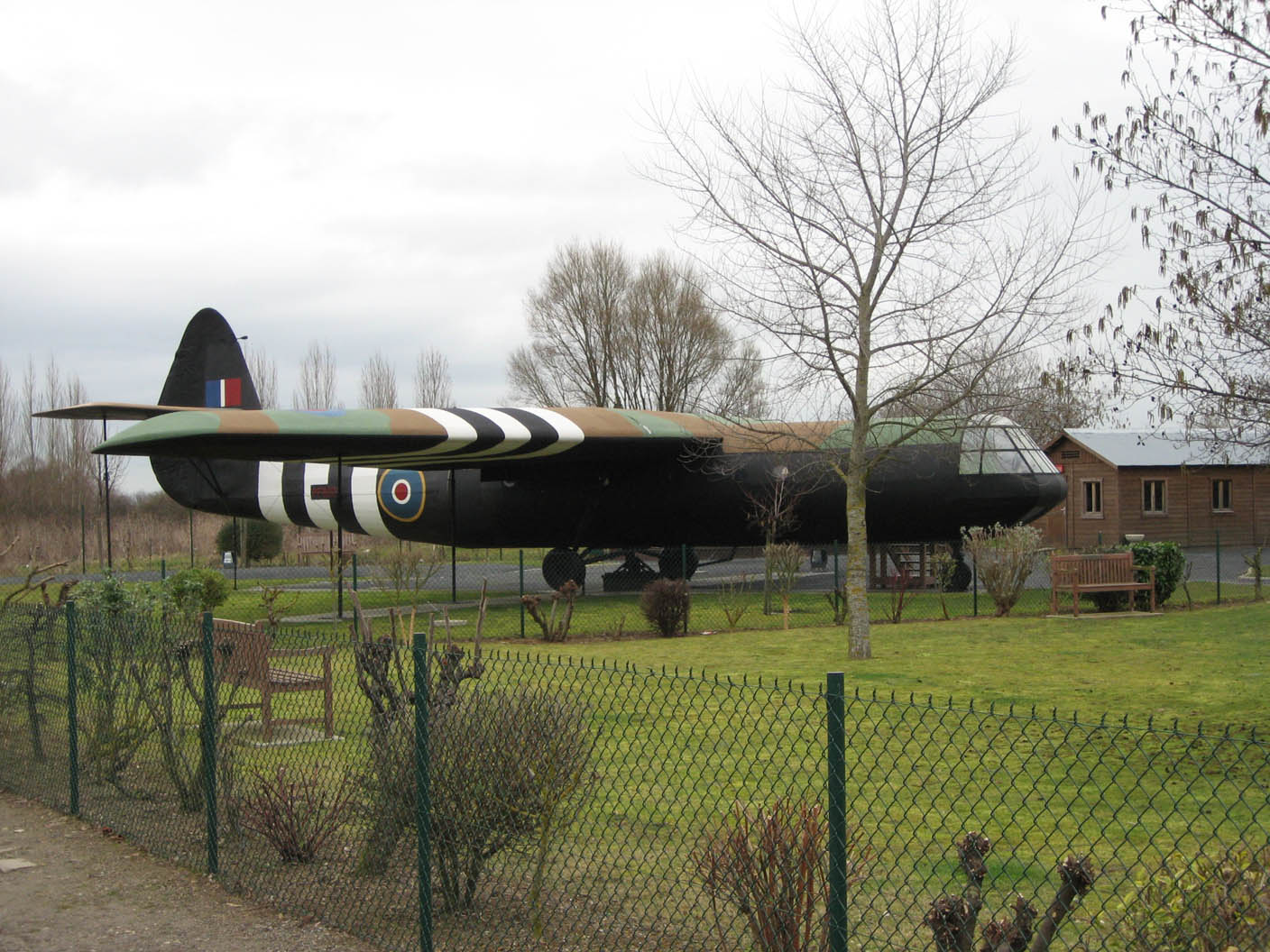
Replica Airspeed Horsa glider next to Pegasus Bridge in France

On 5 June 2004 a replica of the first Airspeed Horsa glider to land close to the Bénouville Bridge was officially inaugurated. At the inauguration, the Horsa glider was shown to the Prince of Wales by Jim Wallwork, the pilot of the first glider to land in June 1944.

== Museum ==
The museum building exhibits artifacts, exhibitions and personal objects related to the 6th Airborne Division.

A three-acre park contains the Pegasus Bridge, the replica of the Horsa glider and memorials to the men who captured the Caen canal and Orne river bridges.
