= John Howard (British Army officer) =

British Army officer (1912–1999)

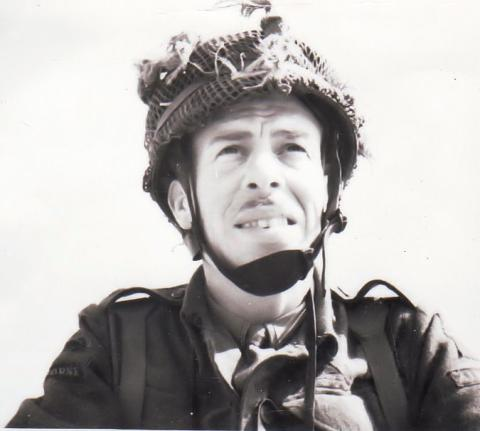
- Born: 8 December 1912; West End of London, England
- Died: 5 May 1999 (aged 86)
- Military career
- Allegiance: United Kingdom
- Branch: British Army
- Service years: 1932–1938; 1939–1946
- Rank: Major
- Service number: 155710
- Units: King's Shropshire Light Infantry; Oxfordshire and Buckinghamshire Light Infantry
- Conflicts: Second World War
- Awards: Distinguished Service Order; Croix de Guerre avec Palme (France)

Major Reginald John Howard DSO (8 December 1912 – 5 May 1999) was a British Army officer who led a glider-borne assault that captured the Caen canal and Orne river bridges on 6 June 1944, as part of the D-Day landings during the Second World War. These bridges spanned the Caen Canal and the adjacent River Orne (about 500 yards to the east), and were vitally important to the success of the D-Day landings. Since the war, the bridge over the canal has become known as "Pegasus Bridge," a tribute to the men who captured it. The bridge over the River Orne later became known as Horsa Bridge after the Horsa gliders that carried troops to the bridges.

Howard initially joined the British Army before the war, serving as a private soldier and then a non-commissioned officer for six years before discharging in 1938 and joining the Oxford City Police. In 1939 he was recalled to the army following the outbreak of the war and quickly rose through the ranks to become a regimental sergeant major in the King's Shropshire Light Infantry. In 1940 he was commissioned as a second lieutenant and eventually rose to be a major in 1942, at which time he took over command of 'D' Company, 2nd Battalion, Oxfordshire and Buckinghamshire Light Infantry. Before D-Day, Howard's company was selected to carry out the assault on the Caen and Orne River bridges and he became personally responsible for their training and the planning of the assault. During D-Day he led the company in a successful coup-de-main assault that gained control of the bridges and then held them until relieved. After D-Day, Howard commanded his company until September 1944 when they were withdrawn from the line. Due to the injuries he sustained in a car accident in November 1944, he took no further part in the war and was eventually invalided out of the British Army in 1946. After this he became a public servant before he retired in 1974.

His role in the assault on the bridges was detailed in a number of books and films since the war, and after he retired he gave a number of lectures in Europe and the United States on tactics and on the assault itself. He died in 1999, at the age of 86.

== Early life ==
Reginald John Howard was born on 8 December 1912 to Jack and Ethel Howard, who lived in London's West End. The eldest of nine children, Howard's family background was working class. His father worked as a cooper for Courage Brewery after serving in the trenches in France during the First World War, while his mother kept the house and looked after the children. During his formative years, Howard was an active member of the Boy Scouts, he also enjoyed attending school and did very well, earning a scholarship to attend secondary school. However, the economic situation at the time was hard and at the age of fourteen he began full-time work, working as a clerk at a broker's firm. To further his education he took evening classes and continued with the Scouts. In 1931, however, he found himself out of work, after the brokerage firm that he was working for went out of business.

In 1932, Howard enlisted into the British Army and undertook recruit training at Shrewsbury and was assigned to the King's Shropshire Light Infantry (KSLI). He excelled at physical training and did consistently well on army exams. He became a company clerk and later a physical training instructor. On the basis of his education he applied for a commission as an officer but was rejected, although he was promoted to corporal.

In June 1938, he was discharged from the Army, having served his six-year enlistment period, and joined the Oxford City Police. On 28 October 1939 he married Joy Bromley - whom he had met in 1936 - and with whom he would later have two children, Terry and Penny.

On 2 December 1939, nearly three months since the outbreak of the Second World War, he rejoined the KSLI as a corporal. He was, however, quickly promoted to Company sergeant major and within five months of joining was the Regimental sergeant major of the battalion. Offered the opportunity of a commission he went to 166th Officer Cadet Training Unit in mid-1940. On graduation he was commissioned as a 2nd Lieutenant in the 2nd Battalion, Oxfordshire and Buckinghamshire Light Infantry (Ox & Bucks) on 9 November 1940. He rose to captain commanding a company for over a year. When the battalion was marked for conversion to airborne in early 1942, Howard volunteered, accepting demotion to 2nd lieutenant and command of a platoon. (Note: Only about half of the original men of the battalion made the transition; their places were filled by volunteers from other units of the Army.) He was subsequently promoted, becoming a major in May 1942 and became company commander of 'D' Company which he trained for the next two years.

== D-Day landings ==
The Orne river formed the eastern, or left, flank of the Allied landings at Normandy on 6 June 1944. Control of both bridges was vital because Allied forces needed the Orne as a geographic barrier against an immediate counter-attack against the allied flank by German forces, and because access to a lateral road would ensure supplies from Sword Beach to the 6th Airborne Division, which had been dropped to the east of Caen. Supplies of ammunition, fuel and rations were essential if the 6th Airborne was to effectively protect the left flank of the Allied invasion force. Furthermore, the crossings had to be held, undamaged, so as to serve as causeways from the beach landing areas, when the Allies moved forward.

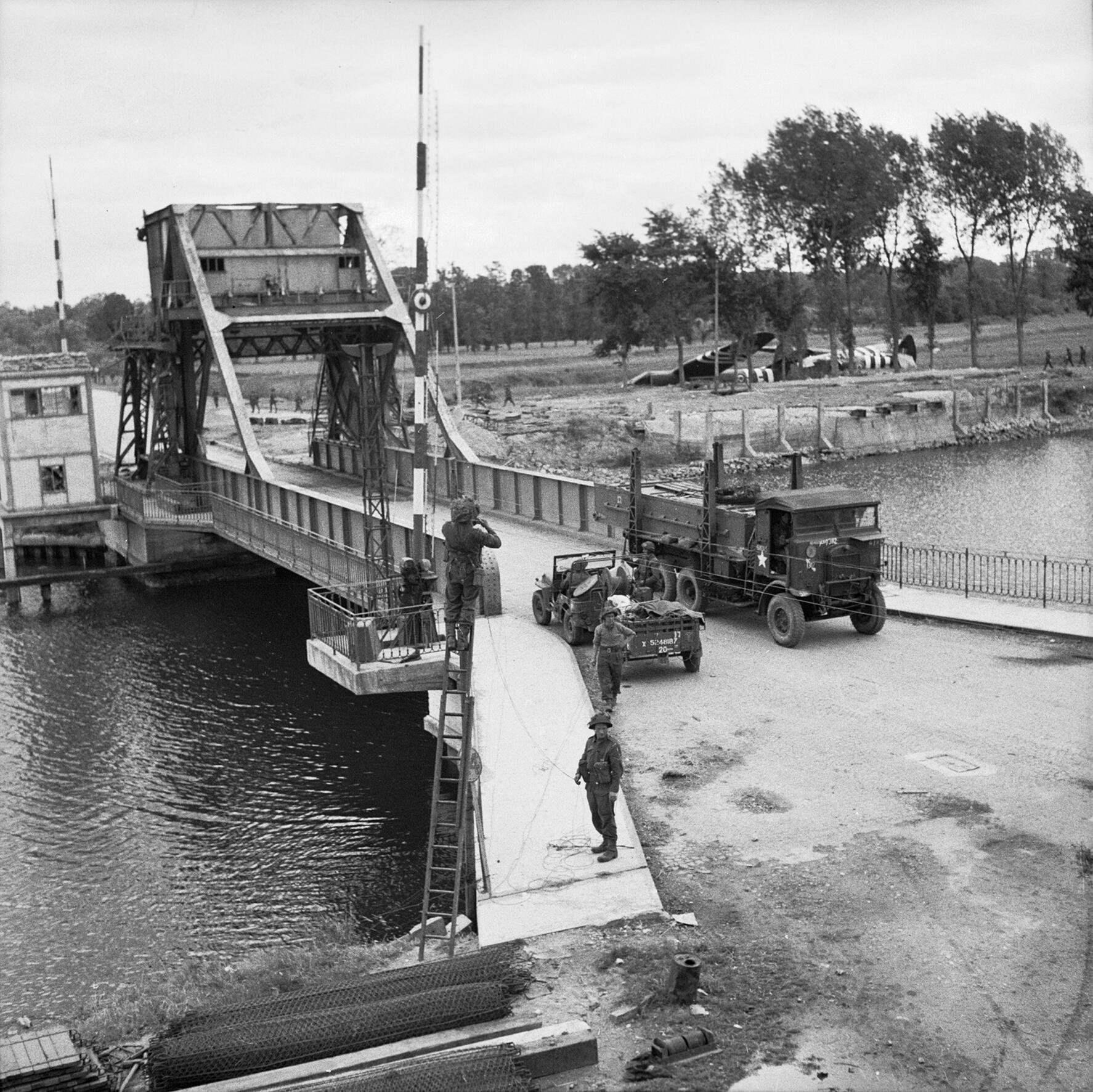
Pegasus Bridge, 9 June 1944; Horsa gliders can be seen where they landed next to it.

Howard led 'D' Company and an engineer detachment, in a glider-borne assault in the early hours of 6 June 1944. Howard's Horsa glider was piloted by Staff Sergeant Jim Wallwork DFM and towed by a Halifax A.V bomber from 298 Sqn piloted by the squadron's commanding officer Wing Commander Derek Duder DFC DSO. The gliders were released at 8,000 feet over the Normandy coast, three gliders, each carrying about 28 heavily armed troops—in total 90 men, pilots included—clipped the tops of a group of poplar trees skirting a very small field and a dangerous pool and bounced to a halt only a few yards from each other, at precisely 0016 hours. (Note: Double British Summertime = 23:16 local time.) All gliders were brought to an immediate halt, almost on top of the objectives—the nose was "buried in barbed wire and almost on the bridge", in the words of a soldier under Howard. The assault troops engaged their objectives almost from the moment they stepped outside of the wreckage of their aircraft. The German defenders were taken completely by surprise for they had almost no time to react, form, and attempt a defence of the objectives; since the British force had, in effect, landed within the boundary of the objective. Some of the Germans were caught asleep in their gun pits. Only one German soldier was able to fire a Very pistol to try to warn soldiers on the Orne bridge a few hundred yards away, but by the time he fired, the other bridge had been overrun. There was no time to attempt to blow the bridge, and even if there had been, the explosives needed for the job had never been fitted to the bridge. It was the classic example of a "commando-style" military operation, where surprise is the attacker's greatest asset; and when it is executed as planned, surprise is complete because the attackers in the event, face essentially no opposition. Virtually all of their casualties in the assault, are either from friendly fire, or accident.

At least two armed German halftracks belonging to an engineer company and followed by panzergrenadiers tried to attack the bridge at 1:30 a.m., but the first was destroyed by a PIAT. (Note: According to Ambrose a German tank was destroyed but British eyewitness reports from 6 June daytime as well as Sergeant Thornton's Military Medal citation refer to it as an armoured carrier, most likely a halftrack armed with cannon; note by drs. Carles Wolterman, Amstelveen, the Netherlands) The other Panzers thought they were up against a bigger enemy force armed with a 6-pounder anti-tankgun and so immediately retreated. A more forceful German counter-attack came in the early hours of D-Day, when German divisional headquarters realised the bridges had been taken intact. By that time, Howard and his glider troops had been bolstered by both fresh airborne parachute landings The 2nd Ox and Bucks coup de main platoons holding the bridges were relieved by 7th Parachute Battalion at 03:00. Later on D-Day a detachment of British Commandos of the 1st Special Service Brigade, led by Brigadier Lord Lovat, marched to the bridge to the tune of Bill Millin's bagpipes. With these reinforcements, they were able to hold Pegasus Bridge against an attack by elements of the 21st Panzer Division, strongly supported by artillery.

Following the attack on the bridges on D-Day, instead of being removed from the line to commence training for further operations 'D' Company was used as a normal infantry company. Howard was nominated for the Distinguished Service Order for his leadership during the capture of the bridges and, on 16 July 1944, was presented with the medal by Field Marshal (at the time General) Bernard Montgomery, although the award was not officially confirmed until 31 August. 'D' Company remained in Normandy fighting until 5 September 1944, after 91 days of continuous fighting.

Upon return to Bulford, Howard began to reform and reorganise his company in preparation for future operations. They were not withdrawn from the line in time to take part in Operation Market Garden and in the end it had been decided not to employ a coup-de-main assault on the bridges at Nijmegen and Arnhem. Nevertheless, Howard began the process of training 'D' Company in the hope of returning to combat. However, it was not to be. On 13 November 1944, he was involved in a car accident and was badly injured. He took no further part in the war and remained in hospital until March 1945. 'D' Company, led by Major, later Colonel, John Tillett, went on to fight during the Battle of the Bulge, the crossing of the Rhine in Operation Varsity and in the advance across Germany to the Baltic Sea.

== Later life ==
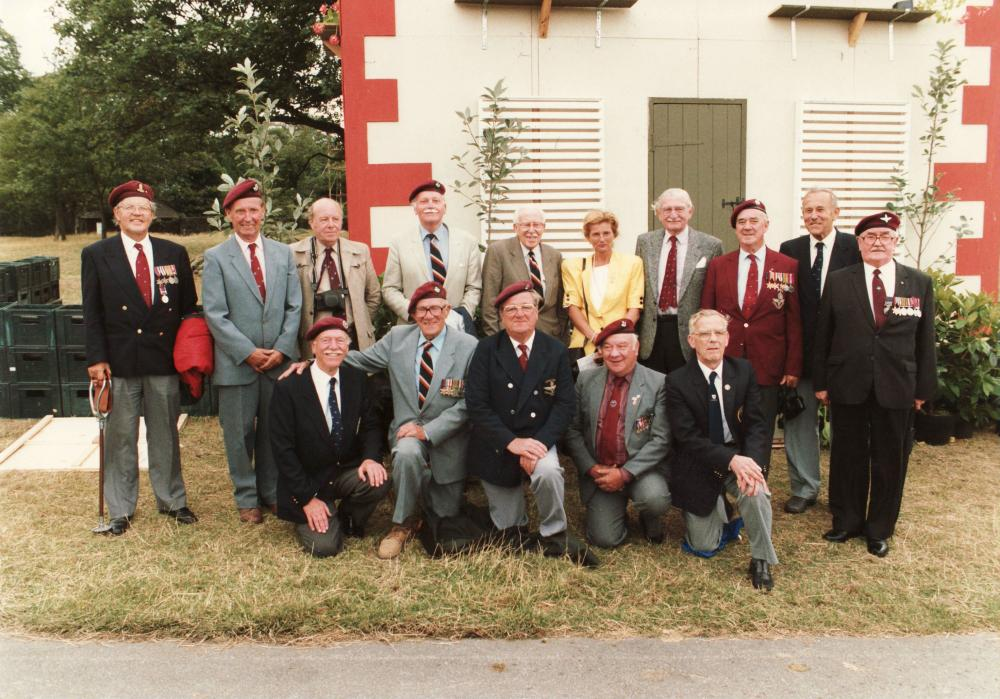
Group photograph of British veterans, Major Howard among them, in Normandy, France, 1982.

In 1946, despite wishing to continue serving, Howard was invalided out of the Army as a result of injuries that he received in the accident, and he went to work for the Ministry of Agriculture. In 1954 he was awarded the Croix de Guerre avec Palme by the French government. On 6 June 1959, Cornelius Ryan published The Longest Day, in which 'D' Company's assault on the bridges was detailed. In 1962, Howard's experiences on D-Day were re-enacted by actor Richard Todd—who had himself participated in the raid, serving in the 7th Parachute Battalion, sent to reinforce Howard's coup-de-main party—in the 1962 film The Longest Day, which was largely based on Ryan's book, although it was a dramatised account. In 1985, Stephen Ambrose published a book on the assault on the bridges, called Pegasus Bridge.

In 1974 Howard retired from the public service and he and his wife Joy moved to the village of Burcot, near Oxford. Later he moved to an old country house in Surrey and in 1986 his wife, Joy, died. In his later life Howard returned to Normandy on 6 June every year to lay a wreath at the location where the gliders landed and was involved in the creation and maintenance of an airborne forces museum near the bridge. He also lectured cadets in the United Kingdom, France, Norway, Sweden, the United States and many other NATO countries. In the 1960s, Howard met and befriended Hans von Luck, a senior officer in the 21st Panzer Division who had been unable to assist in the defence of Pegasus Bridge on 6 June.

Howard died on 5 May 1999, at the age of 86. The new Memorial Pegasus museum was opened by the Prince of Wales on 4 June 2000. In 2006, his daughter, Penny, published Howard's private papers, titled Pegasus Diaries. (Note: See "Further reading" section for the full bibliographic details of these works.)

== Bibliography ==
- Ambrose, Stephen E. (1985) [2003]. Pegasus Bridge. London: Simon and Schuster. ISBN 0-7434-5068-X.
- Ryan, Cornelius (1959). The Longest Day; 6 June 1944. New York: Simon and Schuster. OCLC 1175409. 671-20814-1.
- Von Luck, Hans (1989). Panzer Commander: The Memoirs of Colonel Hans Von Luck. Dell Publishing. ISBN 0440208025.
