= Pegasus Bridge =

Canal bridge in Normandy; scene of a WWII battle

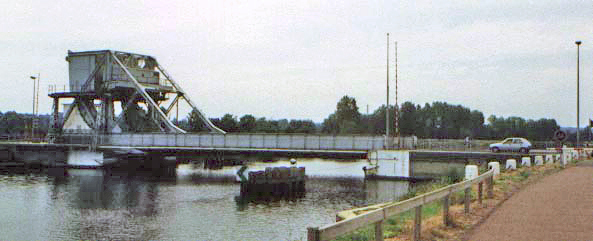
- Pegasus Bridge before its replacement
- Coordinates: 49°14′32″N 0°16′28″W
- Crosses: Caen Canal
- Locale: Bénouville

Characteristics
- Design: Bascule bridge

History
- Opened: 1934

Location
- Interactive map of Pegasus Bridge

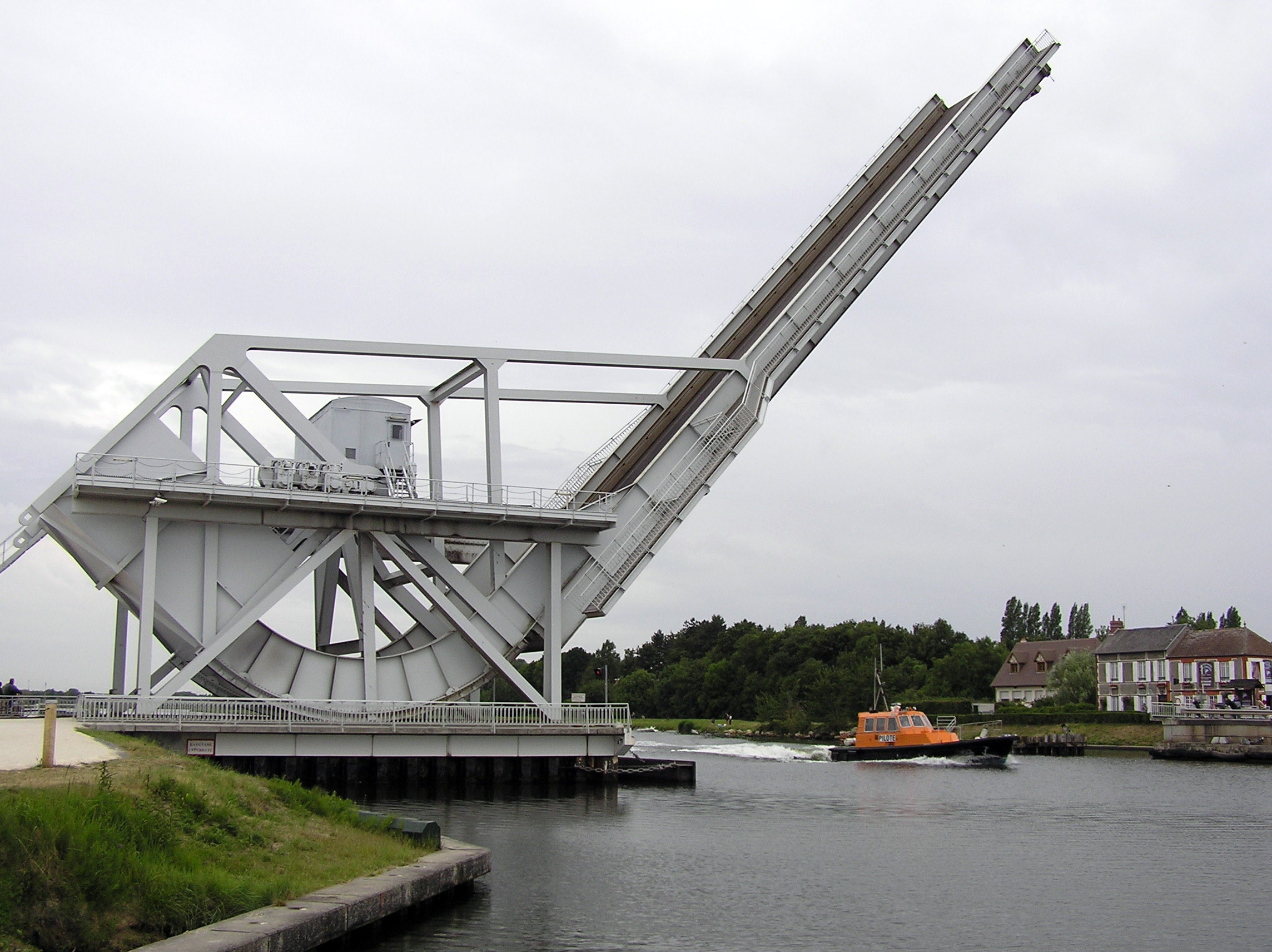
The replacement Pegasus Bridge built in 1994

Pegasus Bridge, originally called the Bénouville Bridge after the neighbouring village, is a road crossing over the Caen Canal, between Caen and Ouistreham in Normandy. The original bridge, built in 1934, is now a war memorial and is the centrepiece of the Memorial Pegasus museum at nearby Ranville. It was replaced in 1994 by a modern design which, like the old one, is a bascule bridge.

On 6 June 1944, during the Second World War, the bridge was, along with the nearby Ranville Bridge over the Orne River (another road crossing, later renamed Horsa Bridge), the objective of members of D Company, 2nd (Airborne) Battalion, Oxfordshire and Buckinghamshire Light Infantry, a glider-borne force who were part of the 6th Airlanding Brigade of the 6th Airborne Division during Operation Tonga in the opening minutes of the Allied invasion of Normandy. Under the command of Major John Howard, D Company was to land close by the bridges in six Airspeed Horsa gliders and, in a coup-de-main operation, take both intact and hold them until relieved by the main British invasion forces. The successful capture of the bridges played an important role in limiting the effectiveness of a German counter-attack in the aftermath of the Normandy invasion, as did the attack on nearby Merville Gun Battery.

Later in 1944, the Bénouville Bridge was renamed Pegasus Bridge in honour of the operation. The name is derived from the shoulder emblem worn by British airborne forces of I Airborne Corps (United Kingdom), which depicts Bellerophon riding the flying horse Pegasus.

== Design ==
Pegasus Bridge and the structure that replaced it in 1994 are examples of a distinct sub type of bascule bridge, the "Scherzer rolling lift bascule bridge" or "rolling bridge". Bridges of this type do not pivot about a hinge point, but roll back on curved tread plates attached to the girders of the main span. This design allows a greater clearance of the waterway for a given opening angle.

== Battle for the bridge ==
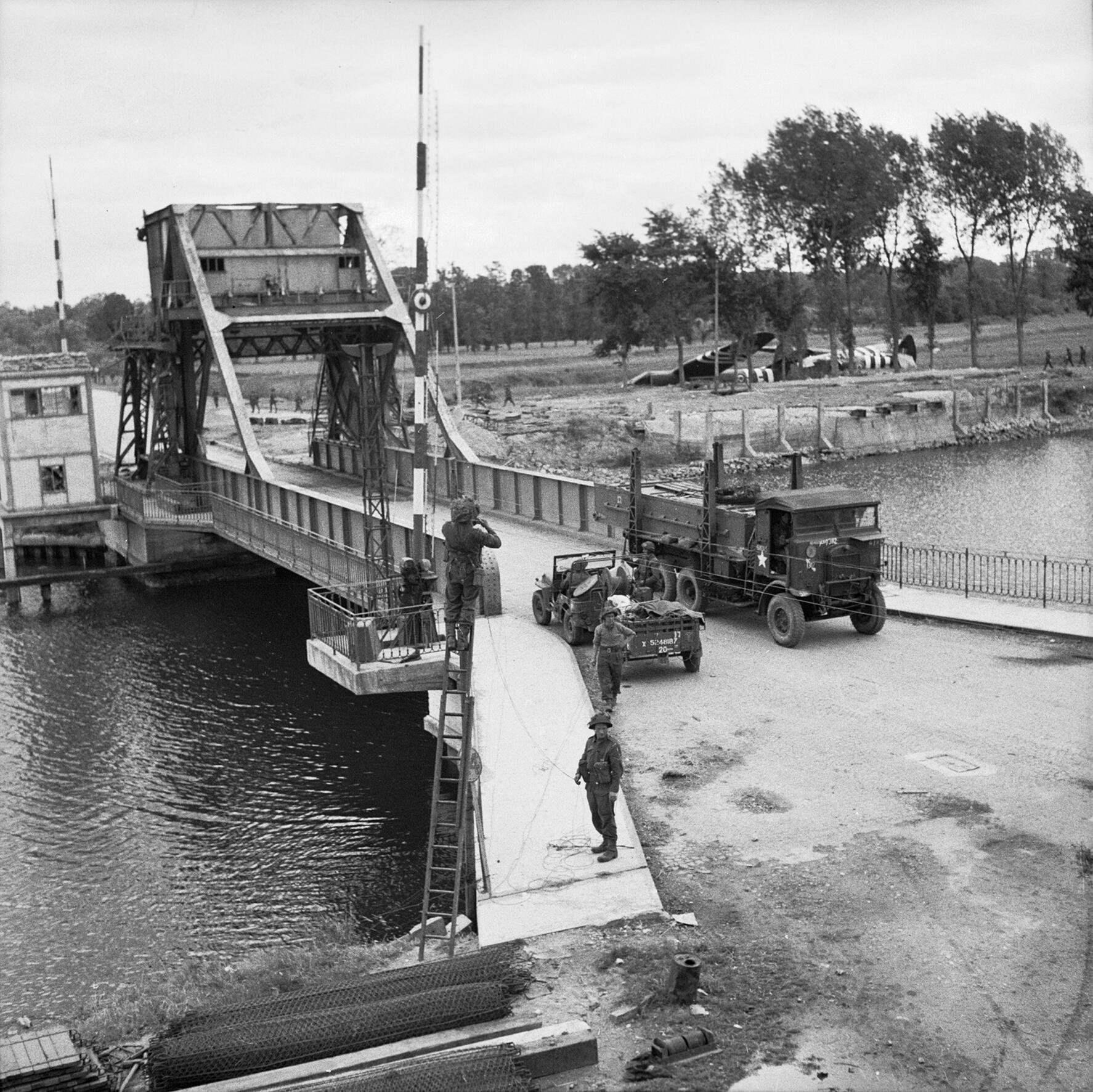
Pegasus Bridge, 9 June 1944; Horsa gliders can be seen top right where they landed.

On the night of 5 June 1944, a force of 181 men, led by Major John Howard, were towed from RAF Tarrant Rushton in Dorset, southern England in six Horsa gliders to capture Pegasus Bridge, and also "Horsa Bridge", a few hundred yards/metres to the east, over the Orne River. The force was composed of D Company (reinforced with two platoons of B Company), 2nd Battalion, Oxford and Bucks Light Infantry; 20 sappers of the Royal Engineers of 249 Field Company (Airborne); and men of the Glider Pilot Regiment. The object of this action was to prevent German armour from crossing the bridges and attacking the eastern flank of the landings at Sword Beach, and to prevent the British 6th Airborne Division from being cut off.

Five of the Ox and Bucks's gliders landed as close as 47 yd (43 m) from their objectives 16 minutes past midnight. The attackers poured out of their battered gliders, completely surprising the German defenders, and took the bridges within 10 minutes. They lost two men in the process, Lance corporal Fred Greenhalgh and Lieutenant Den Brotheridge.

The impact of the crash landing of his glider threw Greenhalgh out of the glider and into a shallow pond. Face down and unconscious, he drowned, becoming the first Allied casualty. Lieutenant Brotheridge was mortally wounded crossing the bridge in the first minutes of the assault and became the first member of the invading Allied armies to die as a result of enemy fire on D-Day.

One glider, assigned to the capture of the Orne river bridge, landed at the bridge over the River Dives, some 7 mi (11 km) away. Most of the soldiers in this glider moved through German lines towards the village of Ranville where they eventually re-joined the British forces. The Ox and Bucks were reinforced at 03.00hrs by Lieutenant Colonel Pine-Coffin's 7th Parachute Battalion, and linked up with the beach landing forces with the arrival of [The rifles] Lord Lovat's Commandos.

Among the first of the 7th Battalion reinforcements was Lieutenant Richard Todd, a young actor, who, nearly two decades later, would play Major Howard in the film The Longest Day.

=== Commemorations ===
In 1984, as part of the 40th anniversary commemorations, HMY Britannia sailed past the bridge en route to Caen. The ship passed in the early hours, escorted by two tugs and HMS Torquay.

== Today ==
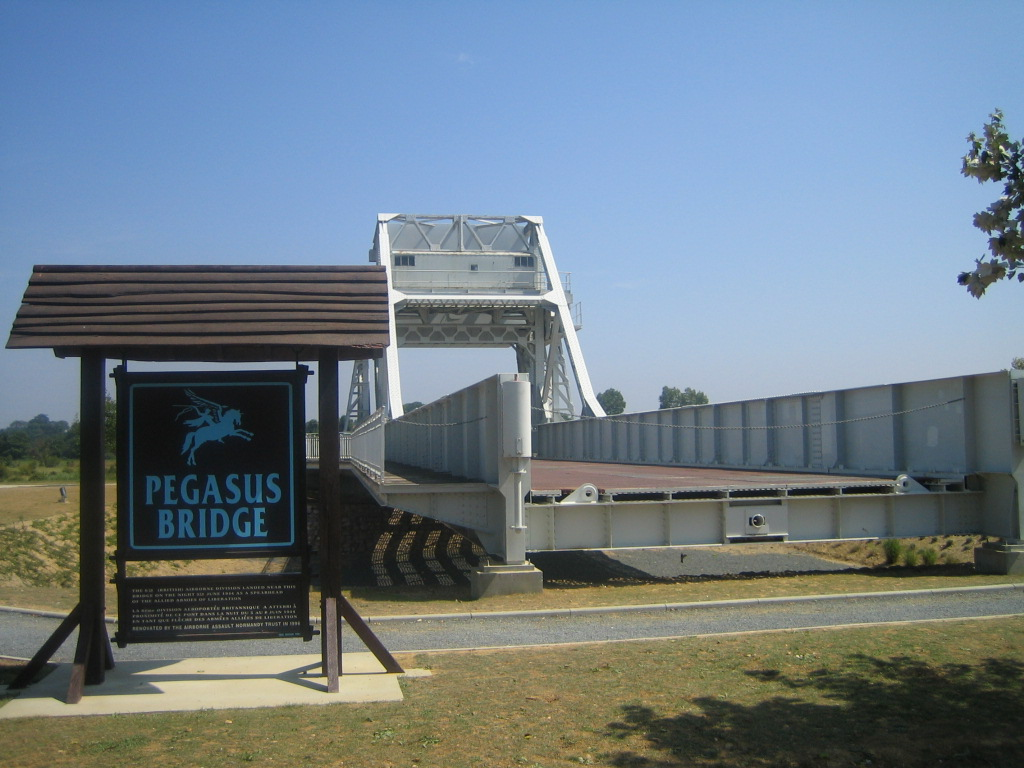
The original bridge in the Memorial Pegasus – July 2005

The original Pegasus Bridge now resides in the grounds of the Pegasus Museum. The museum was inaugurated by the Prince of Wales on 4 June 2000, Brigadier James Hill, Françoise Gondrée foundress with General Sir Richard Nelson Gale as Président, and lies at the Eastern end of the current bridge. The original bridge was replaced in 1994 by the wider, stronger structure, built by Spie Batignolles. It had been extended by five meters in the early 1960s to accommodate the widening of the canal and remained in use until 1993. After its replacement, Pegasus Bridge was left on waste ground. The bridge was sold to the museum for the symbolic price of one franc.

Many of the soldiers killed in the actions of June 1944 are buried in the war cemetery at Ranville. Lt. Brotheridge's grave, which is located in the churchyard next to the cemetery, has a commemorative plaque that was installed by the Gondrée family. The museum contains a café and a small museum shop that sells Pegasus Bridge related material. Arlette Gondrée, who now runs Café Gondrée, was a small child living in the home when it was liberated. It is not certain that the famous Gondrée café was the first French house to be liberated during D-Day. In the book Commando du Pont Pegase, French historian Norbert Hugedé writes that it was the house owned by Mr Picot that was liberated first, a few hours before the Gondrées' house.

Pegasus Wood, in the grounds of Temple Newsam House in Leeds, commemorates veterans of the landing at Pegasus Bridge.

== See also ==
- 92nd (Loyals) Light Anti-Aircraft Regiment, Royal Artillery
- David Wood (British Army officer)
- Horsa Bridge
- Merville Gun Battery
