= Jim Wallwork =

British soldier, D-Day glider pilot (1919-2013)

- Born: James Harley Wallwork; 21 October 1919; Salford, England
- Died: 24 January 2013 (aged 93); White Rock, British Columbia, Canada
- Military career
- Allegiance: United Kingdom
- Branch: British Army
- Service years: 1939–1945
- Rank: Staff Sergeant
- Nickname: Jim
- Service number: 903986
- Units: Royal Artillery; York and Lancaster Regiment; Glider Pilot Regiment
- Conflicts: Second World War: Allied invasion of Sicily; Battle of Normandy; Operation Market Garden; Operation Plunder
- Awards: Distinguished Flying Medal
- Other work: Farmer

Staff Sergeant James Harley Wallwork DFM (21 October 1919 – 24 January 2013) was a British soldier and a member of the Glider Pilot Regiment who achieved notability as the pilot of the first Horsa glider to land at Pegasus Bridge in France in the early hours of D-Day, 6 June 1944, during the Second World War. This achievement was described as "the greatest feat of flying of the Second World War" by Air Chief Marshal Sir Trafford Leigh-Mallory. Although most noted for his part in the Battle of Normandy, Wallwork flew gliders in every major British airborne operation of the Second World War. These also included the Sicily landings, Arnhem and the Rhine Crossings. In later life he lived in Vancouver.

== Early life ==
He was born in Salford, son of an artilleryman who had served during the First World War. When Wallwork volunteered for the British Army in May 1939 his father advised him against joining the infantry. He was assigned to the Royal Artillery, to the Territorial Army's 53rd Field Regiment, RA, part of the 42nd (East Lancashire) Infantry Division, before being posted to the 111th Field Regiment, RA, part of the 66th Infantry Division. In late May 1940 he was posted to an infantry unit, the 9th Battalion of the York and Lancaster Regiment.

He soon became bored with the infantry, however, and, despite being promoted to sergeant, he tried to join the Royal Air Force. This was blocked by his commanding officer although in 1942 he was accepted for training in the newly formed Glider Pilot Regiment. By May 1942 he was at flight training school.

== Pegasus Bridge ==
After training at Tarrant Rushton airfield in Dorset, Wallwork set off on the evening of 5 June 1944 for the beginning of the invasion of Normandy. Shortly after midnight on 6 June he landed his Horsa glider in occupied France, ending up less than 50 ft (15 m) from the water tower of the Benouville Bridge. The force of the impact catapulted both Wallwork and his co-pilot John Ainsworth through the front of the cockpit. Although stunned, this made them the first Allied troops to touch French soil on D-Day.

== Post war ==
After the war, Wallwork worked as a salesman. In 1956 he emigrated to British Columbia, Canada. He ran a small livestock farm to the east of Vancouver.
