= Coup de main =

Military tactic of attacking swiftly

A coup de main (French pronunciation: [ku də mɛ̃], plural: coups de main, 'blow with the hand') (Note: In French, coup de main can also mean "a helping hand" (informal language) or "know-how" by common usage) is a swift attack that relies on speed and surprise to accomplish its objectives in a single blow.

== Definition ==
The United States Department of Defense defines it as "An offensive operation that capitalizes on surprise and simultaneous execution of supporting operations to achieve success in one swift stroke."

The term coup de main originally meant "by direct assault rather than by artillery".

== Examples ==
The first airborne assault by the Allies in World War II during the invasion of Normandy, on Pegasus Bridge, is sometimes referred to as Operation Coup de Main, although the actual code name for the British airborne attack was Operation Tonga.

In the American Civil War, Emory Upton used the tactic for the Union Army during the Battle of Spotsylvania Courthouse.

During the Second Battle of Porto, Arthur Wellesley crossed the Douro in a coup de main attack upon the French forces of Marshal Soult.

== See also ==
- Battle of Fort Eben-Emael
- Blitzkrieg
- Coup d'état
- Coup de grâce
- Leadership spill (can be considered a political application of the concept)
- Raid on Drvar
- Siege
- Tatsinskaya Raid
