= Canton of Champtoceaux =

Coordinates: 47°18′24″N 1°12′55″W

Champtoceaux
- Former canton
- Interactive map of Champtoceaux
- Country: France
- Region: Pays de la Loire
- Department: Maine-et-Loire
- No. of communes: {{{nbcomm}}}
- Disbanded: 2015
- Area: 157 km^{2} (61 sq mi)
- Population (2012): 15,824
  - Density: 101/km^{2} (261/sq mi)

Canton of Champtoceaux is a former canton of France, located in the Maine-et-Loire department, in the Pays de la Loire region. It had 15,824 inhabitants (2012). It was disbanded following the French canton reorganisation which came into effect in March 2015. It consisted of 9 communes, which joined the canton of La Pommeraye in 2015.

== Communes ==
The canton comprised the following communes:

1. Champtoceaux
2. Bouzillé
3. Drain
4. Landemont
5. Liré
6. Saint-Christophe-la-Couperie
7. Saint-Laurent-des-Autels
8. Saint-Sauveur-de-Landemont
9. La Varenne

== See also ==
- Arrondissement of Cholet
- Cantons of the Maine-et-Loire department
- Communes of the Maine-et-Loire department
