= François-Régis de La Bourdonnaye =

French politician

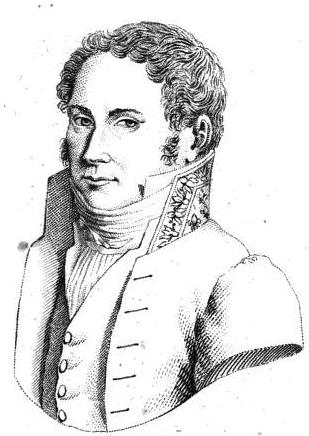
- Portrait from Biographie pittoresque des députés, Paris, 1820
- Born: March 19, 1767; La Varenne, Maine-et-Loire, France
- Died: July 28, 1839 (aged 72); Drain, Maine-et-Loire, France

François-Régis de La Bourdonnaye, Comte de La Bretèche, (19 March 1767 – 28 July 1839) was a French national deputy from 1815 to 1830. He sat on the extreme right, and was known for his violent attacks on the governments of the Bourbon Restoration. In 1829 he was briefly Minister of the Interior. In 1830 he was made a peer of France a few months before the July Revolution ended his political career.

== Early years ==
François-Régis de La Bourdonnaye was born in La Varenne, Maine-et-Loire, on 19 March 1767. He was from a noble Breton family which participated in the crusades, and of which a branch had settled in Anjou a century before. In 1786 he joined the Austrasia infantry regiment as an officer. In the early days of the French Revolution 1789–1799 he was a member of the pro-monarchy Chevaliers du poignard (Knights of the dagger) who placed themselves at the service of King Louis XVI. He was arrested at the Tuileries on 28 February 1791 by the National Guard, and after a few days of detention was sent back to his regiment at Briançon.

La Bourdonnaye left France to join the army of Condé in October 1791, and spent several months in Switzerland after it was dissolved. He returned to France under the Directory and stayed for a short period in Orléans under the name of Guibert. On 23 Fructidor V he married Mlle Volaige de Vaugirauld at Angers. He was forced to temporarily leave France again, and returned to Switzerland in Vendémiaire VI. He remained there until October 1802, when he returned to live at the Château de Mésangeau in the Drain commune of the Maine-et-Loire department.

== First Empire ==
In 1802 La Bourdonnaye was called to the electoral college of the Maine-et-Loire department to represent the canton of Champtoceaux. On 6 Fructidor XI he was appointed to the General Council of Maine-et-Loire by decree. In the year XII he also became a member of the Angers Municipal Council, holding office until 1815. He proposed to the General Council in 1806 to make Napoleon the hereditary ruler, and was twice commissioned by the Municipal Council and General Council to carry to the foot of the throne the "tribute of gratitude and admiration of the department". In 1807 he ran as a candidate to the legislative body, but was not elected. He was Secretary of the General Council in 1807. He chaired the General Council in 1813 and 1814, and in this role in 1814 requested and received from his colleagues the oath of allegiance to the king.

== Bourbon Restoration ==
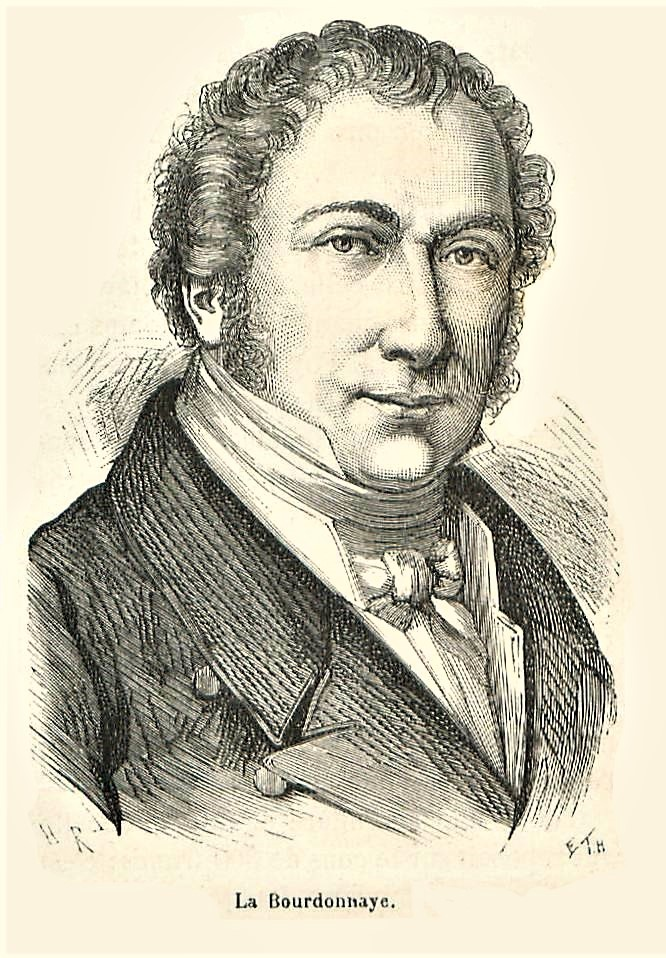
François Régis de La Bourdonnaye, comte de La Bretèche

On 22 August 1815 La Bourdonnaye was elected deputy of Maine-et-Loire in the National Assembly. He soon took a position in the extreme right of the royalist party, and became seen as the leader of this group. On 11 November 1815 he presented a proposal to extend the lists of proscribed people to include three categories. The first was those who held important military or civil positions during the Hundred Days in 1815 when Napoleon regained power. The second included generals, corps commanders, garrison commanders and prefects who went over to the usurper, flew his flag or obeyed his orders. The third category included regicides who accepted positions from the usurper, sat in the Chambers or signed the Charter of 1815. The first and second categories should be tried and sentenced to death, while the third should be condemned to civil death. The revenues of all three should be sequestered. The Amnesty Bill tabled by the Duke of Richelieu on 8 December 1815 drew on La Bourdonnaye's proposal but was more lenient, and was accepted.

Now known as the "category man", La Bourdonnaye was reelected on 4 October 1816 despite opposition from the Decazes ministry. He took the opportunity of the debate over the electoral laws to oppose the government. He first challenged the idea that 100,000 voters could represent the whole nation, but rather than propose enfranchising more voters, he proposed less, conjuring a picture of ambitious men using the mob to gain power. He also fought against laws on personal freedom, the press, recruitment and promotion by seniority. He gained the new nickname of the "Ajax of the Right". His attacks on the Decazes ministry contributed to its overthrow in February 1820.

La Bourdonnaye was reelected on 13 November 1820. He continued to battle in the chamber, and joined with the left to attack the second Richelieu ministry, which was forced to resign in December 1821 after several hostile votes. At first he was more satisfied with the Ministry of Joseph de Villèle, but later became more hostile. At the opening session of 4 June 1822 the chamber named La Bourdonnaye as their first candidate for president, but the king preferred Auguste Ravez, the runner-up, and La Bourdonnaye had to settle for the vice- presidency.

When his friend François-René de Chateaubriand succeeded Mathieu de Montmorency as Minister of Foreign Affairs in 1823, La Bourdonnaye announced that he was breaking with him. He continued to express extreme right-wing views in the Chamber. He was reelected on 6 March 1824. In 1825 he supported compensation for the émigrés who had left France to avoid the Revolution, saying that despite the cost the bill would see "tranquility assured for ever, and all classes of society returned to their state before the Revolution." He was reelected on 24 November 1827. He failed to enter the cabinet of Martignac as Minister of Finance, and failed to be chosen as president of the Chamber, even though he won the most votes in the first poll. At this time his habitual opposition to the government seems to have lessened.

When Jules de Polignac formed his ministry in August 1829, he gave La Bourdonnaye the portfolio of the Interior. The appointment was highly controversial, and the liberal press recalled his association with the amnesty laws and the proscriptions, and with the oppression and executions that had followed in the south of France. La Bourdonnaye was unable to accept cabinet discipline, and resigned on 8 November 1829 when Polignac was made president of the council of ministers. He was named Minister of State and member of the Privy Council by a royal decree on 27 January 1830, and was raised to the peerage.

The July Revolution of 1830 ended La Bourdonnaye's political career. He retired to his Château de Mésangeau. He died there, near Drain, Maine-et-Loire, on 28 July 1839.
