= Martial de Guernon-Ranville =

French magistrate and politician

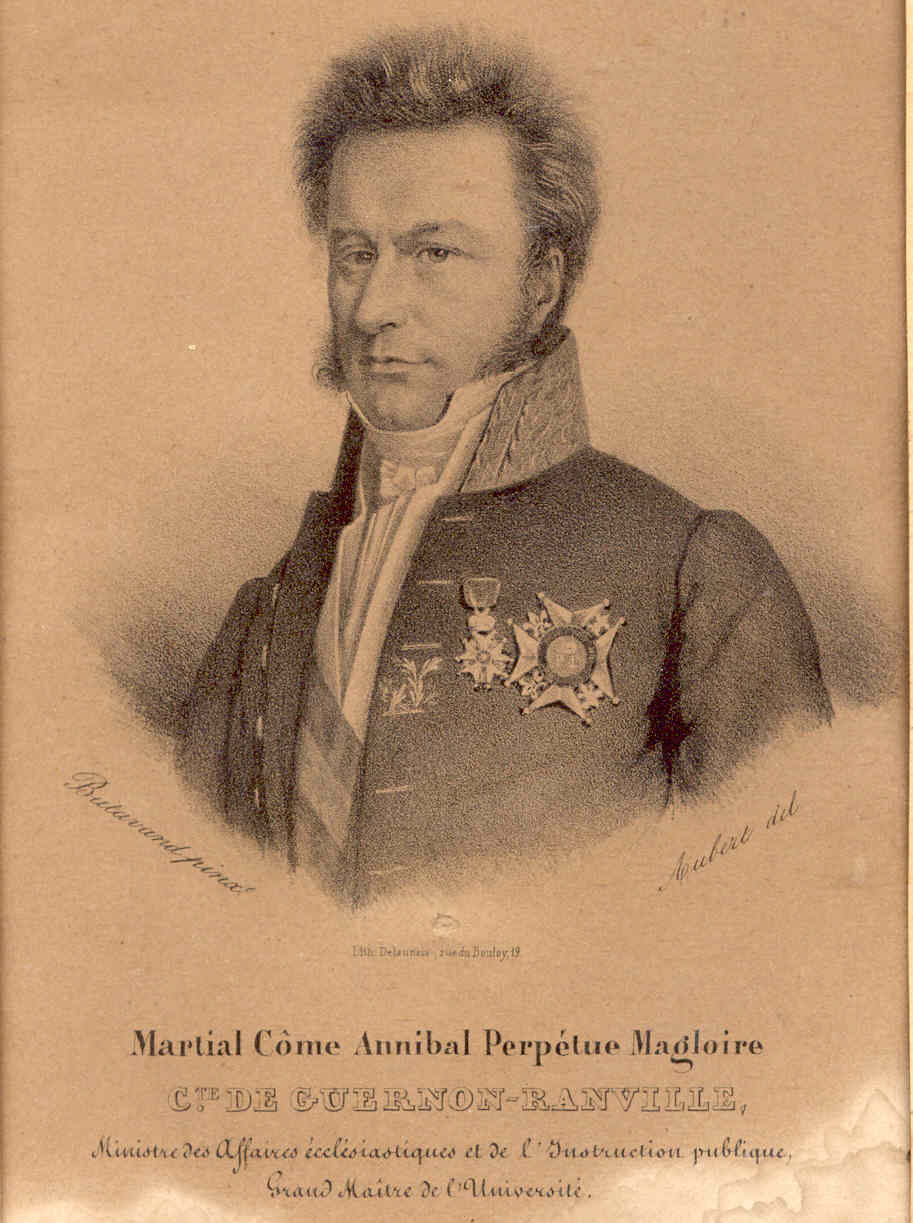
- Born: 2 May 1787; Caen, France
- Died: 30 November 1866 (aged 79); Chateau de Guernon-Ranville, Ranville, Calvados, France
- Occupations: Magistrate and politician
- Known for: Minister of Public Education and Religious Affairs

Count Martial Côme Annibal Perpétue Magloire de Guernon-Ranville (2 May 1787 – 30 November 1866) was a French magistrate and politician. He was Minister of Public Education and Religious Affairs in the Ministry of Jules de Polignac during the last months of the Bourbon Restoration.

== Early years ==
Martial Côme Annibal Perpétue Magloire de Guernon-Ranville came from the Guernon family, one of the oldest of the Norman nobility. They acquired the fief of Ranville in 1751, adding that name to their family name. Martial de Guernon-Ranville was born in Caen, Calvados, on 2 May 1787. Under Louis XVI his father was an officer in the "black musketeers", the musketeers of the military household of the King of France. In 1806 Martial de Guernon-Ranville enlisted in the skirmishers of the Imperial Guard, but was discharged due to myopia. He studied law, and was admitted to the bar in Caen.

Guernon-Ranville greeted the first Bourbon Restoration with enthusiasm. During the Hundred Days when Napoleon returned from exile he joined a company of young volunteers who wanted to fight the "usurper", but instead was sent to Ghent with his company to guard Louis XVIII. In 1820 he was appointed President of the Court of Bayeux. He became Advocate General at Colmar in 1822 and then was Attorney General in Limoges (1824), Grenoble (1826) and Lyon (1829). In his installation speech in this last position he clearly declared himself to be a counter-revolutionary.

== Minister ==
On 18 November 1829 Guernon-Ranville was appointed Minister for Ecclesiastical Affairs and Public Instruction and Grand Master of the University in the Polignac cabinet. His ordinance of 14 February 1830 showed his wish to improve the quality of primary education by giving credits to the communes, creating training schools for teachers and increasing their salaries. On 2 March 1830 he was elected deputy for Maine-et-Loire as replacement for François-Régis de La Bourdonnaye, who had been made a Peer of France. With growing unrest among the deputies, he was against the dissolution of the chamber and against extreme measures. He was reelected on 19 July 1830. He reluctantly signed the reactionary Ordinances on 25 July 1830 that inadvertently caused the July Revolution.

== Later career ==
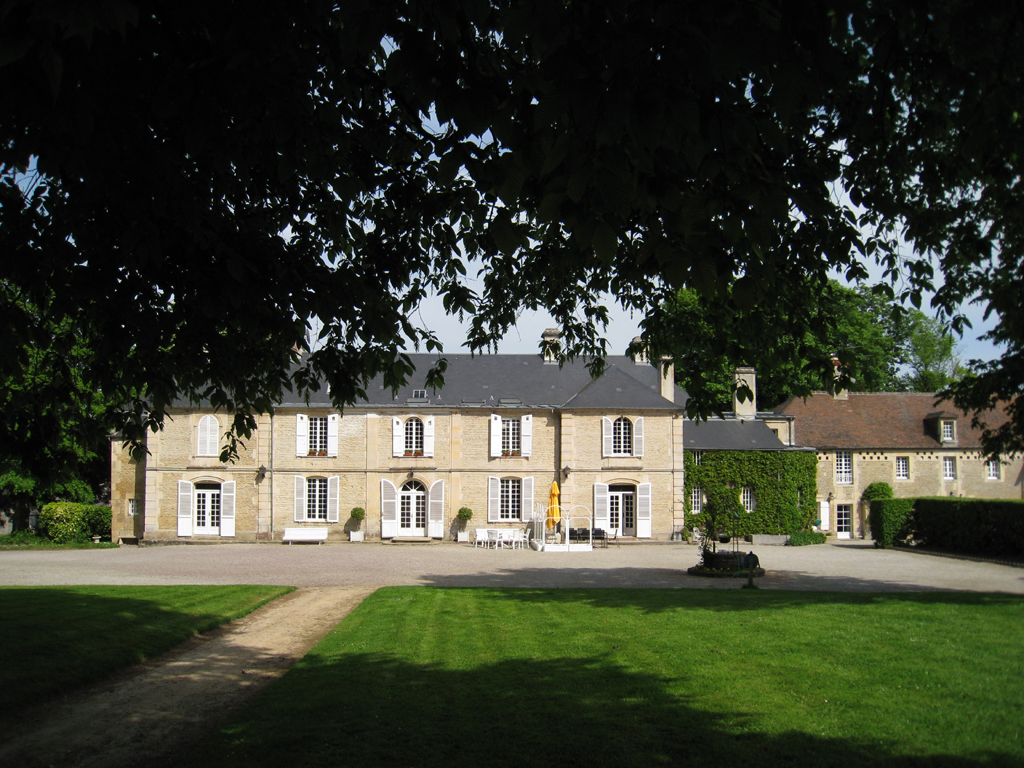
Château de Guernon-Ranville

Guernon-Ranville left office with the rest of the cabinet on 29 July 1830. After the departure of the royal family, he went to Tours and was arrested at the gates of this city and taken to the Château de Vincennes on the night of August 25–26. At the trial of Charles X's ministers before the Court of Peers he was defended by Adolphe Crémieux. He was sentenced to life imprisonment and jailed in the Château de Ham.

Guernon-Ranville was released on 23 November 1836 when a collective pardon was granted at the instigation of Molé ministry, and retired to the Chateau de Guernon-Ranville. The Chateau de Guernon-Ranville had been built at some time in the 18th century, and stayed in the family for almost two centuries. Guernon Ranville altered the chateau considerably. He stayed away from politics but actively participated in the cultural life of Caen as a member of the Academy of Sciences, Arts and Letters from 1841, the Horticultural Society and the Society of Agriculture and Commerce. He died on 30 November 1866 in the Chateau de Guernon-Ranville in the village of Ranville, Calvados.

== Bibliography ==
Works by Guernon-Ranville include:

- Essai sur la culture des cheveux, suivi de quelques réflexions sur l'art de la coiffure, par L.-J. Duflos,... Paris: Author. 1812. p. 28.
- Recherches historiques sur le jury,... suivies de quelques réflexions sur l'état actuel de cette institution en France et les améliorations dont elle est susceptible, par M. Guernon de Ranville,... Caen: A. Le Roy. 1819. p. 115.
- Journal d'un ministre. Oeuvre posthume du comte de Guernon-Ranville, ancien membre de l'académie des sciences, arts et belles-lettres de Caen. Caen: F. Le Blanc-Hardel. 1873. p. 416.

The detailed diary that he kept during his ministry is the most useful surviving guide to the way in which Charles X and his government were thinking in the months that led up to the revolution of 1830.
