= Saint-Laurent-des-Autels =

- Part of Orée-d'Anjou
- Location of Saint-Laurent-des-Autels
- Location within France Location within Pays de la Loire
- Coordinates: 47°17′16″N 1°11′23″W
- Country: France
- Region: Pays de la Loire
- Department: Maine-et-Loire
- Arrondissement: Cholet
- Canton: La Pommeraye
- Commune: Orée-d'Anjou
- Area^{1}: 18.55 km^{2} (7.16 sq mi)
- Elevation: 92 m (302 ft)
- Highest elevation: 106 m (348 ft)
- Lowest elevation: 25 m (82 ft)
- Population (2022): 2,248
  - Density: 121.2/km^{2} (313.9/sq mi)
- Time zone: UTC+01:00 (CET)
  - Summer (DST): UTC+02:00 (CEST)
- Postal code: 49270
- ^{1} French Land Register data, which excludes lakes, ponds, glaciers > 1 km^{2} (0.386 sq mi or 247 acres) and river estuaries.

Saint-Laurent-des-Autels (French pronunciation: [sɛ̃ loʁɑ̃ de.z‿otɛl]) is a former commune in the Maine-et-Loire department in western France. On 15 December 2015, it was merged into the new commune Orée-d'Anjou. Its population was 2,248 in 2022.

== See also ==
- Communes of the Maine-et-Loire department
