= Château de Guernon-Ranville =

Building in Ranville, France

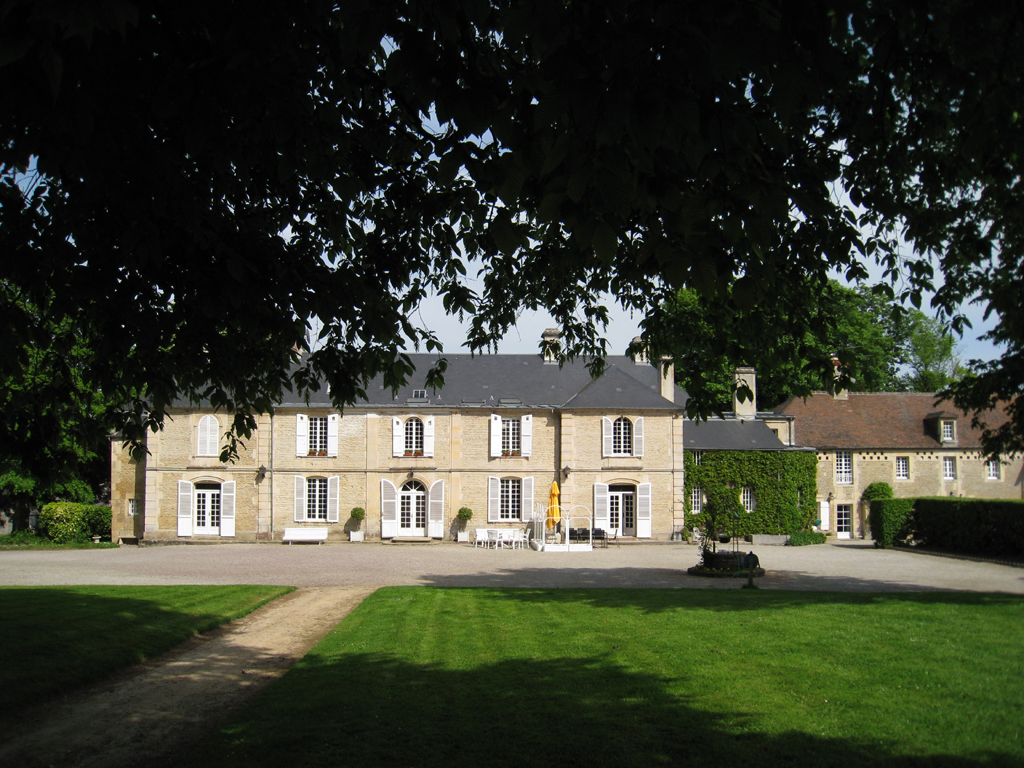
- Rear facade
- Interactive map of the Château de Guernon-Ranville area

General information
- Location: Ranville, Calvados, France
- Coordinates: 49.23085°N 0.26505°W

The Château de Guernon-Ranville (Castle of Guernon-Ranville) is located in the hamlet of Le Bas de Ranville in the commune of Ranville, in the Calvados department of Normandy in Northwestern France.

This private 18th-century domain carries the name of the family who were for a long period of time the proprietors of the château. It was once the home of a 19th-century minister, later the holiday resort of art patrons at the beginning of the 20th century as well as eventually a field hospital during the Allied landings in Normandy in 1944. The château now offers upscale self-catering holiday homes.

== History ==
The actual date of construction of the Château de Guernon-Ranville is not known. However, taking into account the architectural style of the château and notably the harmony of its facade, the château was built in the 18th century. Its name comes from the family who acquired the fief of Ranville in 1751 and who then added Ranville to their patronymic name, the result of which is Guernon-Ranville.

The origin of this family, which is one of the oldest to be found among Norman nobility, derives from:

- In the 8th century, Rollon, considered to be the first Duke of Normandy,
- In the 11th century, Robert de Guernon, one of the companions-at-arms of William the Conqueror during the invasion of the kingdom of England beginning in 1066. In Normandy, Robert possessed several fiefs and estates to which he lent his name. After the conquest of England, William the Conqueror gave Robert more than 50 manor houses, baronies and other domains in different counties of England. Robert settled in Stansted Mountfitchet in Essex, to the northeast of London. The site on which this castle is built is an important attraction for those who appreciate stately homes. Mountfitchet Castle is today classified as Historic Monument. Robert de Guernon is also an ancestor of the Cavendish family, one of the richest and most influential families of England from whom issue the Dukes of Devonshire.

The arms of the Guernon family are: "D'azur au leurre d'or, accompagné de deux molettes d'éperon en chef de même". Azure (the colour blue) symbolises justice and loyalty. The hunting decoy (leurre d'or in French) is the hood covering the head of birds of prey used for hunting. It is an emblem of the nobility whose first prerogative is the right to hunt. The molettes d'éperons a type of pierced-star symbol) are insignia of knighthood.

The château stayed in the Guernon-Ranville family for almost two centuries. It was significantly remodeled in the 19th century by its most illustrious proprietor, the count and minister Martial de Guernon-Ranville.

Blason of Guernon-Ranville

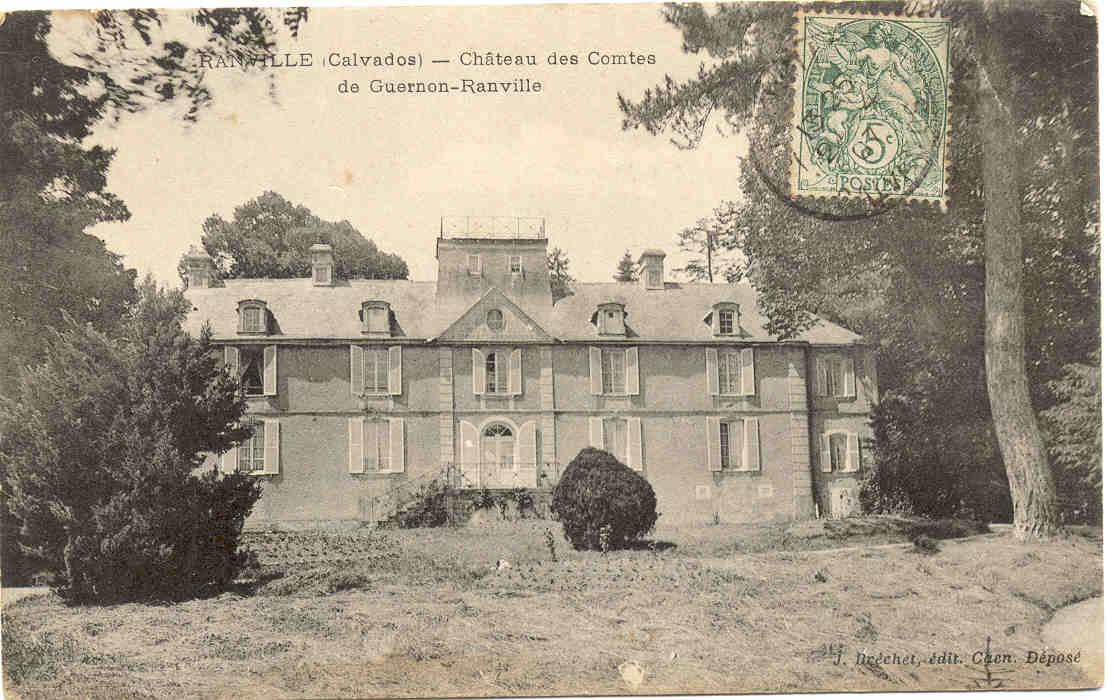
Postcard of the side of the château in the early 20th century

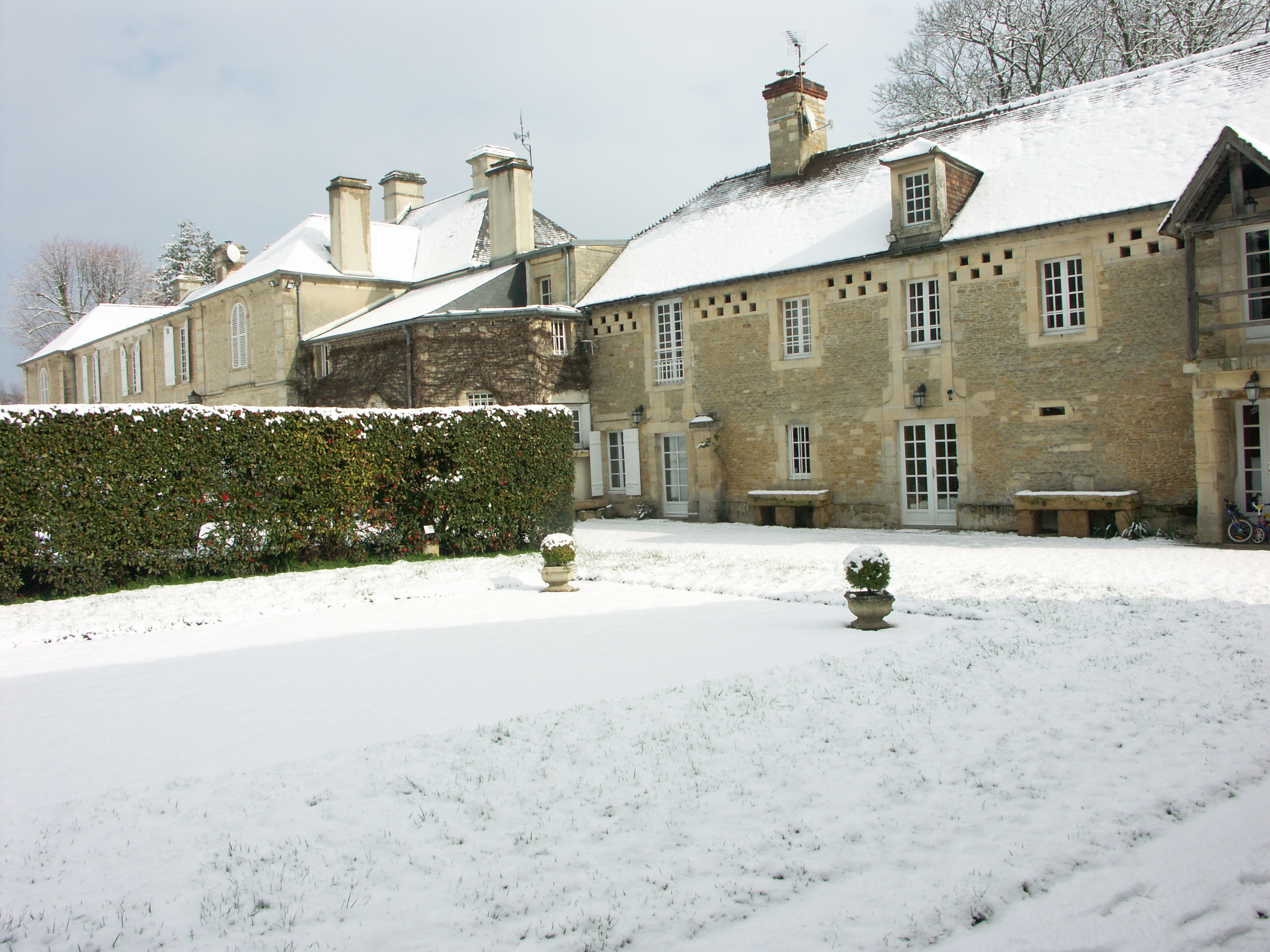
The château under the snow

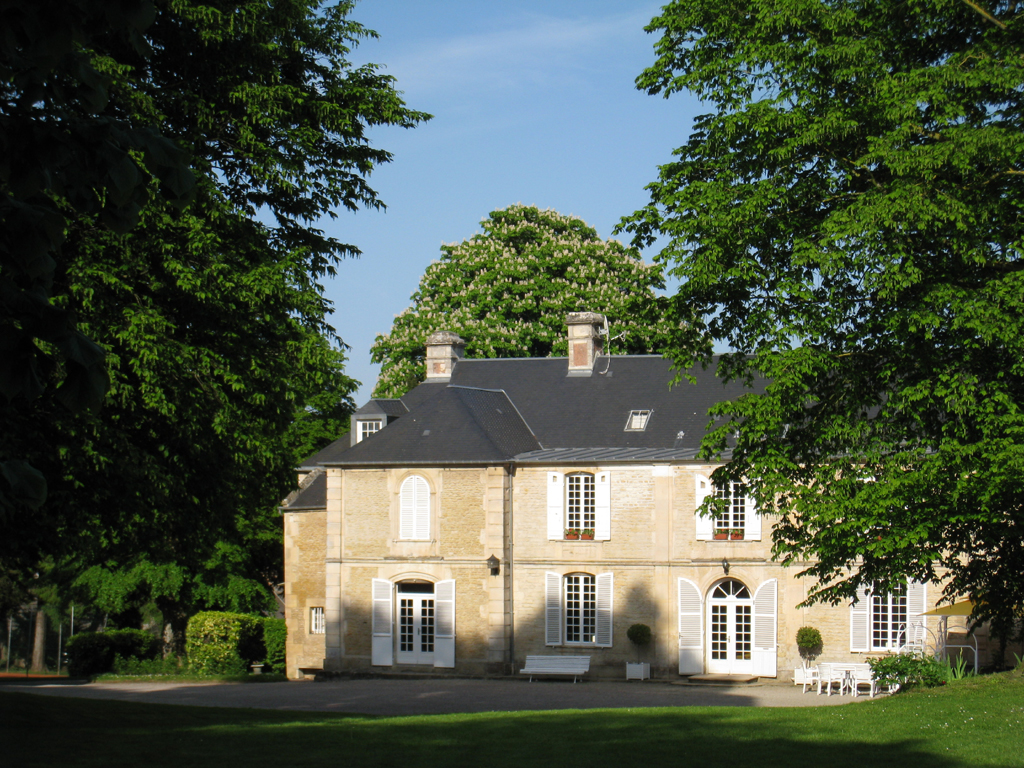
Partial view of the château

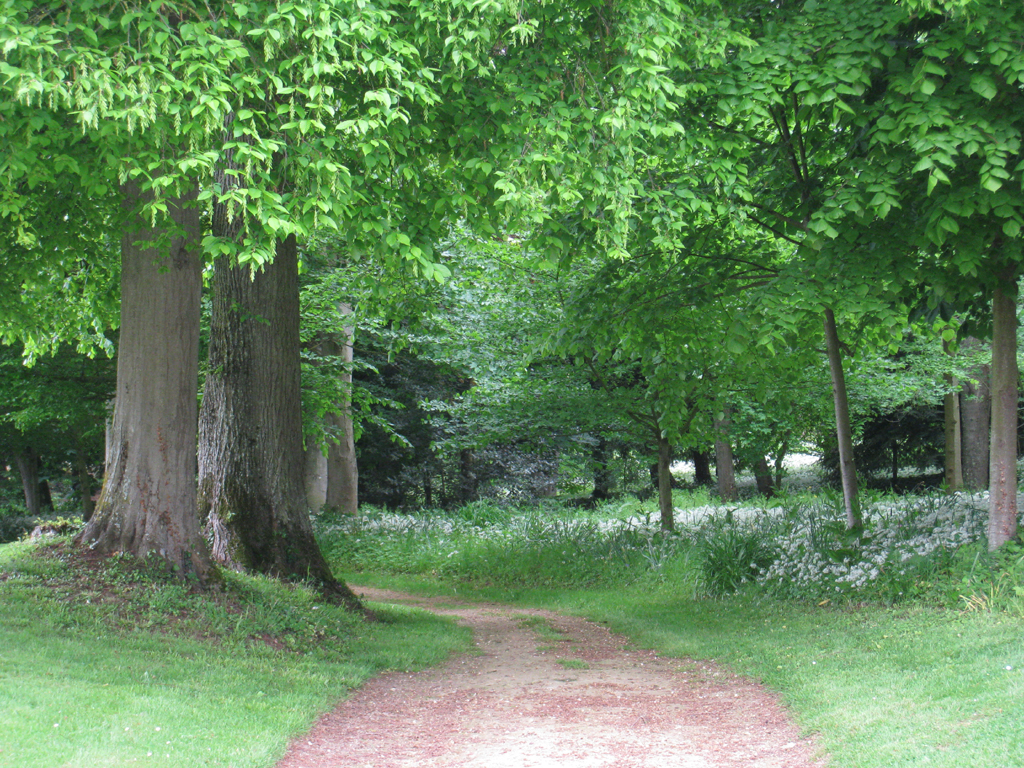
Park

== Home of a 19th century government minister ==
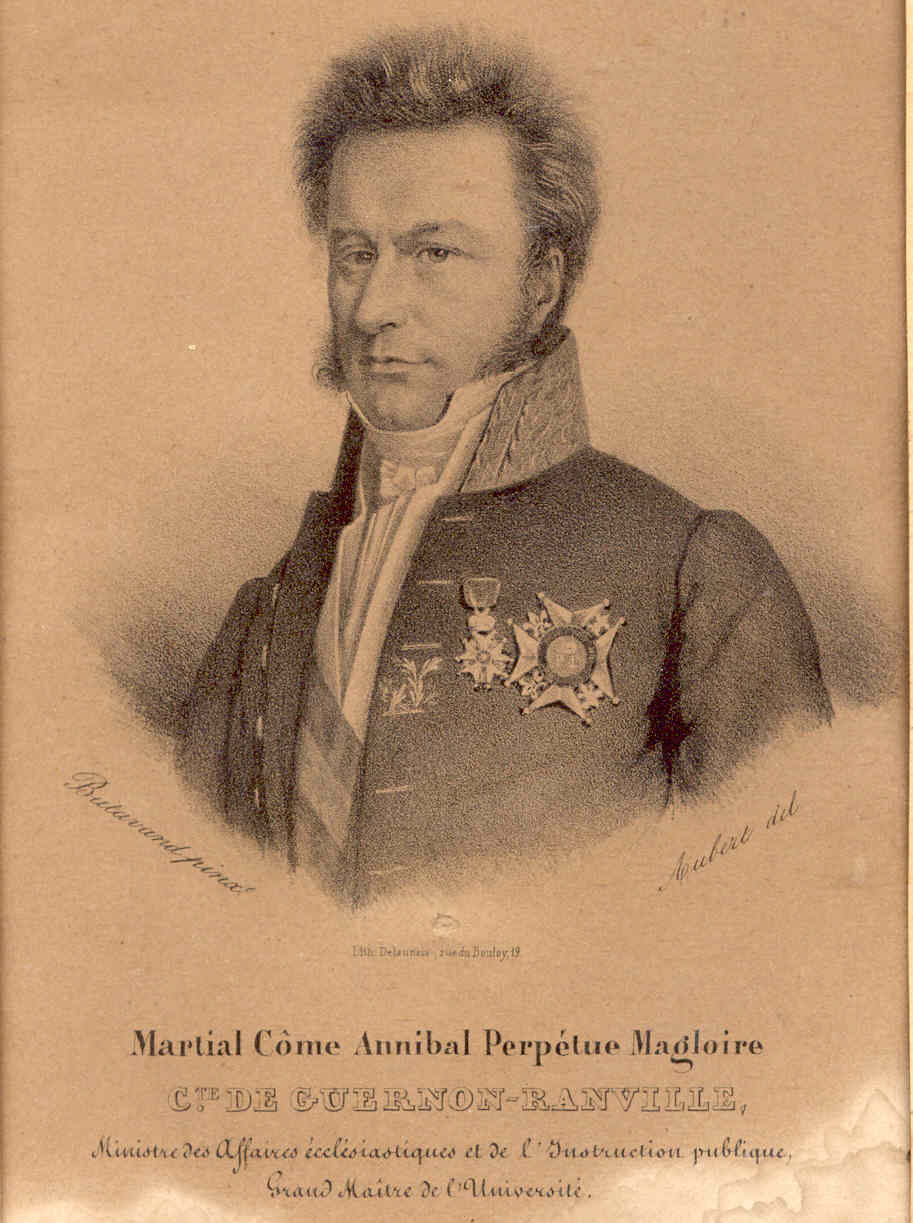
Count Martial de Guernon-Ranville (1787–1866)

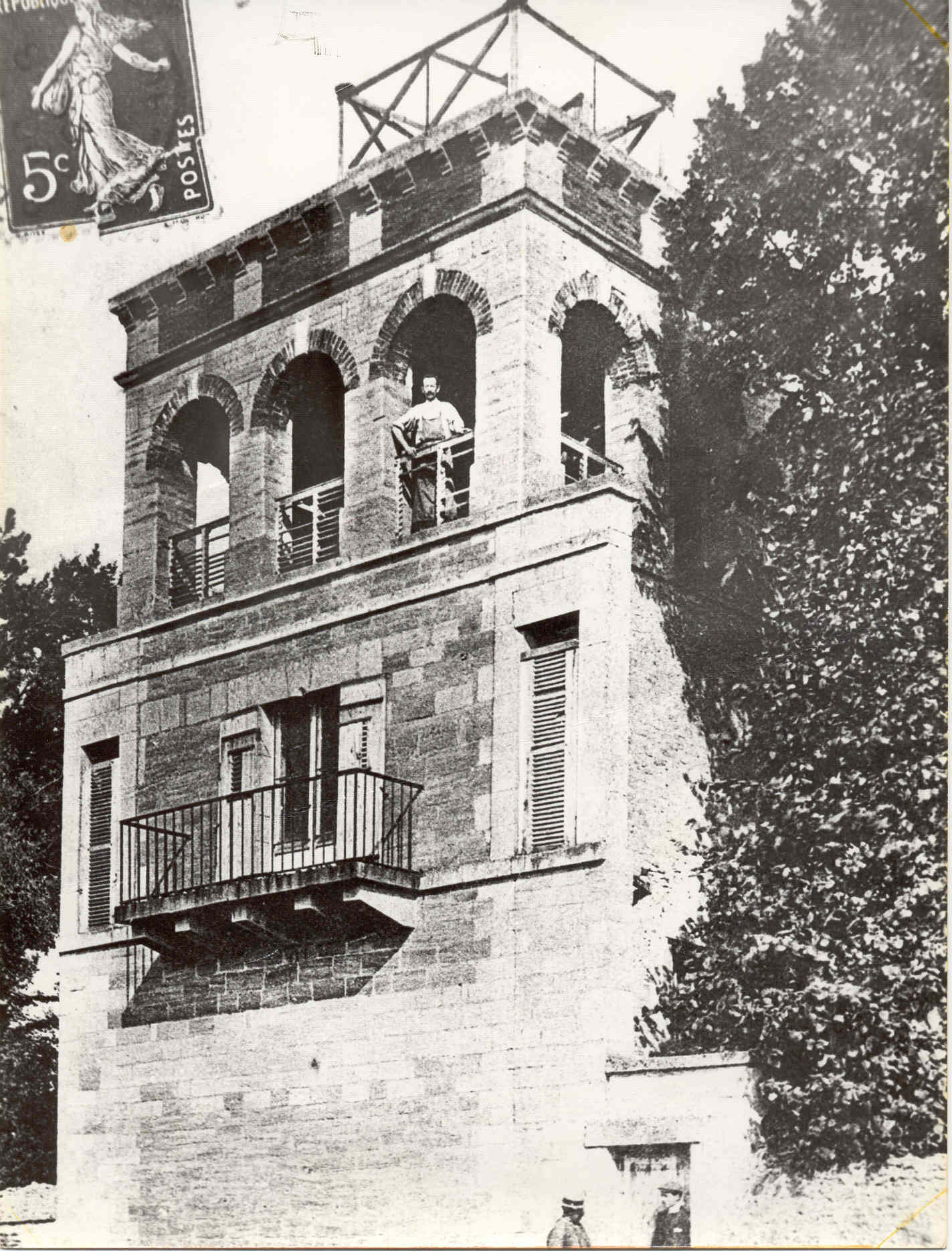
Belvédère

In 1818, Count Martial de Guernon-Ranville inherited the property of Ranville of which both his father and grandfather were 'Lord and Patron'. Martial began a career in the magistracy which led him to become a member of Parliament and a minister for the department of Ecclesiastic Affairs and Public Instruction (Ministre de l'Instruction publique et des Cultes) from 1829 to 1830 under Jules de Polignac.

Taking into consideration the numerous positions occupied throughout his professional life, it is unlikely that the Count lived in a permanent fashion at Ranville before 1836, the date from which he was given a compulsory order of residence. During his retirement, Martial reunited the two principal wings of the château, adding to one of the said wings an imposing gallery. This modern addition rendered independent rooms until then opening one upon the other ("en enfilade" in French), a system of circulation through houses and other buildings still prevalent in the 18th century. The Count arranged for moldings and parquet flooring in different fine woods in the left wing which was reserved for the master of the house, family and guests.

Located in the right wing of the château was found those rooms necessary to house servants, kitchens and stables mews. One room served for the storage of fruits on large flat wooden shelves, built on an incline. In the kitchen area was a vast chimney as well as a larder for the preservation of perishable food items. The cavities located in the uppermost part of this wing were most certainly a pigeonry.

The outbuildings of the château consist of a barn for grain storage, a cellar, a workshop for the blacksmith as well as a wine press and a farmyard.

Within the walls of the domain was also, most likely, a small, private chapel as well as a belvedere at the end of the park. This belvedere, no longer in existence, was an astonishing structure four flights high in which the Count stored his collection of precious stones. It is said that from the top of the belvedere one could see all the way to the sea by way of the Caen road. In this same era, there was a walled road which led from the château to the private crypt of the Guernons which is found alongside the church of Ranville in the centre of the village. In this enclosure, which belongs nowadays to the village, one can see sculpted family vaults of the Count and his wife.

Other records recount the existence of a subterranean passage going all the way to Caen but no trace of this passage has been found.

== Holiday resort of patrons of the arts of the 20th century ==
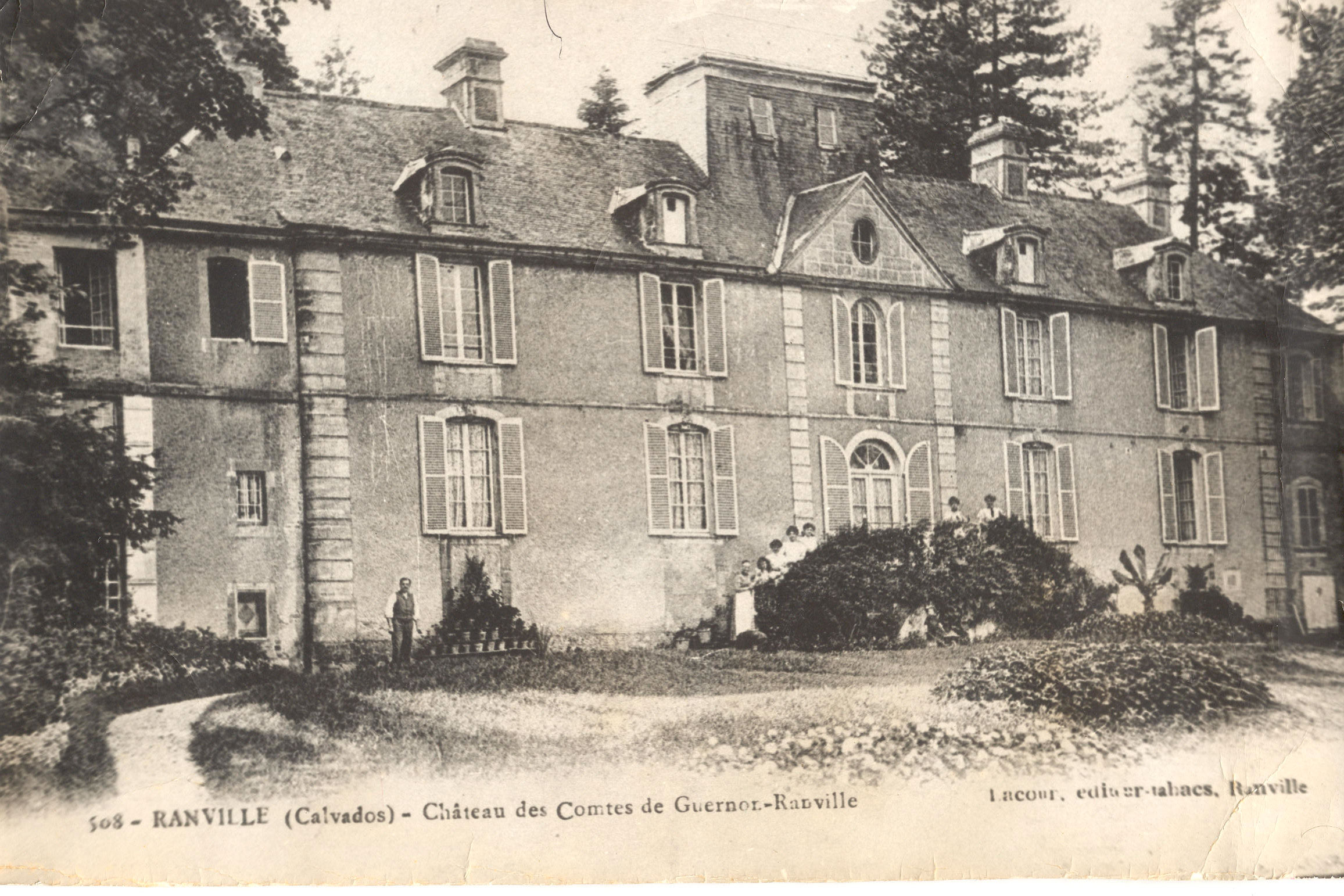
Caption: "Château des Comtes de Guernon-Ranville"

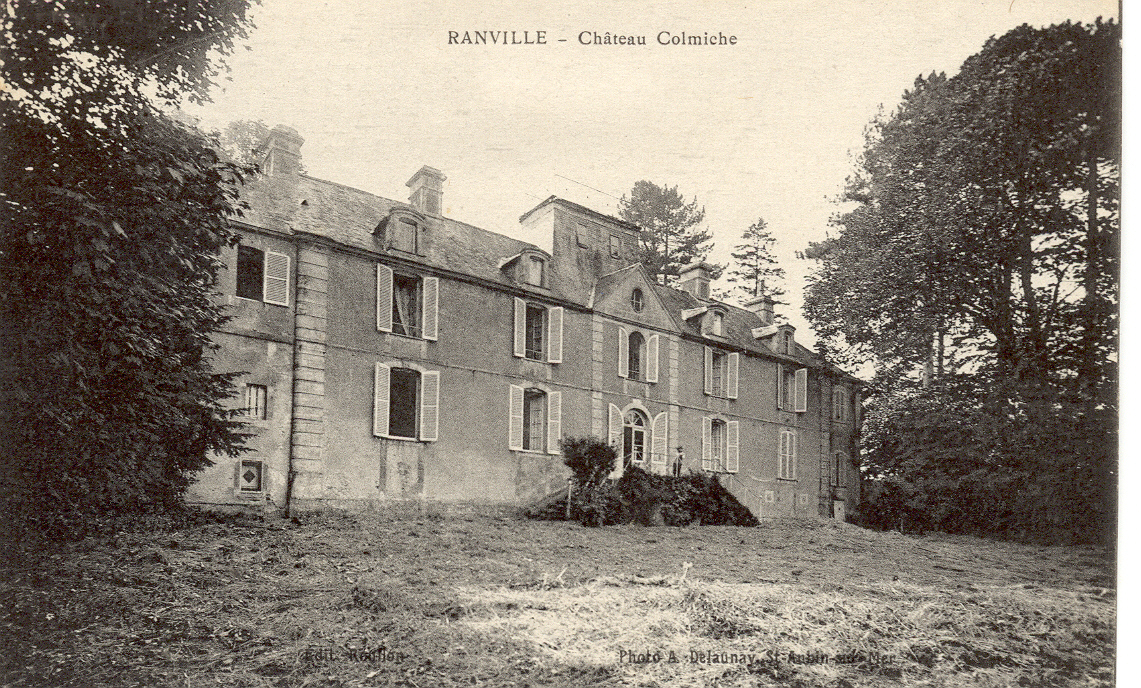
Caption: "Château Colmiche"

At the beginning of the 20th century appear the very first postcards representing the "Château des Comtes de Guernon-Ranville". These cards are the work of small local publishers and are taken from photographs showing the principal facade of the château with its flight of steps and a promontory above a part of the barn, no longer in existence, which must have served as an observatory.

At this time, the château belonged to a great-grandniece of the Count of Guernon-Ranville, Yvonne Colmiche. The château was thus also photographed under the name of "Château Colmiche". No longer permanently inhabited by this descendant of the Count, the property was rented to a succession of tenants, among whom figure Alexandre Natanson, editor of La Revue Blanche (The White Review). Brother-in-law of the celebrated Misia, muse of fashionable and artistic Paris, as well as of the actress Marthe Mellot, he was also a patron and friend of great artistes of the era, including, among others, the painters Pierre Bonnard, Paul Signac, Henri de Toulouse-Lautrec and Pierre-Auguste Renoir.

In her book Le Pain Polka (The Polka Bread), Annette Vaillant, daughter of Marthe Mellot and niece of Alexandre Natanson, retells childhood memories of the château of Ranville where she joined her family several summers. She makes reference of the disposition of rooms still in existence today, such as the large drawing room "where one always feels cold with that portrait of Napoleon shining as brilliantly as the parquet floor and the piano", the billiard room "with its high bench seats and the balls which roll soundlessly, clicking against one another" and also the small drawing room. Of the exterior of the château, Vaillant describes the belvedere "which dominates the roadway", the hothouse which has since disappeared "where hang from the roof warm grapes not yet ripe", the stone steps of the flight of steps, the first cyclamens which scatter about the lawn at the end of summer, as well as "the walkway of dahlias running along the other side of the tennis court".

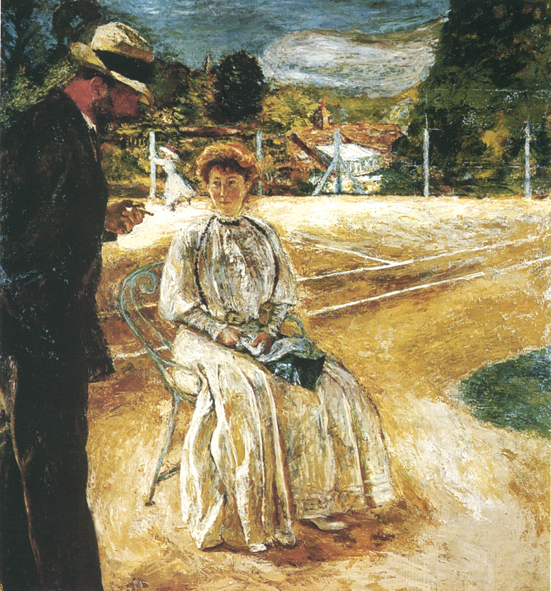
Le Tennis, painting by Édouard Vuillard, 1907

Édouard Vuillard painted this tennis court in 1907. A familiar face in the circle of the Natanson family, the painter was on holiday a few kilometres from Ranville, at the Château-Rouge of Amfreville. Le Tennis is a very large painting and was notably exposed in Paris at the 1912 Salon d'Automne and later at the Musée des Arts Décoratifs in 1938. Belonging for a long time to the Natanson family, the painting then left France for the United States where it was acquired by renowned art dealer by the name of Howard Young, an associate of Francis Lenn Taylor, Elizabeth Taylor's father. Le Tennis was later offered for sale by Sotheby's of New York in 1985.

Should one refer to the proposal of Anna de Noailles who said that "Monsieur Vuillard paints all that he sees", particularly during his years of realism, the background of the work tells that at that point in time, the property was not as yet defined by walls. The notarial act relating to the sale of the château between the First and Second World Wars to the Countess of Gramedo mentions "a property comprising a château, outbuildings, an orangery, a hothouse as well as a kitchen garden and a park in front of and behind the château, all of which is enclosed by walls".

== Field hospital during the Normandy landings in 1944 ==
During the Second World War, the château which had belonged since 1933 to the honorary president of the Court of Appeal of Paris, Monsieur Jozon, was requisitioned by the German occupation army in order to house members of the Organisation Todt.

During the night of 5 to 6 June 1944, three officers who were part of this organisation, apparently asleep in their rooms, were made prisoners by Allied troops. The château and its outbuildings were immediately transformed into a field hospital known as "Main Dressing Station" under the command of the 225th Parachute Field Ambulance. This medical intervention unit, composed of ten officers and somewhere around 100 men was under the 5th brigade of the 6th Airborne Division. It was operated under the command of Lieutenant-Colonel Bruce Harvey who had amongst others, already formed a medical outpost at the Café Gondrée located next to Pegasus Bridge.

On the roof of the château, a large cloth was spread, bearing the emblem of the Red Cross to indicate the presence of medical services. This effort, however, stopped neither mortar fire nor enemy bombing, the result damaging most notably a part of the outbuildings serving as a canteen to the unit. Nearly 400 wounded were treated in the first days, the most seriously wounded evacuated by sea to England. The two surgery teams, poorly equipped as they were, also performed more than 43 delicate operations.

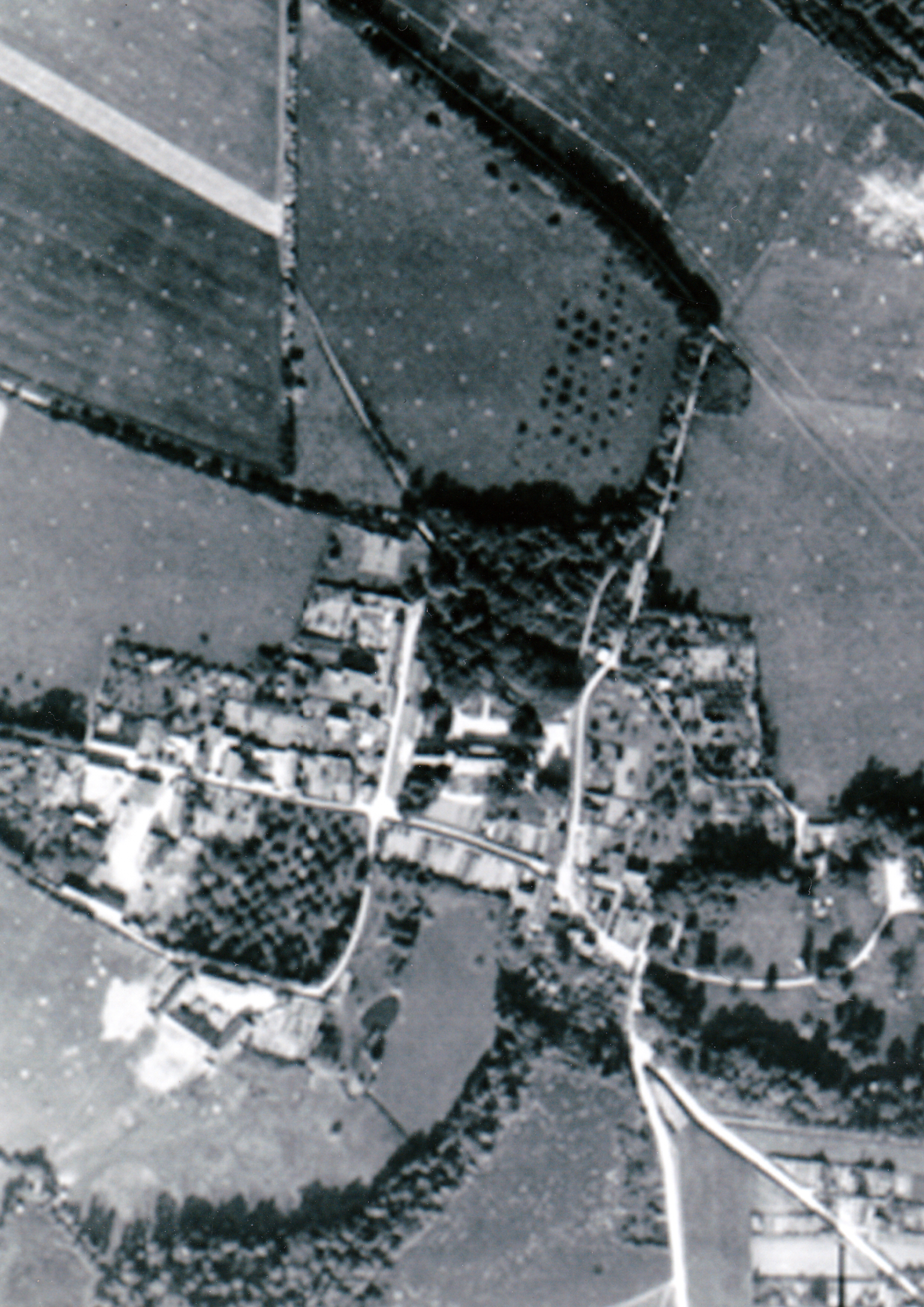
1944 aerial picture showing 'le Bas de Ranville' and in particular the Château de Guernon-Ranville in the centre and its park

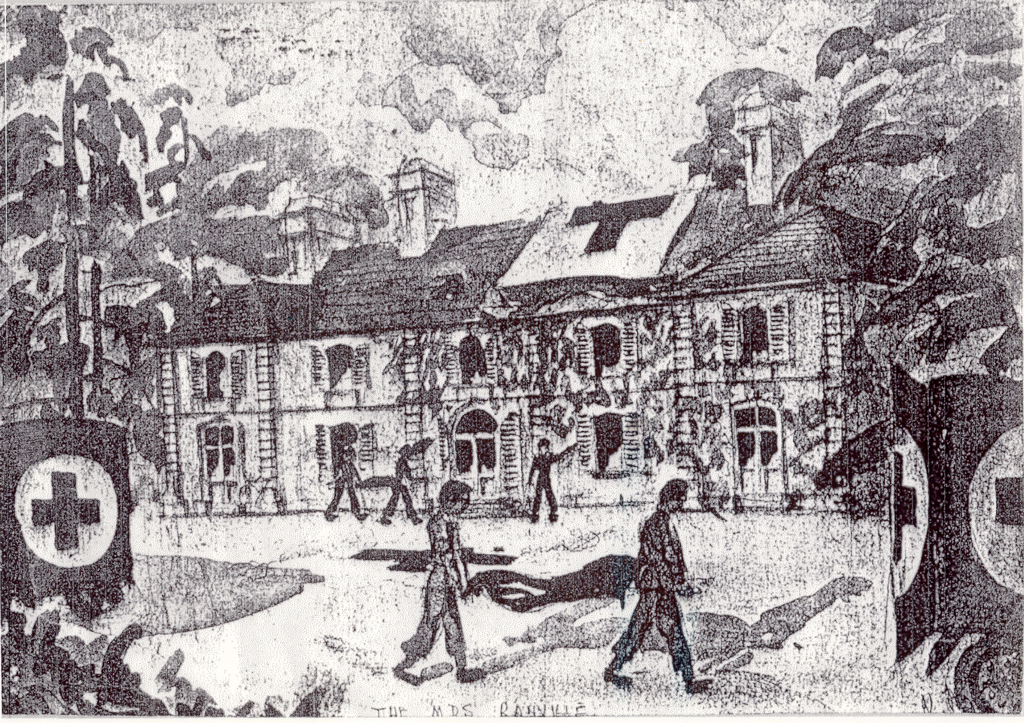
Copy of a drawing sketched in 1944 when the Château de Guernon-Ranville was a field hospital

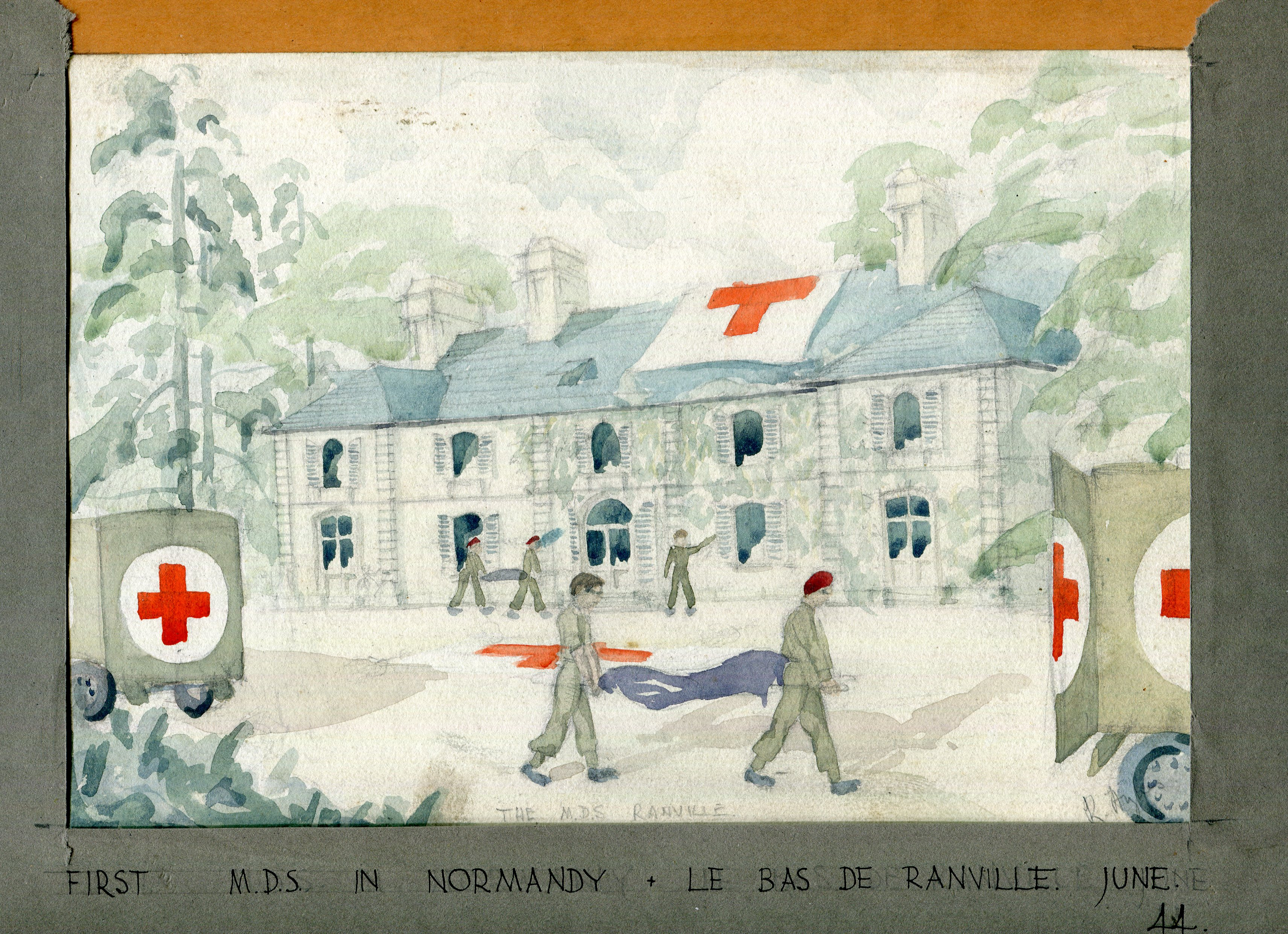
Colourised image

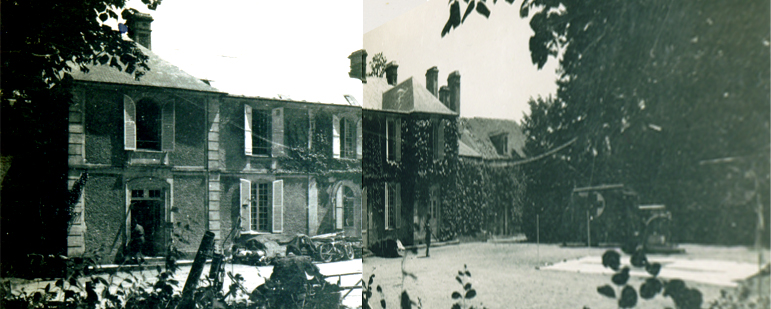
Two pictures put together showing the château in 1944, in which can be seen a sheet painted with a cross on the ground and which would have been visible to aviators in the skies above, in addition to military vehicles

== The self-catering holiday homes of the 21st century ==
Three upscale self-catering holiday homes are available and welcome to the vacation travelers. These apartments occupy part of the château and the old mews. Careful restoration conserves and highlights the original materials of the construction of the château: ceiling beams, antique floor tommettes, the period chimneys and walls made of quarried stone of Caen.

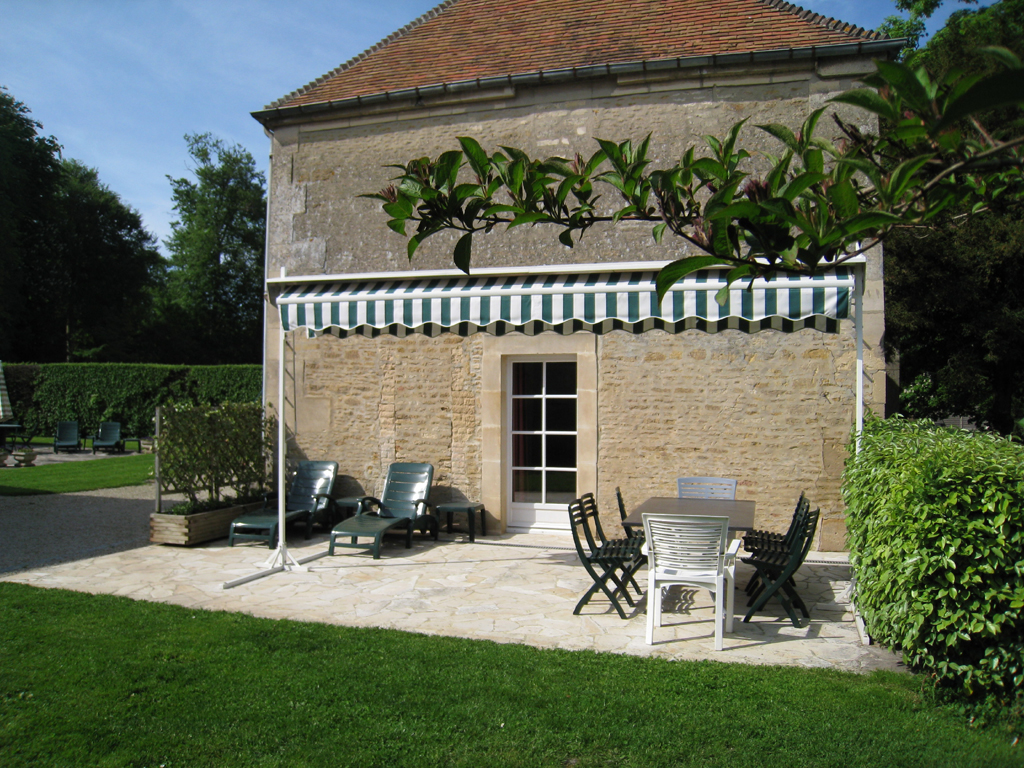
One of the homes

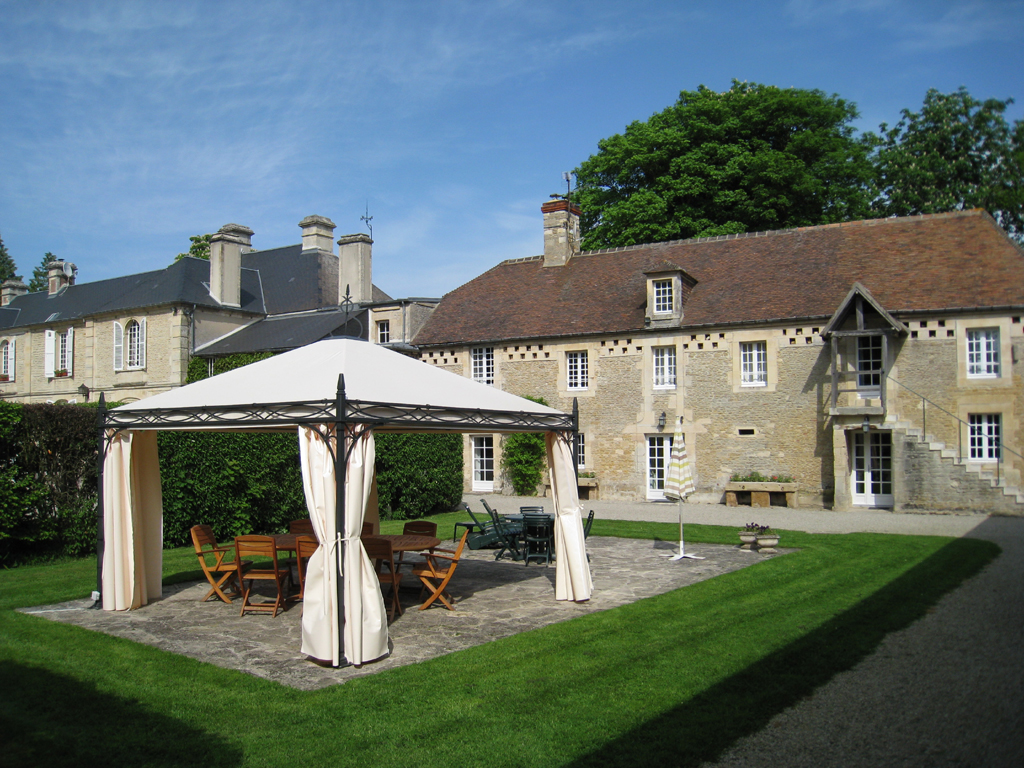
Another home

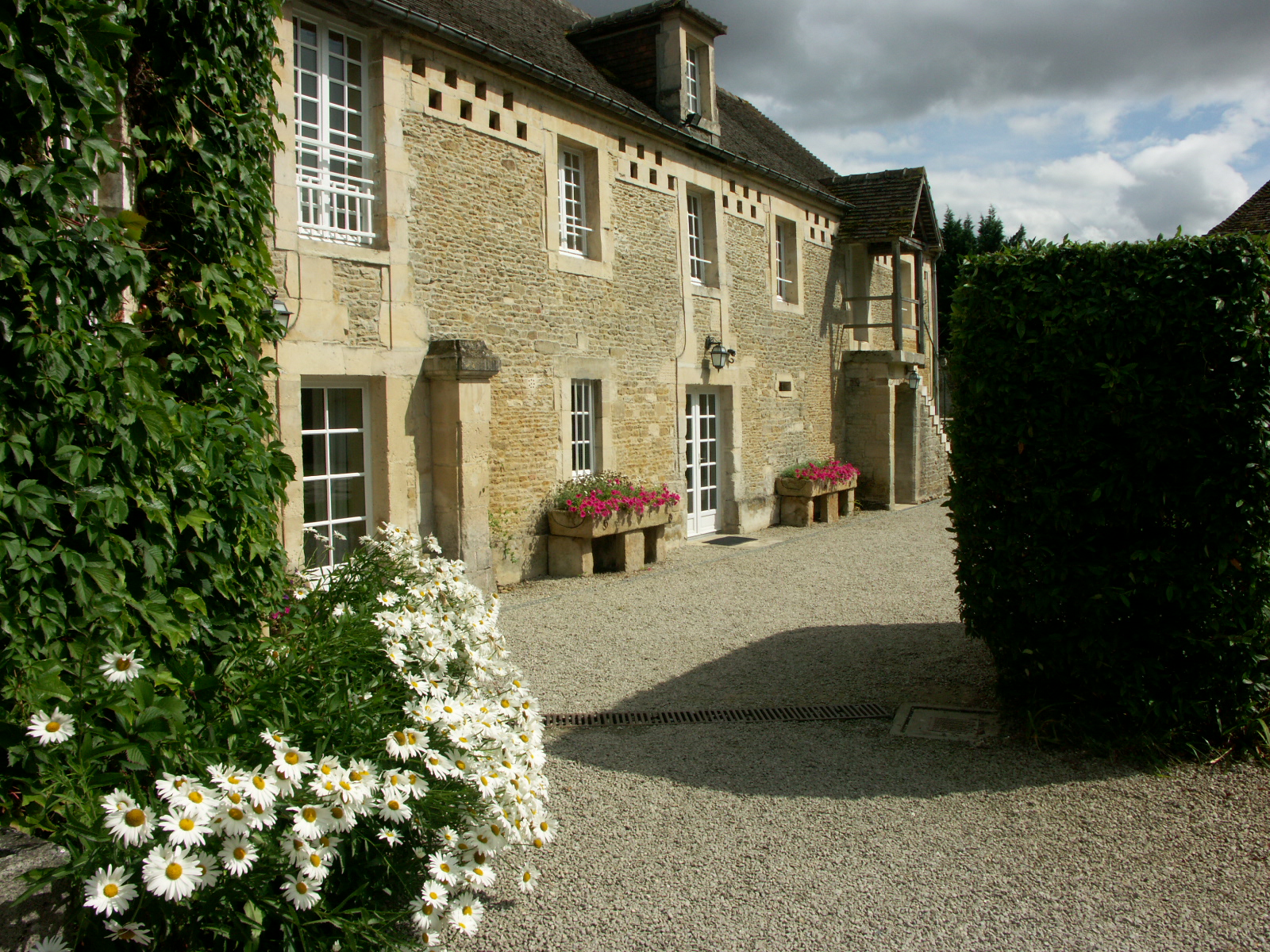
Château building

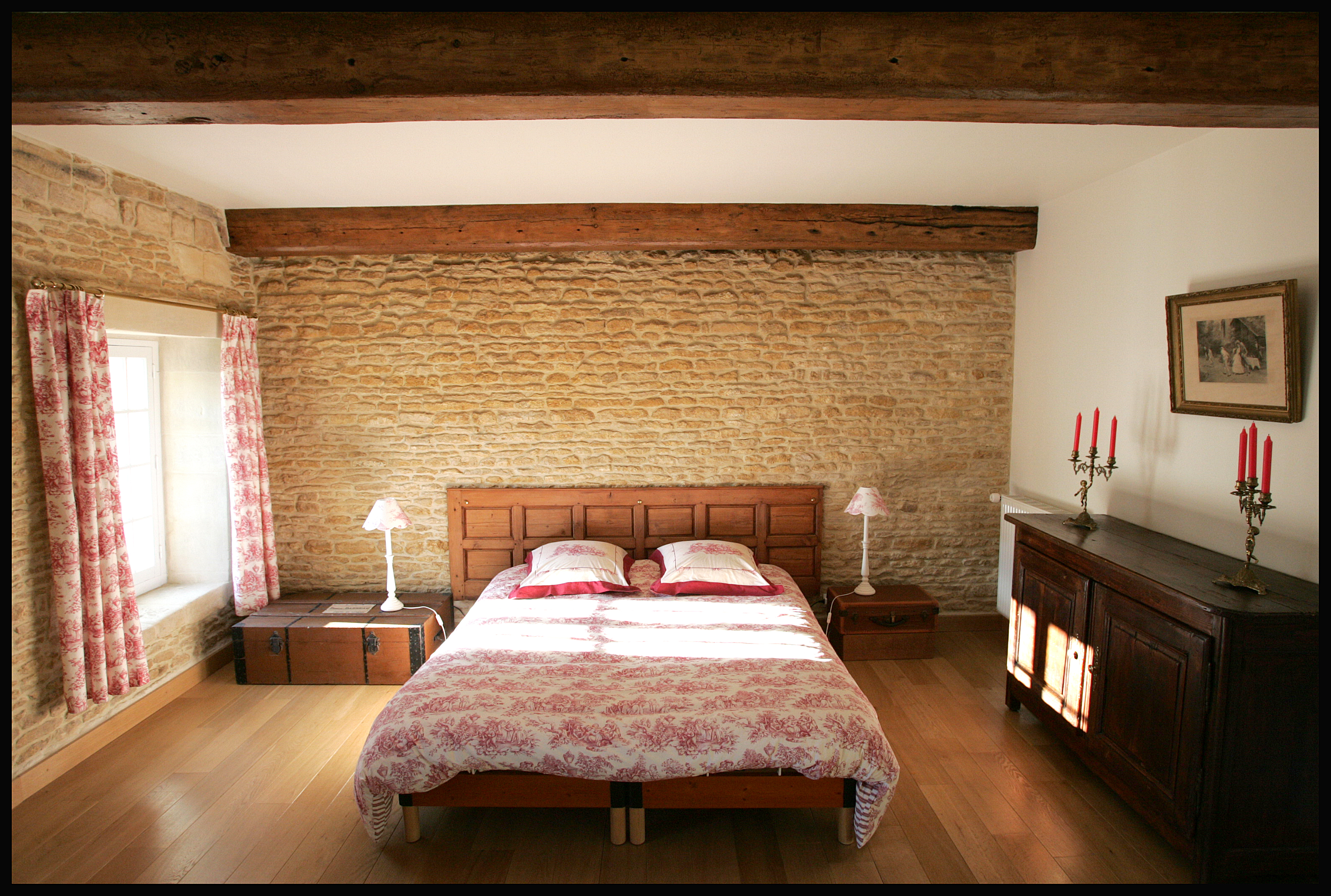
One of the rooms

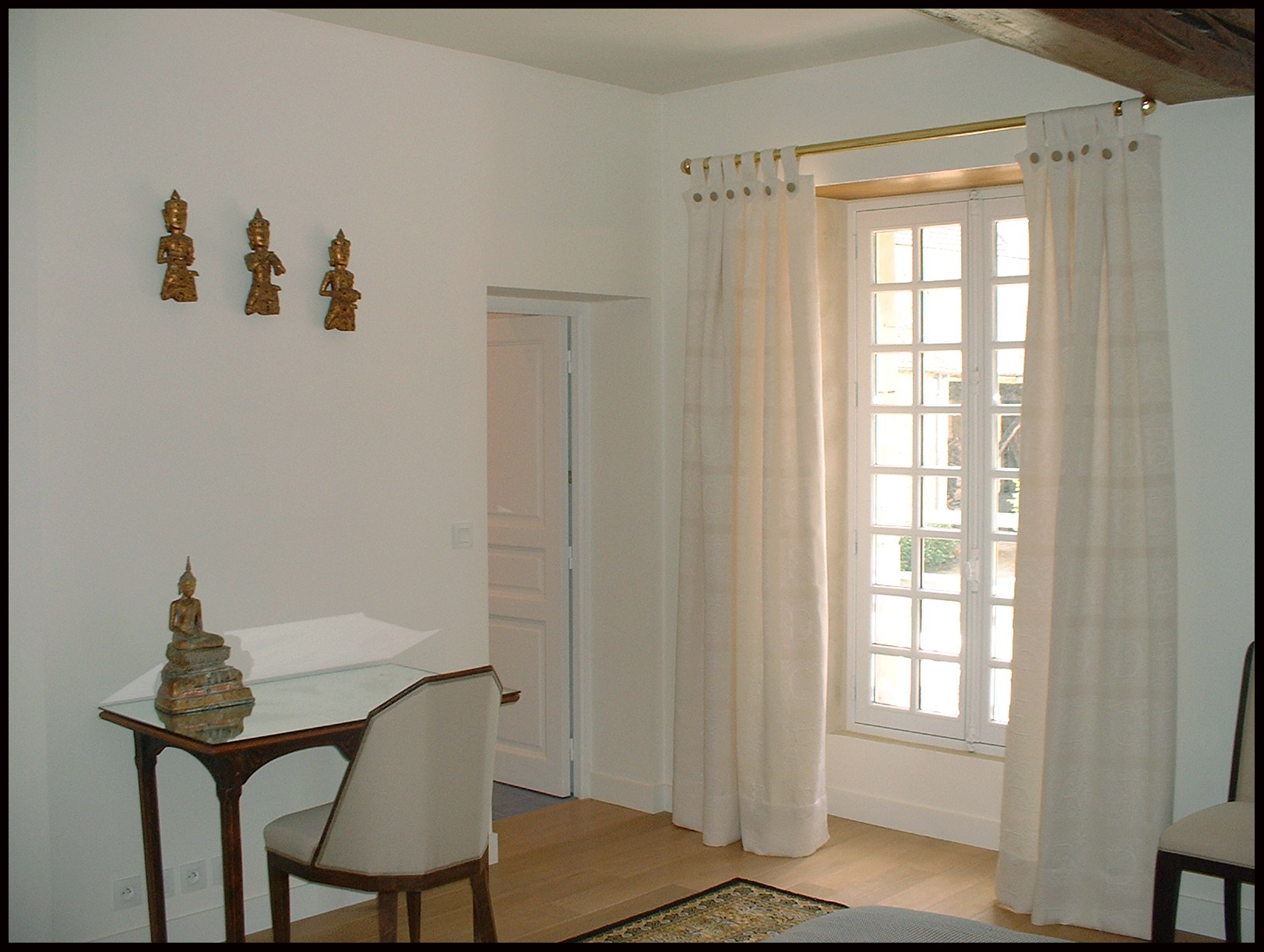
Another room

== Bibliography ==
- Raymond Monfaut, Recherche de Monfaut, Imprimerie de F. Poisson, Caen, seconde édition, 1818
- Guy Chamillard, Généralité de Caen. Recherche de la Noblesse faite par ordre du Roi (Louis XIV) en 1666 et années suivantes, Du Buisson de Courson, 1887–1889
- Philip Morant, The History and Antiquities of the County of Essex, éditeur T. Osborne, J. Whiston, S. Baker, L. Davis & C. Reymers, B. White, Londres, 1768, 2 volumes
- Répertoire des anciennes demeures françaises, Le Calvados I, Arrondissement de Caen, Éditions des anciennes demeures françaises, Paris, 1975
- Julien Travers, M. Le Comte de Guernon-Ranville et le journal de son ministère, imprimeur F. Le Blanc-Hardel, Caen, 1866
- Gaël de Rohan-Chabot, Ranville autrefois, Imprimeur R. Lebrun, Caen, 1983
- Annette Vaillant, Le Pain Polka, Mercure de France, 1974
- Paul-Henri Bourrelier, La Revue blanche, une génération dans l’engagement, 1890-1905, Fayard, Paris, 2007
- Antoine Salomon et Guy Cogeval, Vuillard, critical catalogue of paintings and pastels, Skira Wildenstein Institute, 2003
- Lieutenant-Colonel Howard N. Cole, On wing of healing, the story of the Airborne Medical Services 1940-1960, William Blackwood & Sons, 1963

== See also ==
- List of châteaux in Normandy
