= Orée-d'Anjou =

- Commune
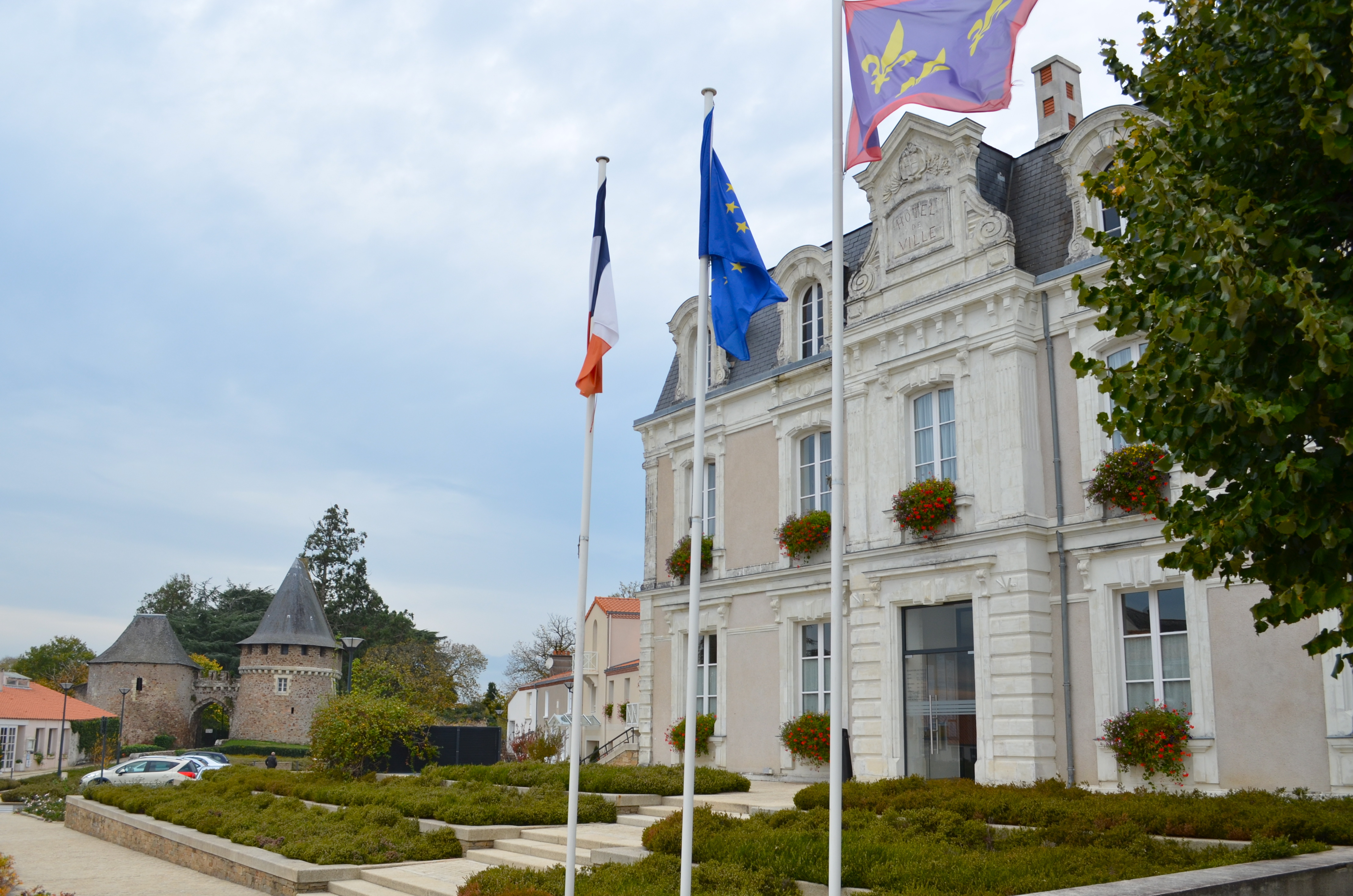
- The town hall of Champtoceaux with the towers of the château in the background
- Location of Orée-d'Anjou
- Location within France Location within Pays de la Loire
- Coordinates: 47°20′13″N 1°15′50″W
- Country: France
- Region: Pays de la Loire
- Department: Maine-et-Loire
- Arrondissement: Cholet
- Canton: Mauges-sur-Loire
- Intercommunality: Mauges Communauté

Government
  - Mayor (2022–2026): André Martin
- Area^{1}: 156.34 km^{2} (60.36 sq mi)
- Population (2023): 17,162
  - Density: 109.77/km^{2} (284.31/sq mi)
- Time zone: UTC+01:00 (CET)
  - Summer (DST): UTC+02:00 (CEST)
- INSEE/Postal code: 49069 /49270, 49530
- ^{1} French Land Register data, which excludes lakes, ponds, glaciers > 1 km^{2} (0.386 sq mi or 247 acres) and river estuaries.

Orée-d'Anjou (French pronunciation: [ɔʁe dɑ̃ʒu], literally Edge of Anjou) is a commune in the Maine-et-Loire department of western France. Champtoceaux is the municipal seat.

== History ==
It was established on 15 December 2015 and consists of the former communes of Bouzillé, Champtoceaux, Drain, Landemont, Liré, Saint-Christophe-la-Couperie, Saint-Laurent-des-Autels, Saint-Sauveur-de-Landemont and La Varenne.

== Population ==
Historical population
Year	Pop.	±% p.a.
1968	9,678	—
1975	10,315	+0.91%
1982	11,153	+1.12%
1990	11,863	+0.77%
1999	12,296	+0.40%
2007	14,440	+2.03%
2012	15,824	+1.85%
2017	16,413	+0.73%
2023	17,162	+0.75%
Populations of the area corresponding with the commune of Orée-d'Anjou at 1 January 2025. Source: INSEE

== See also ==
- Communes of the Maine-et-Loire department
