= Ranville war cemetery =

WWII CWGC cemetery in France

Ranville War Cemetery
- Commonwealth War Graves Commission
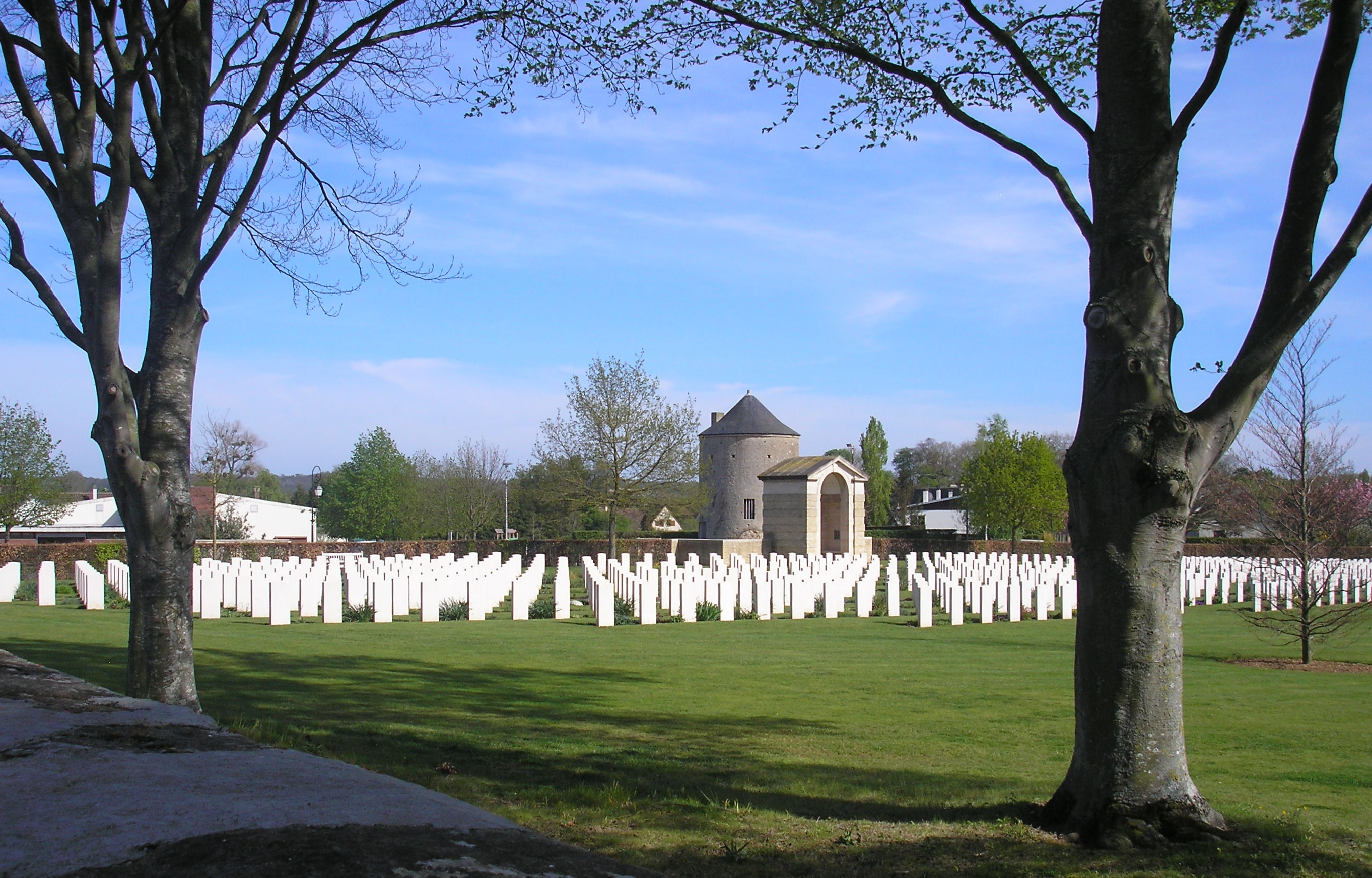
- Ranville War Cemetery
- Used for those deceased 1944
- Established: 1944
- Location: 49°13′52″N 0°15′28″W near Ranville, Calvados, France
- Designed by: Philip Hepworth
- Total burials: 2,560
- Unknowns: 2

Burials by nation
- Britain: 2,151 Canada: 76; Australia: 1 New Zealand: 1 Belgium: 1 France: 5 Poland: 1 Unknown Allied: 1 German: 322 Unknown: 1

Burials by war
- World War II

Ranville War Cemetery is a Second World War cemetery of Commonwealth soldiers in France, located in Ranville, 10 km (6.2 mi) north east of Caen, Normandy. The cemetery contains predominantly British soldiers killed during the early stages of the Battle of Normandy. A large proportion of those interred were members of the British 6th Airborne Division. The cemetery is maintained by the Commonwealth War Graves Commission.

== History ==
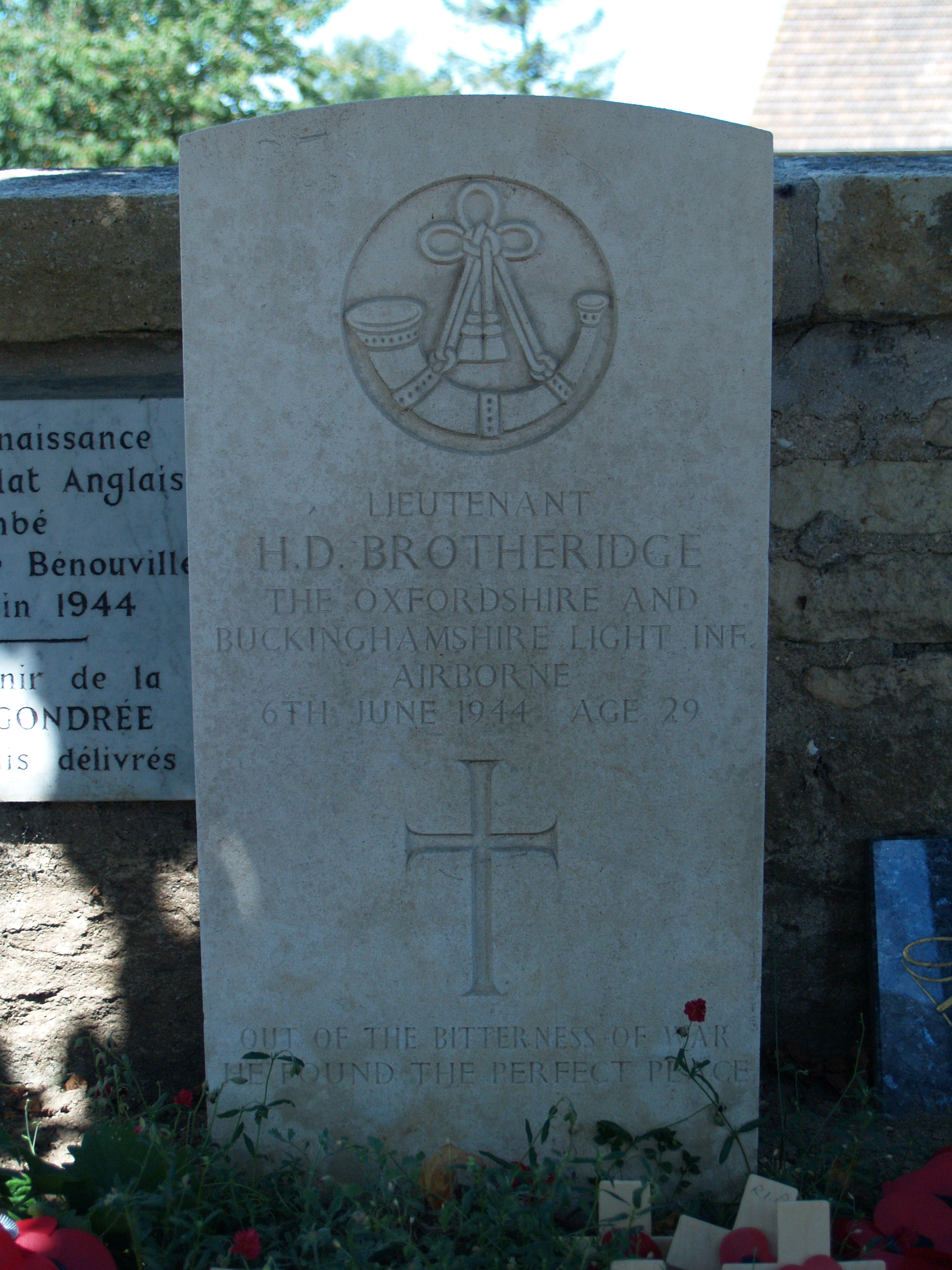
Grave of Lt. Den Brotheridge

Ranville was the first village to be liberated by elements of the British 6th Airborne Division on the morning of 6 June 1944 (D-Day) when the nearby (Pegasus Bridge) over the Caen Canal was attacked and captured. The cemetery contains the grave of Lieutenant Den Brotheridge - considered to be the first Allied death on D-Day.

The churchyard was immediately used to accommodate battlefield dead. Following the end of the war, the war cemetery was created which gathered field burials from locations including Amfreville, Colleville-sur-Mer, Colombelles, Houlgate and Villers-sur-Mer. Additional casualties were re-interred from grave sites in the Orne department.

== Architecture ==
Contained within the cemetery is a Cross of Sacrifice, a piece of architecture typical of memorials designed by the Commonwealth War Graves Commission. As is typical of war cemeteries in France, the grounds are beautifully landscaped and immaculately kept. The final interments were made in 1946.

== Location ==
Ranville is 10 km north-east of Caen.

== See also ==
- List of military cemeteries in Normandy
