= Bouzillé =

- Part of Orée-d'Anjou
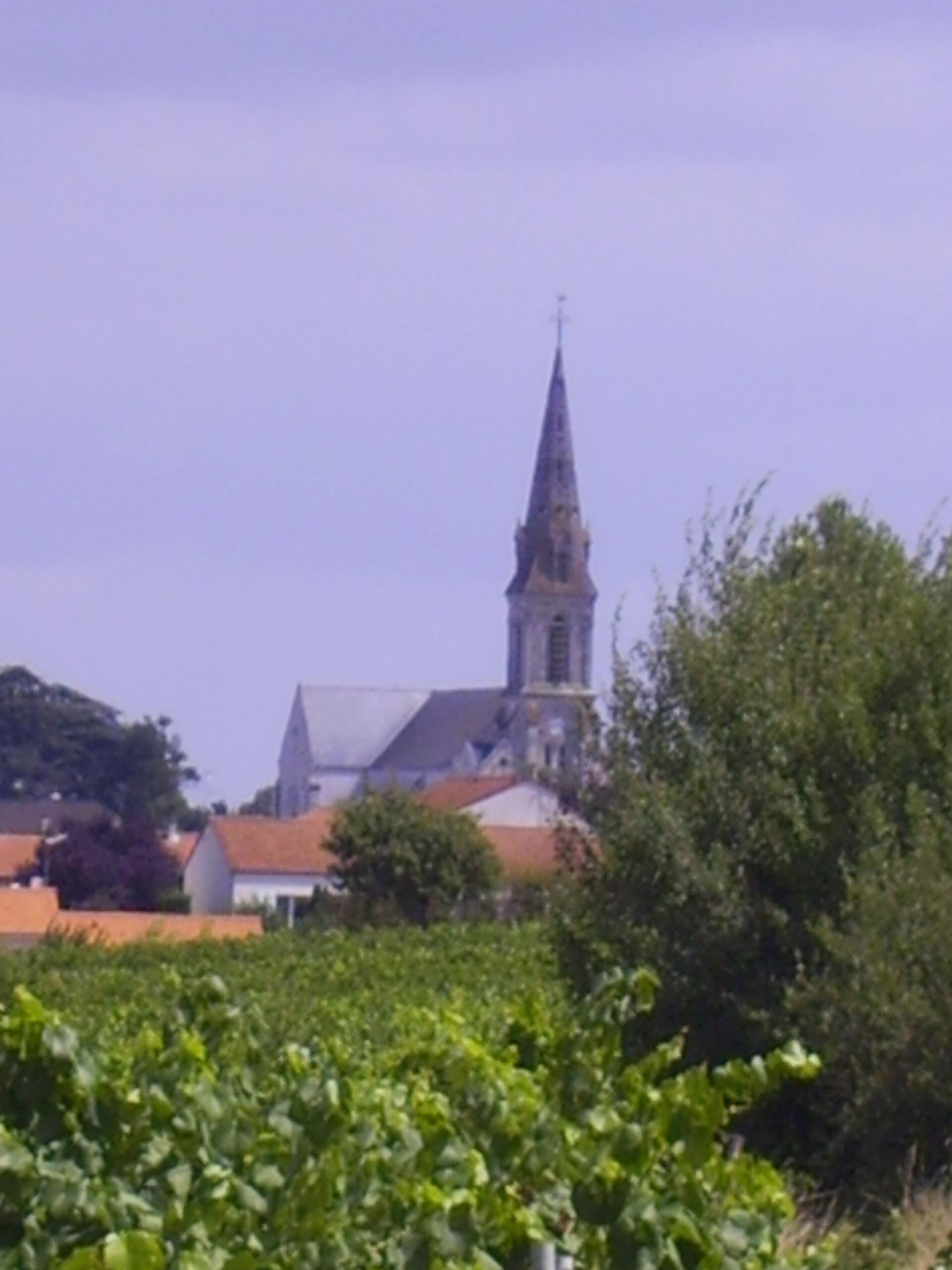
- Location of Bouzillé
- Location within France Location within Pays de la Loire
- Coordinates: 47°20′18″N 1°06′34″W
- Country: France
- Region: Pays de la Loire
- Department: Maine-et-Loire
- Arrondissement: Cholet
- Canton: La Pommeraye
- Commune: Orée-d'Anjou
- Area^{1}: 18.39 km^{2} (7.10 sq mi)
- Elevation: 89 m (292 ft)
- Highest elevation: 102 m (335 ft)
- Lowest elevation: 7 m (23 ft)
- Population (2022): 1,613
  - Density: 87.71/km^{2} (227.2/sq mi)
- Time zone: UTC+01:00 (CET)
  - Summer (DST): UTC+02:00 (CEST)
- Postal code: 49530
- ^{1} French Land Register data, which excludes lakes, ponds, glaciers > 1 km^{2} (0.386 sq mi or 247 acres) and river estuaries.

Bouzillé (French pronunciation: [buzije]) is a former commune in the Maine-et-Loire department in western France. On 15 December 2015, it was merged into the new commune Orée-d'Anjou.

== People from Bouzillé ==
- Paul Poupard (born 1930), Roman Catholic cardinal

== See also ==
- Communes of the Maine-et-Loire department
