= Saint-Christophe-la-Couperie =

- Part of Orée-d'Anjou
- Location of Saint-Christophe-la-Couperie
- Location within France Location within Pays de la Loire
- Coordinates: 47°15′18″N 1°10′48″W
- Country: France
- Region: Pays de la Loire
- Department: Maine-et-Loire
- Arrondissement: Cholet
- Canton: La Pommeraye
- Commune: Orée-d'Anjou
- Area^{1}: 8.29 km^{2} (3.20 sq mi)
- Elevation: 104 m (341 ft)
- Highest elevation: 104 m (341 ft)
- Lowest elevation: 74 m (243 ft)
- Population (2022): 808
  - Density: 97.5/km^{2} (252/sq mi)
- Time zone: UTC+01:00 (CET)
  - Summer (DST): UTC+02:00 (CEST)
- Postal code: 49270
- ^{1} French Land Register data, which excludes lakes, ponds, glaciers > 1 km^{2} (0.386 sq mi or 247 acres) and river estuaries.

Saint-Christophe-la-Couperie (French pronunciation: [sɛ̃ kʁistɔf la kupʁi]) is a former commune in the Maine-et-Loire department in western France. On 15 December 2015, it was merged into the new commune Orée-d'Anjou.

== See also ==
- Communes of the Maine-et-Loire department
