= Liré =

- Part of Orée-d'Anjou
- Location of Liré
- Location within France Location within Pays de la Loire
- Coordinates: 47°20′39″N 1°09′47″W
- Country: France
- Region: Pays de la Loire
- Department: Maine-et-Loire
- Arrondissement: Cholet
- Canton: La Pommeraye
- Commune: Orée-d'Anjou
- Area^{1}: 31.81 km^{2} (12.28 sq mi)
- Elevation: 48 m (157 ft)
- Highest elevation: 105 m (344 ft)
- Lowest elevation: 5 m (16 ft)
- Population (2022): 2,516
  - Density: 79.09/km^{2} (204.9/sq mi)
- Demonym(s): Liréen, Liréenne
- Time zone: UTC+01:00 (CET)
  - Summer (DST): UTC+02:00 (CEST)
- Postal code: 49530
- ^{1} French Land Register data, which excludes lakes, ponds, glaciers > 1 km^{2} (0.386 sq mi or 247 acres) and river estuaries.

Liré (French pronunciation: [liʁe]) is a former commune in the Maine-et-Loire department in western France. On 15 December 2015, it was merged into the new commune Orée-d'Anjou. It was the home of the sixteenth-century French poet Joachim du Bellay and is mentioned in his poem "Heureux qui, comme Ulysse, a fait un beau voyage".

The village is situated between Nantes and Angers. There is an annual fest called "Comme dans l'temps". It takes place every last Sunday of August.

Liré was a part of French Kingdom, from the moment that Anjou was considered to be in the French kingdom too.

In 2015 it had more than 2500 inhabitants. The soccer team of Liré is called Olympique Liré Drain. The team is on the PH division, it's the lowest division of the ligue atlantique de football, but it's higher than the district de Maine Et Loire. Liré's économy is mostly agricultural. It takes benefits of the proximity of Toyota's factory and all the services.

In the past Liré was called Lyré.

== See also ==
- Communes of the Maine-et-Loire department
