= Drain, Maine-et-Loire =

Drain
- Part of Orée-d'Anjou
- Location of Drain
- Location within France Location within Pays de la Loire
- Coordinates: 47°20′24″N 1°12′18″W
- Country: France
- Region: Pays de la Loire
- Department: Maine-et-Loire
- Arrondissement: Cholet
- Canton: La Pommeraye
- Commune: Orée-d'Anjou
- Area^{1}: 19.05 km^{2} (7.36 sq mi)
- Elevation: 90 m (300 ft)
- Highest elevation: 92 m (302 ft)
- Lowest elevation: 5 m (16 ft)
- Population (2022): 2,162
  - Density: 113.5/km^{2} (293.9/sq mi)
- Demonym(s): Drainois, Drainoise
- Time zone: UTC+01:00 (CET)
  - Summer (DST): UTC+02:00 (CEST)
- Postal code: 49530
- ^{1} French Land Register data, which excludes lakes, ponds, glaciers > 1 km^{2} (0.386 sq mi or 247 acres) and river estuaries.

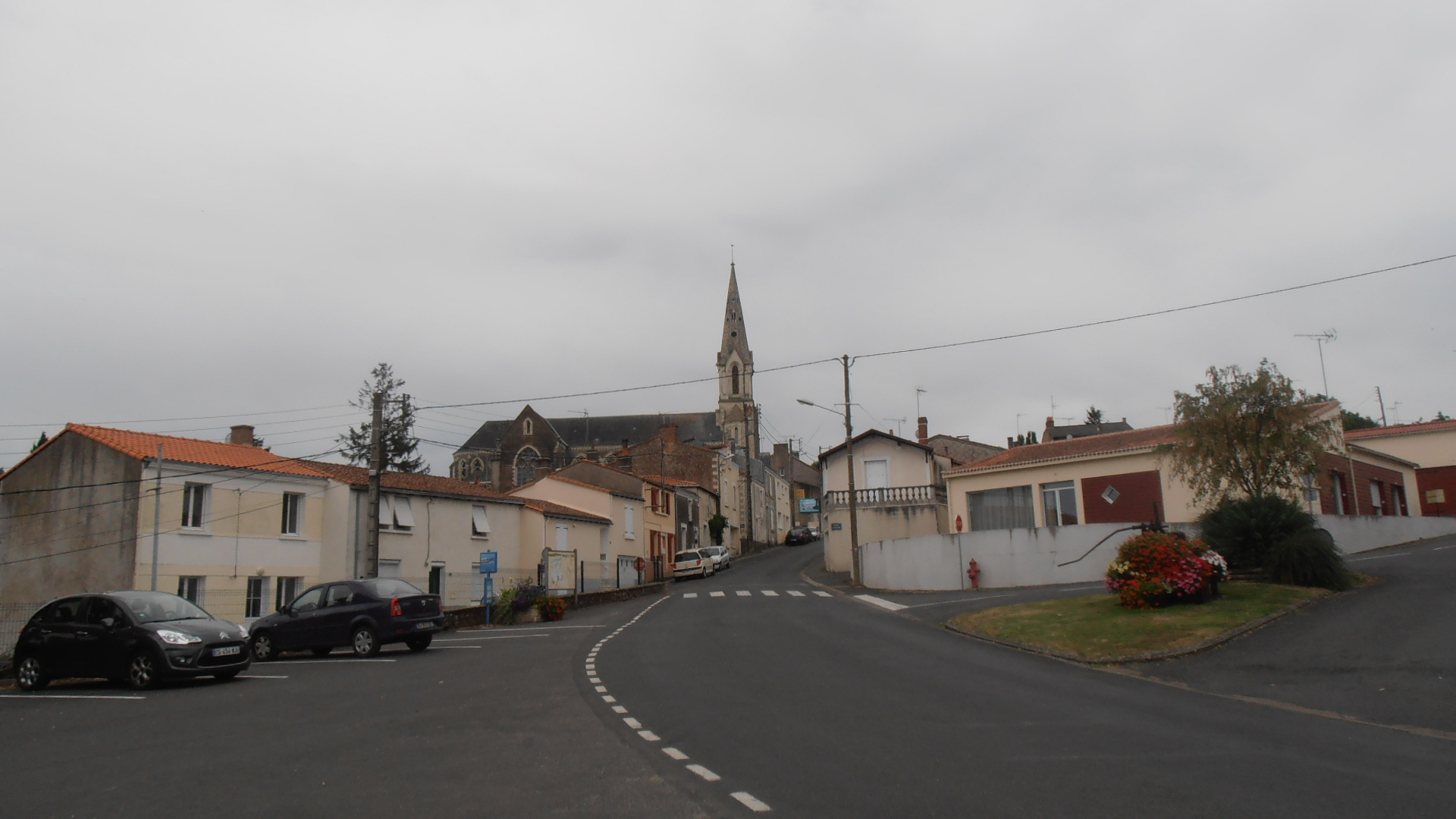
Drain

Drain (French pronunciation: [dʁɛ̃]) is a former commune in the Maine-et-Loire department in western France. On 15 December 2015, it was merged into the new commune Orée-d'Anjou.

== See also ==
- Communes of the Maine-et-Loire department
