= La Varenne, Maine-et-Loire =

La Varenne
- Part of Orée-d'Anjou
- Location of La Varenne
- Location within France Location within Pays de la Loire
- Coordinates: 47°18′48″N 1°19′15″W
- Country: France
- Region: Pays de la Loire
- Department: Maine-et-Loire
- Arrondissement: Cholet
- Canton: La Pommeraye
- Commune: Orée-d'Anjou
- Area^{1}: 14.19 km^{2} (5.48 sq mi)
- Elevation: 64 m (210 ft)
- Highest elevation: 82 m (269 ft)
- Lowest elevation: 1 m (3.3 ft)
- Population (2022): 1,837
  - Density: 129.5/km^{2} (335.3/sq mi)
- Time zone: UTC+01:00 (CET)
  - Summer (DST): UTC+02:00 (CEST)
- Postal code: 49270
- ^{1} French Land Register data, which excludes lakes, ponds, glaciers > 1 km^{2} (0.386 sq mi or 247 acres) and river estuaries.

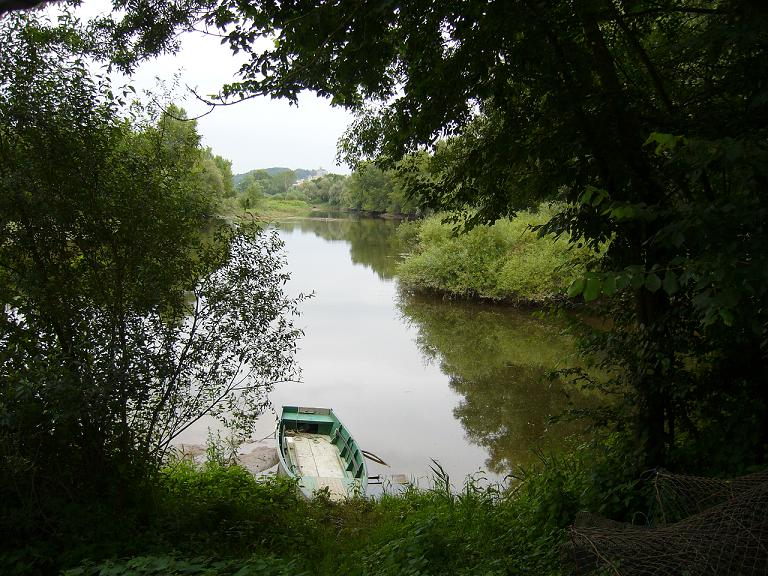
La Varenne

La Varenne (French pronunciation: [la vaʁɛn]) is a former commune in the Maine-et-Loire department in western France. On 15 December 2015, it was merged into the new commune Orée-d'Anjou.

The inhabitants of the town of La Varenne are "Varennais, Varennaises".

== Demography ==
Historical population
Year	Pop.	±% p.a.
1962	864	—
1968	887	+0.44%
1975	904	+0.27%
1982	1,088	+2.68%
1990	1,278	+2.03%
1999	1,366	+0.74%
2006	1,599	+2.28%
2022	1,837	+0.87%
Source: EHESS and INSEE

== See also ==
- Communes of the Maine-et-Loire département
