= Landemont =

- Part of Orée-d'Anjou
- Location of Landemont
- Location within France Location within Pays de la Loire
- Coordinates: 47°15′57″N 1°14′27″W
- Country: France
- Region: Pays de la Loire
- Department: Maine-et-Loire
- Arrondissement: Cholet
- Canton: La Pommeraye
- Commune: Orée-d'Anjou
- Area^{1}: 18.67 km^{2} (7.21 sq mi)
- Elevation: 90 m (300 ft)
- Highest elevation: 104 m (341 ft)
- Lowest elevation: 18 m (59 ft)
- Population (2022): 1,928
  - Density: 103.3/km^{2} (267.5/sq mi)
- Demonym(s): Landemontais, Landemontaise
- Time zone: UTC+01:00 (CET)
  - Summer (DST): UTC+02:00 (CEST)
- Postal code: 49270
- ^{1} French Land Register data, which excludes lakes, ponds, glaciers > 1 km^{2} (0.386 sq mi or 247 acres) and river estuaries.

Landemont (French pronunciation: [lɑ̃dmɔ̃]) is a former commune in the Maine-et-Loire department in western France. On 15 December 2015, it was merged into the new commune Orée-d'Anjou.

== See also ==
- Communes of the Maine-et-Loire department
