= Ranville =

- Commune
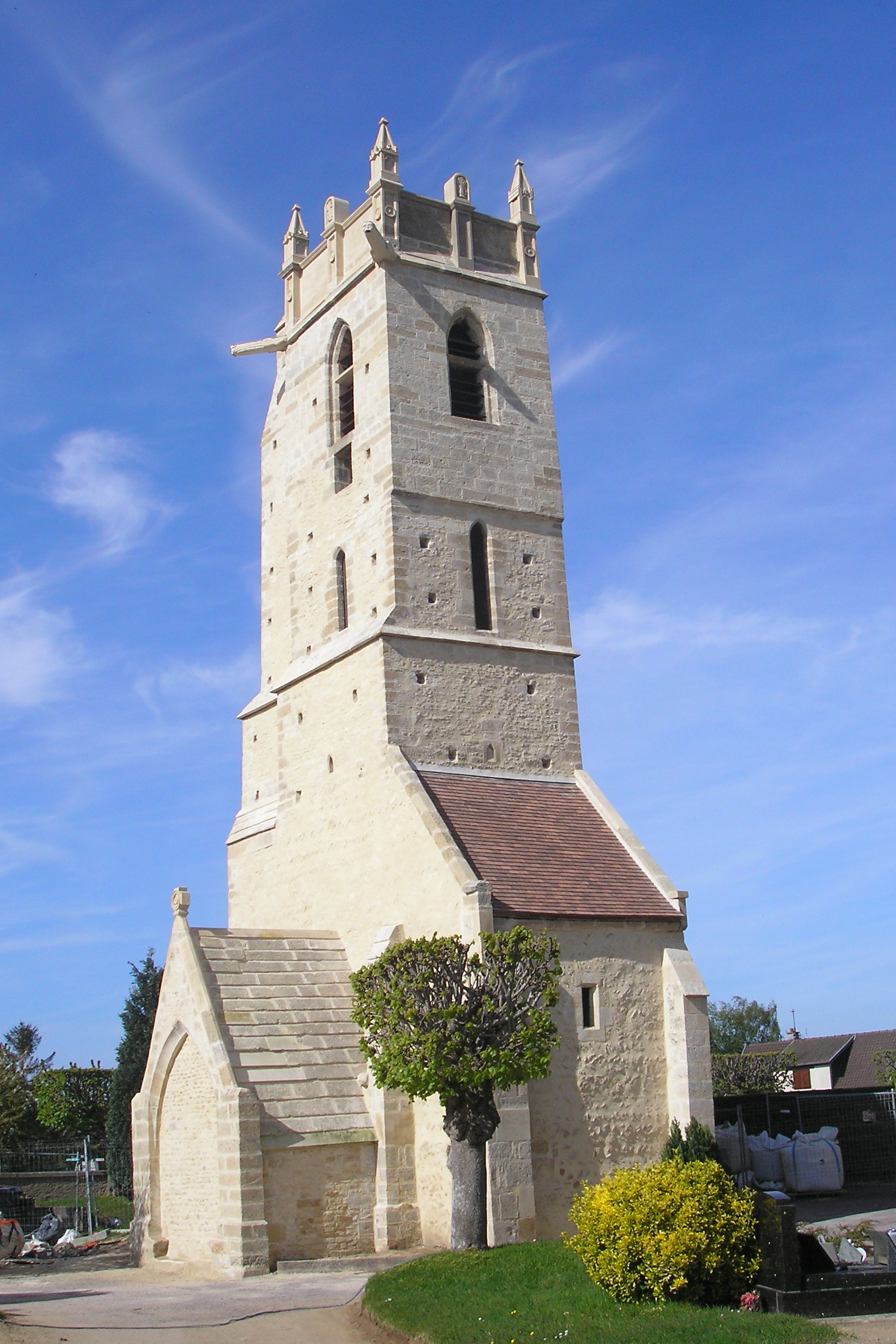
- The belltower of the church in Ranville

- Coat of arms
- Location of Ranville
- Location within France Location within Normandy
- Coordinates: 49°13′55″N 0°15′23″W
- Country: France
- Region: Normandy
- Department: Calvados
- Arrondissement: Lisieux
- Canton: Cabourg
- Intercommunality: CC Normandie-Cabourg-Pays d'Auge

Government
  - Mayor (2020–2026): Jean-Luc Adélaïde
- Area^{1}: 8.42 km^{2} (3.25 sq mi)
- Elevation: 26 m (85 ft)
- Highest elevation: 49 m (161 ft)
- Lowest elevation: 1 m (3.3 ft)
- Population (2023): 2,074
  - Density: 246/km^{2} (638/sq mi)
- Time zone: UTC+01:00 (CET)
  - Summer (DST): UTC+02:00 (CEST)
- INSEE/Postal code: 14530 /14860
- ^{1} French Land Register data, which excludes lakes, ponds, glaciers > 1 km^{2} (0.386 sq mi or 247 acres) and river estuaries.

Ranville (French pronunciation: [ʁɑ̃vil]) is a commune in the Calvados department in the Normandy region in northwestern France.

Ranville was the first French village liberated on D-Day. The village was liberated by the British 13th Parachute Battalion, commanded by Lieutenant-Colonel Peter Luard. The château du Heaume in the village was subsequently used by the headquarters of the British 6th Airborne Division.

The village features prominently in the book 13 - Lucky For Some which is about the history of the 13th (Lancashire) Parachute Battalion. There are many then and now photographs as well as maps and diagrams of battles that took place in the region.

== Population ==
Historical population
Year	Pop.	±% p.a.
1968	1,005	—
1975	1,519	+6.08%
1982	1,690	+1.54%
1990	1,681	−0.07%
1999	1,896	+1.35%
2007	1,737	−1.09%
2012	1,574	−1.95%
2017	1,805	+2.78%
2023	2,074	+2.34%
Source: INSEE

== Sights ==
- Château de Guernon-Ranville
- Memorial Pegasus
- Ranville War Cemetery

== Gallery ==
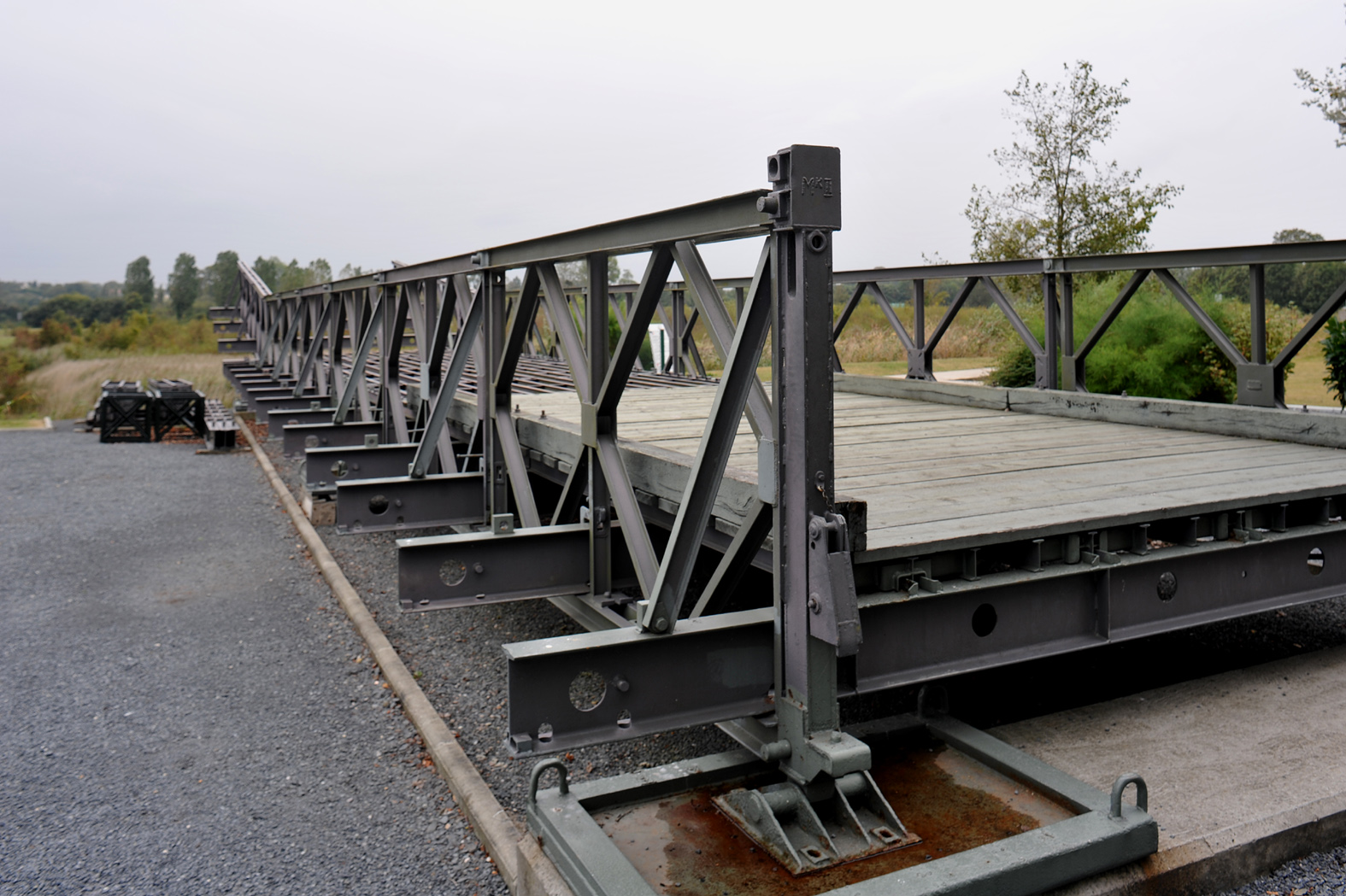
A Bailey bridge section at the Memorial Pegasus museum in Ranville

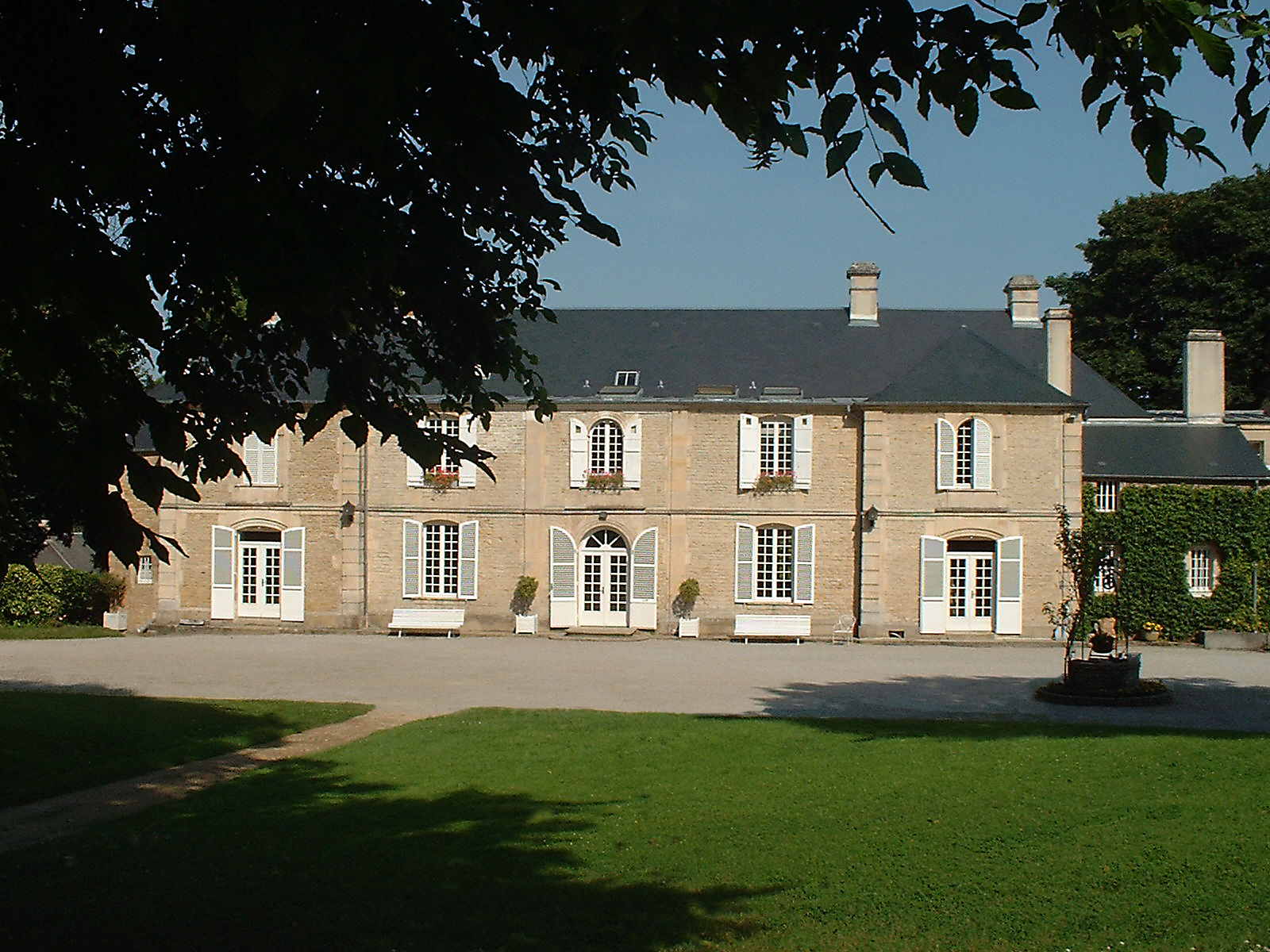
The Château de Guernon-Ranville

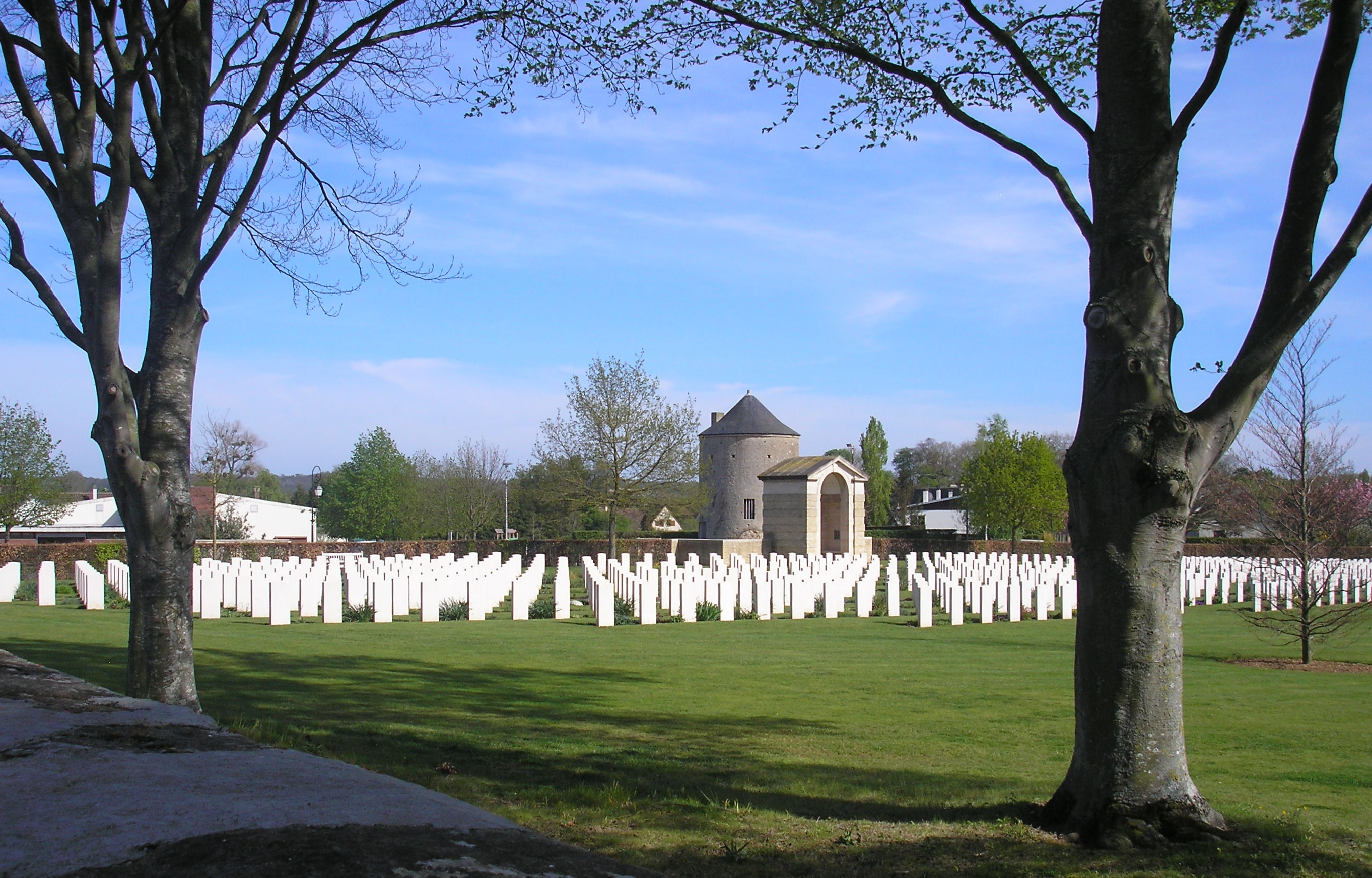
Ranville War Cemetery

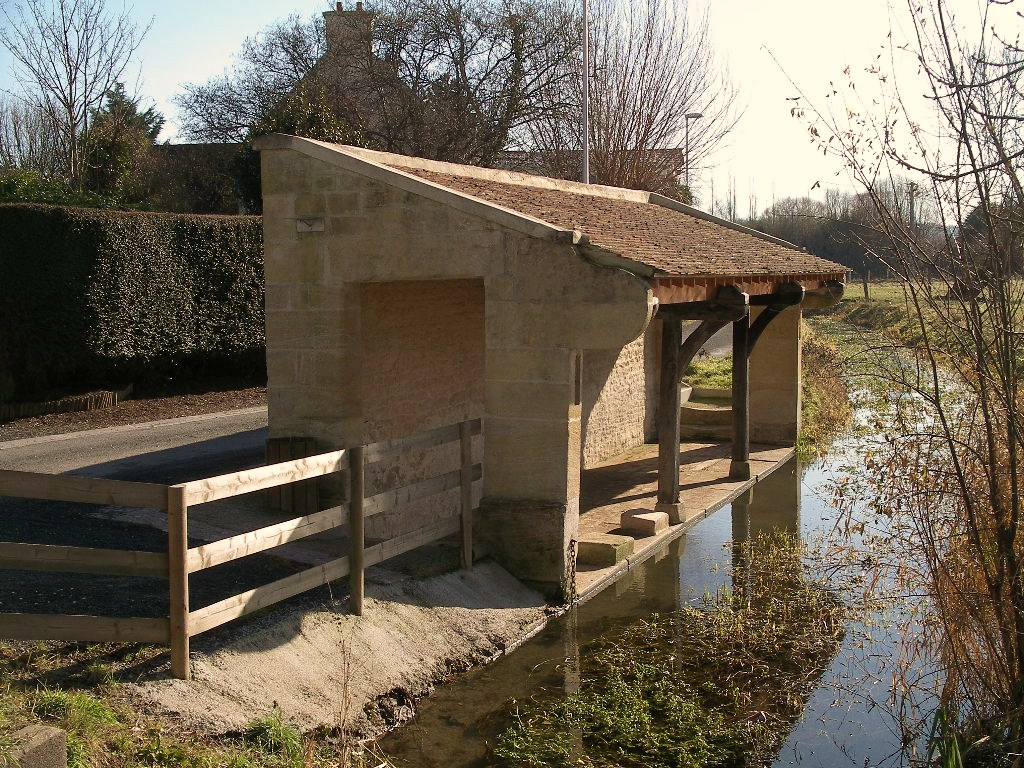
Lavoir

== See also ==
- Communes of the Calvados department
