= Champtoceaux =

- Part of Orée-d'Anjou
- Location of Champtoceaux
- Location within France Location within Pays de la Loire
- Coordinates: 47°20′16″N 1°15′56″W
- Country: France
- Region: Pays de la Loire
- Department: Maine-et-Loire
- Arrondissement: Cholet
- Canton: La Pommeraye
- Commune: Orée-d'Anjou
- Area^{1}: 15.54 km^{2} (6.00 sq mi)
- Elevation: 71 m (233 ft)
- Highest elevation: 86 m (282 ft)
- Lowest elevation: 2 m (6.6 ft)
- Population (2022): 2,867
  - Density: 184.5/km^{2} (477.8/sq mi)
- Time zone: UTC+01:00 (CET)
  - Summer (DST): UTC+02:00 (CEST)
- Postal code: 49270
- ^{1} French Land Register data, which excludes lakes, ponds, glaciers > 1 km^{2} (0.386 sq mi or 247 acres) and river estuaries.

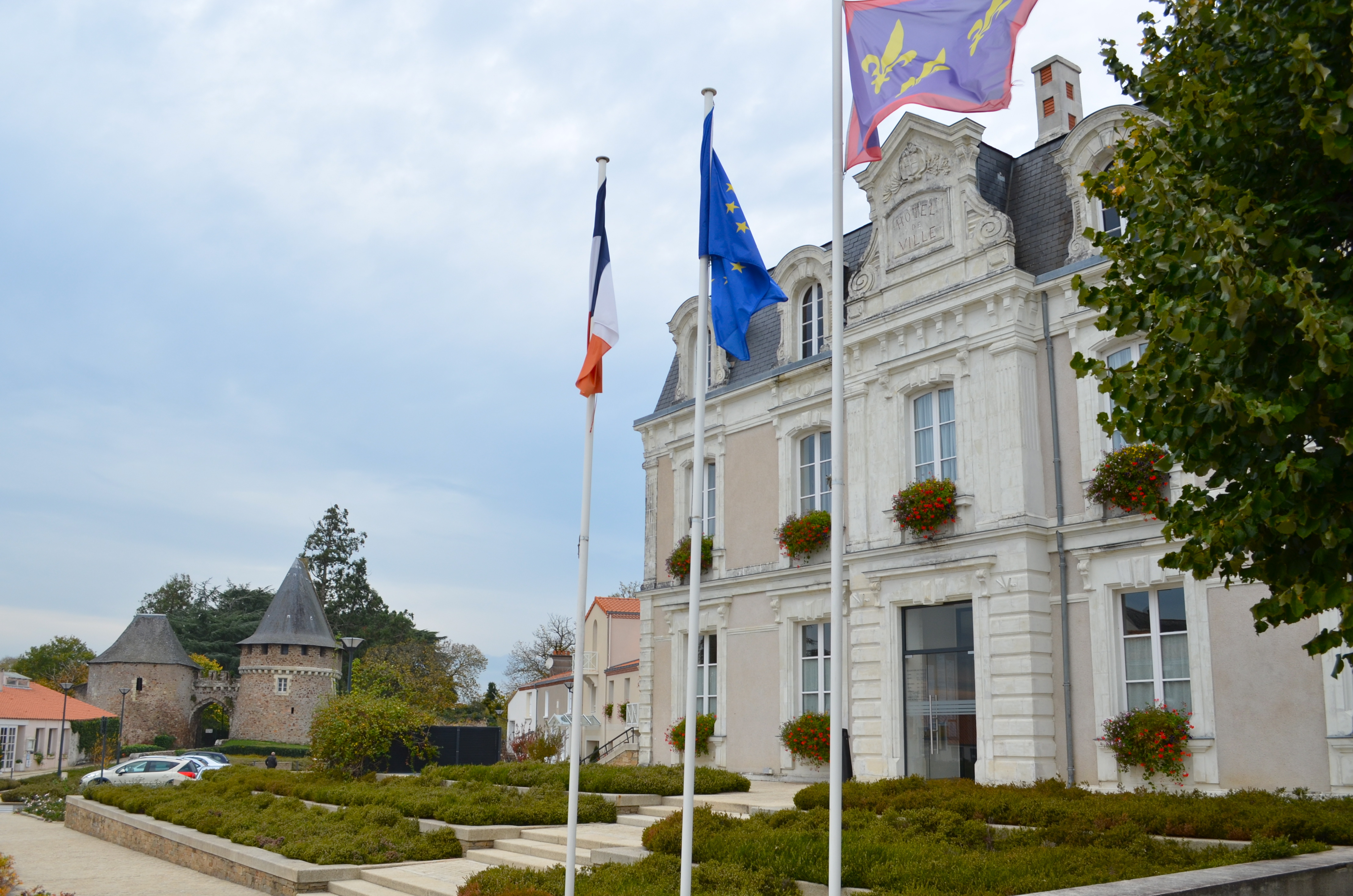
Champtoceaux

Champtoceaux (French pronunciation: [ʃɑ̃tɔso]) is a former commune in the Maine-et-Loire department of western France. On 15 December 2015, it was merged into the new commune Orée-d'Anjou.

== History ==
Champtoceaux name derives from Latin Castrum Sellense. Inhabitants are called Castrocelsiens today.

== Twin towns ==
- (United Kingdom) Verwood in Dorset, England.
- Niederheimbach in the Mainz-Bingen Kreis of Germany.
- Calcinato in the province of Brescia, in the Lombardy region of Italy

== See also ==
- Communes of the Maine-et-Loire department
