= Canton of Mauges-sur-Loire =

Coordinates: 47.36°N 0.86°W

The canton of Mauges-sur-Loire (before March 2020: canton of La Pommeraye) is an administrative division of the Maine-et-Loire department, in western France. It was created at the French canton reorganisation which came into effect in March 2015. Its seat is in Mauges-sur-Loire.

It consists of the following communes:

1. Mauges-sur-Loire
2. Orée-d'Anjou
