= Harry Howard =

Harry Howard may refer to:

- Harry Howard (cricketer) (1885–1960), Australian cricketer
- Harry Howard (footballer, born 1871) (1871–?), English footballer
- Harry Howard (Australian footballer) (1873–1945), Australian rules footballer
- Harry Howard (American football) (born 1949), American football defensive back
- Harry Howard (landscape architect) (1930–2000), Australian landscape architect
- Harry Howard (musician), Australian bass guitarist
- Harry Howard (mayor) (1890–1970), mayor of Perth, Australia
- Harry C. Howard, American politician, mayor of Brockton, Massachusetts
- Harry Howard (actor) (1897–1975), American comedian, better known as Moe Howard

== See also ==
- Henry Howard (disambiguation)
- Harold Howard (disambiguation)
