= Henry Howard =

Henry Howard may refer to:

== Nobles and politicians ==
=== UK ===
- Henry Howard, Earl of Surrey (1517–1547), English aristocrat and poet
- Henry Howard, 1st Earl of Northampton (1540–1614), son of the Earl of Surrey
- Henry Howard, 2nd Viscount Howard of Bindon (c. 1542–1590), aristocrat and courtier
- Henry Howard, 15th Earl of Arundel (1608–1652)
- Henry Howard, 5th Earl of Suffolk (1627–1709)
- Henry Howard, 6th Duke of Norfolk (1628–1684)
- Henry Howard, 7th Duke of Norfolk (1655–1701), politician and soldier
- Henry Howard, 6th Earl of Suffolk (1670–1718), English nobleman
- Henry Howard, 4th Earl of Carlisle (1694–1758), Whig MP for Morpeth 1715–38
- Henry Howard, 11th Earl of Suffolk (1686–1757), English peer
- Henry Howard, 10th Earl of Suffolk (1706–1745), MP for Bere Alston 1728–33
- Henry Howard, 12th Earl of Suffolk (1739–1779), British politician
- Henry Howard, 13th Earl of Suffolk (1779–1779), British peer
- Henry Howard, 13th Duke of Norfolk (1791–1856), Whig MP for Horsham 1829–32
- Henry Howard, 2nd Earl of Effingham (1806–1889), British peer and Member of Parliament
- Henry Howard, 18th Earl of Suffolk (1833–1898), British peer and Liberal Party politician
- Henry Howard, 3rd Earl of Effingham (1837–1898), English peer
- Henry Howard, 4th Earl of Effingham (1866–1927), English peer and member of the House of Lords
- Henry Howard, 19th Earl of Suffolk (1877–1917), British peer
- Henry Howard (1802–1875), British MP for Steyning 1824–26, New Shoreham 1826–32
- Henry Howard (MP for Penrith) (1850–1914), British MP
- Henry Thomas Howard (1808–1851), British soldier and politician
- Henry Francis Howard (1809–1898), British diplomat, minister to several countries
- Henry Howard (diplomat) (1843–1921), first formal British envoy to the Vatican for over 300 years
- Henry Howard (colonial governor) (1913–1977), British journalist, military officer, and colonial leader in the Caribbean

=== U.S. ===
- Henry Howard (Rhode Island politician) (1826–1905), Republican governor of Rhode Island
- Henry Howard (Detroit politician) (1801–1878), businessman and mayor of Detroit
- Henry Howard (Port Huron politician) (1833–1894), businessman and mayor of Port Huron
- Henry Howard (Georgia politician) (1955-2022), member of Georgia House of Representatives
- Henry Howard Sr. (Georgia politician) (1930–2005), member of Georgia House of Representatives

== Other ==
- Henry Howard (1684–1720), English Catholic priest, created titular bishop of Utica and coadjutor with Bonaventure Giffard
- Henry Howard (historian) (1757–1842), English antiquarian and family historian
- Henry Howard (artist) (1769–1847), painter
- Henry Howard (priest) (1795–1868), dean of Lichfield
- Henry Howard (architect) (1818–1884), designer of landmarks in New Orleans and Louisiana
- Henry Howard (Methodist) (1859–1933), Australian preacher
- Henry Newman Howard (1861–1929), English poet and dramatist
- T. Henry Howard (1849–1923), chief of the staff of the Salvation Army
- Henry Eliot Howard (1873–1940), amateur English ornithologist
- Henry Howard (British Army officer) (1915–2000)

== See also ==
- Harry Howard (disambiguation)
- Henry Fitzalan-Howard (disambiguation)
