= Oxfordshire and Buckinghamshire Light Infantry =

Former regiment of the British Army

Oxfordshire Light Infantry Oxfordshire and Buckinghamshire Light Infantry 1st Green Jackets (43rd and 52nd)
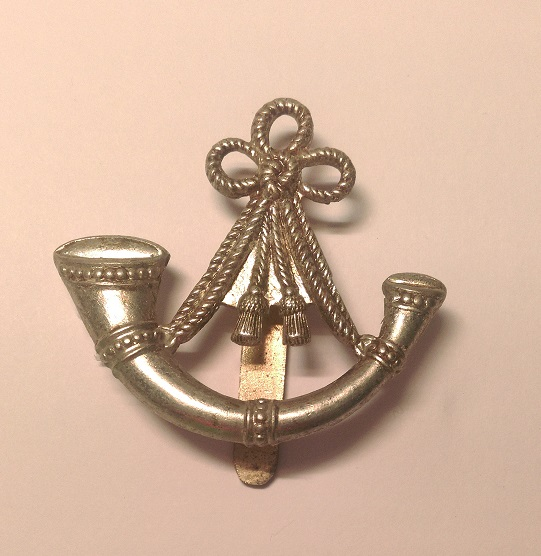
- Cap badge of the Oxfordshire and Buckinghamshire Light Infantry.
- Active: 1881–1958
- Country: United Kingdom
- Branch: British Army
- Type: Infantry
- Role: Light infantry
- Size: 2 Regular battalions 1 Militia battalion 2 Territorial and Volunteer battalions Up to 8 hostilities-only battalions
- Garrison/HQ: Cowley Barracks, Oxford
- Nicknames: The Ox and Bucks; The Light Bobs
- March: Nachtlager in Granada
- Anniversaries: Waterloo (18 June)

Commanders
- Ceremonial chief: HM Carlos I of Portugal

The Oxfordshire and Buckinghamshire Light Infantry was a light infantry regiment of the British Army that existed from 1881 until 1958, serving in the Second Boer War, World War I and World War II.

The regiment was formed as a consequence of the 1881 Childers Reforms, a continuation of the Cardwell Reforms, by the amalgamation of the 43rd (Monmouthshire) Regiment of Foot (Light Infantry) and the 52nd (Oxfordshire) Regiment of Foot (Light Infantry), forming the 1st and 2nd Battalions of the Oxfordshire Light Infantry on 1 July 1881. In 1908, as part of the Haldane Reforms, the regiment's title was altered to become the Oxfordshire and Buckinghamshire Light Infantry, commonly shortened to the Ox and Bucks.

After service in many conflicts and wars, the Ox and Bucks Light Infantry was, in 1948, reduced to a single Regular Army battalion and on 7 November 1958, following Duncan Sandys' 1957 Defence White Paper, it was renamed the 1st Green Jackets (43rd and 52nd), forming part of the Green Jackets Brigade.

== Formation ==
The regiment was formed as a consequence of the 1881 Childers Reforms, a continuation of the Cardwell Reforms, by the amalgamation of the 43rd (Monmouthshire) Regiment of Foot (Light Infantry) and the 52nd (Oxfordshire) Regiment of Foot (Light Infantry), forming the 1st and 2nd battalions of the Oxfordshire Light Infantry on 1 July 1881. The former numerical titles of the battalions remained in unofficial usage. As part of the formation of the regiment, the following Volunteer Force and Militia units were placed under command of the regiment:

- 3rd (Royal Bucks Militia) Battalion based in High Wycombe
- 4th (Oxford Militia) Battalion based in Oxford
- [5th] 1st Volunteer Battalion based in Great Marlow, former 1st Buckinghamshire Rifle Volunteer Corps
- [6th] 2nd Volunteer Battalion based in Oxford, former 2nd Oxfordshire Rifle Volunteer Corps
- [7th] 3rd (Oxford University) Volunteer Battalion based at Oxford University, former 1st (Oxford University) Oxfordshire Rifle Volunteer Corps
- [8th] 4th (Eton College) Volunteer Battalion based at Eton College, former 2nd (Eton College) Buckinghamshire Rifle Volunteer Corps

== Operations across the Empire (1881–1914) ==
1st Battalion
The 43rd Foot was based in Burma when it became the 1st Battalion. In 1882 the unit moved to Bangalore, India. In 1887 the battalion returned home, being based in Parkhurst, England. It moved to Kinsale, Ireland in 1893 and, having been based in other parts of Ireland, returned to England in 1898. In December 1899 the Second Boer War began and the 1st Battalion arrived in Southern Africa to take part in it. It saw extensive service in the conflict, including in the relief of the besieged British garrison at Kimberley and in the defeat of the Boers at Paardeberg in February. The war raged on for a further two years; the regiment saw extensive service for the duration of the conflict. The Oxfordshires returned to England in September 1902 with the conclusion of the war, and was stationed at Chatham. It moved to India the following year where it was based until the outbreak of World War I in 1914.

2nd Battalion
The 52nd Light Infantry was based in Oxford, England, when it became the 2nd Battalion. This was the 52nd of Waterloo fame who, under the command of Colonel Sir John Colborne, broke a battalion of the Chasseurs of the Imperial Guard. In 1884 it arrived in Gibraltar and the following year the battalion took part in active service for the first time as a 2nd battalion when a detachment under the command of Lieutenant Scott was deployed as mounted infantry in the Nile Expedition. In 1886 it was based in India, where it would remain into the 20th century. During its stay the battalion formed part of the Peshawar column in the Tirah Expedition in the volatile North-West Frontier in 1897; where the battalion saw action in the Khyber Pass, around Koda Khel and Ali Masjid. In late 1902 the battalion transferred from Bombay to Poona, and in 1903 the battalion returned home. It was initially based in Chatham and in 1907 moved to Tidworth, Wiltshire. The battalion was stationed at Albuhera barracks, Aldershot, when World War I commenced.

On 16 October 1908, as part of the Haldane Reforms, the regiment's title was altered to become the Oxfordshire and Buckinghamshire Light Infantry, commonly shortened to the Ox and Bucks. Also in 1908, the Volunteers and Militia were reorganised nationally, with the former becoming the Territorial Force and the latter the Special Reserve; the regiment now had one Reserve battalion and two Territorial battalions.

== First World War (1914–18) ==
Officers of the 2/1st Battalion, Buckinghamshire Battalion, Ox and Bucks Light Infantry, at the cricket pavilion at the Northampton Asylum, c. 1915.

During the war, the Ox and Bucks raised 12 battalions (17 in all), six of which fought on the Western Front, two in Italy, two in Macedonia and one in Mesopotamia. The regiment won 59 battle honours and four theatre honours. Many gallantry honours were awarded to the Ox and Bucks, including two Victoria Crosses – the most prestigious honour for bravery in the face of the enemy – that were awarded to Company Sergeant Major Edward Brooks and Lance-Corporal Alfred Wilcox, both of the 2/4th Battalion. 5,878 officers and men of the Oxfordshire and Buckinghamshire Light Infantry lost their lives during the First World War.

=== Western Front ===
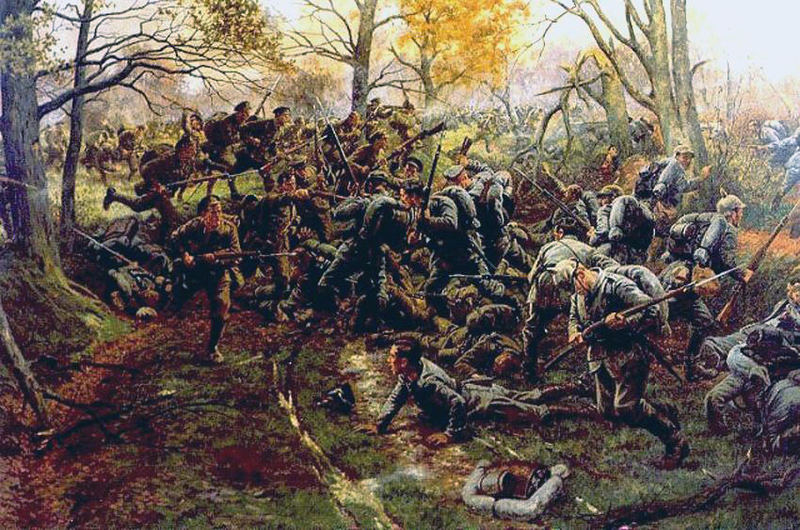
2nd Ox and Bucks defeating the Prussian Guard at Nonne Bosschen. Painting by William Barnes Wollen (1857–1936).

In August 1914, the 2nd Ox and Bucks, commanded by Henry Rodolph Davies, arrived on the Western Front, as part of the 5th Infantry Brigade, 2nd Division, I Corps – the 2nd Division was one of the first divisions of the British Expeditionary Force (BEF) to arrive in France. The battalion took part in the first British battle of the war, at Mons, where the British defeated the German forces that they had encountered on 23 August. A combination of German numerical advantage and the French fifth Army's retreat led to the battalion subsequently taking part in the 220-mile retreat, in exceptionally hot weather, that began the following day, not stopping until just on the outskirts of Paris, then halting the German advance at the First Battle of the Marne (5–9 September). The 2nd Ox and Bucks later took part in all the subsidiary battles of the First Battle of Ypres (19 October – 22 November) that saw the heart ripped out of the old Regular Army, with 54,000 casualties being sustained. In the First Battle of Ypres the 2nd Ox and Bucks first engagement with the enemy was on 20 October in an attack on the Passchendaele ridge. The battalion had heavy casualties: four officers killed and five wounded and 143 other ranks killed or wounded. On 31 October the Germans launched a large scale attack against Lieutenant-General Sir Douglas Haig's I Corps in the area of Ypres which commenced with a heavy bombardment followed by a mass infantry attack; two companies of the 2nd Ox and Bucks took part in the defence and subsequent counter-attack which forced the enemy back to their front line. On 11 November the Germans made another attempt to capture Ypres, sending—on the orders of the German Kaiser—the élite Prussian Guard against the British forces. The 2nd Battalion counter-attacked them at Nonne Bosschen wood, preventing their advance and then routing them; almost one hundred years after the 52nd had defeated Napoleon's Imperial Guard at Waterloo. First Ypres was the last major battle of 1914. The 2nd Ox and Bucks sustained 632 casualties during the first five months of the war and by 1915 it was a very different battalion from that which had arrived on the Western Front at the start of the war.

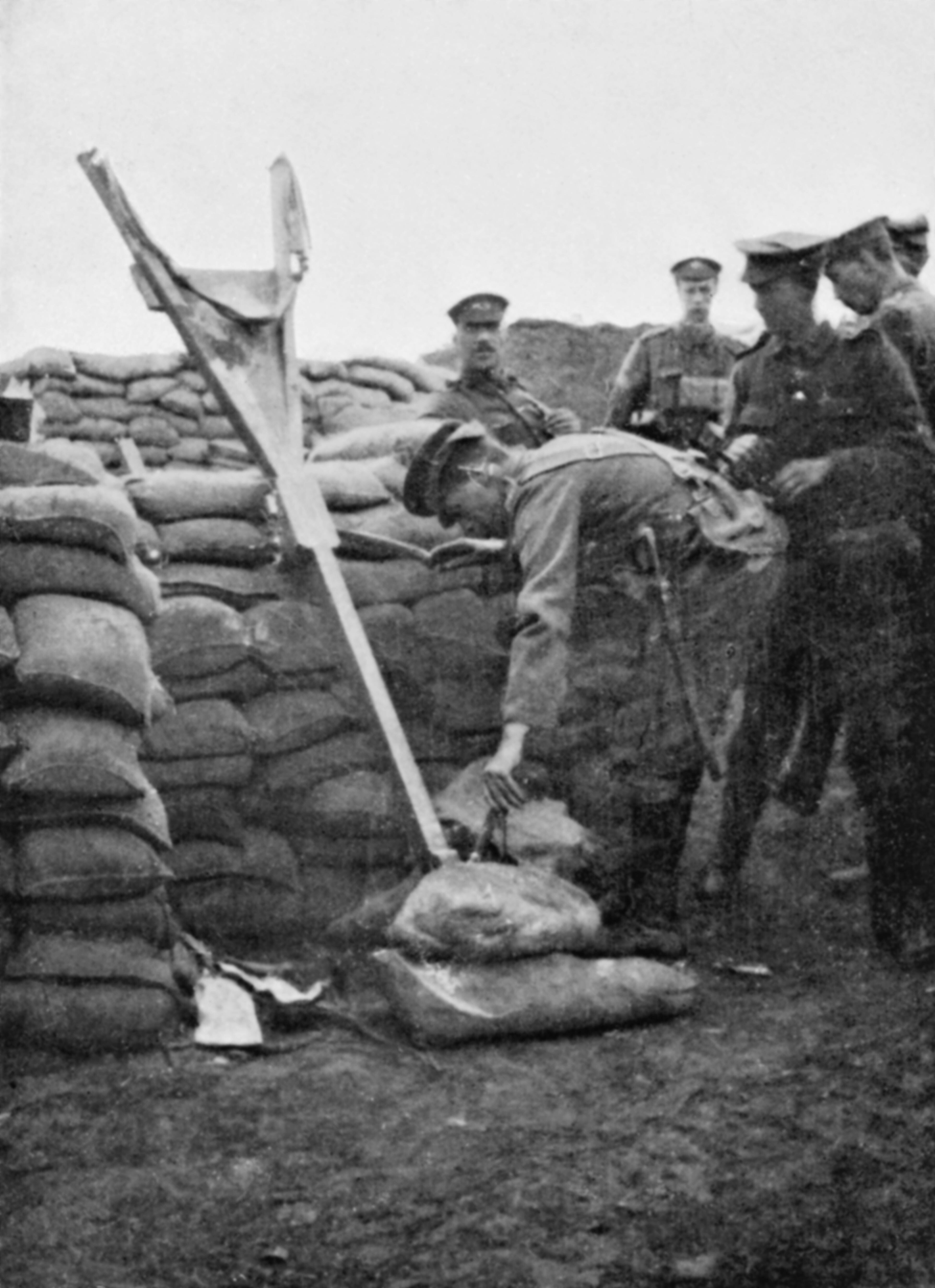
Troops of the OBLI using a Leach trench catapult on the Western Front.

In 1915 trench warfare commenced with both sides developing impregnable defences; leading to high casualties in return for minimal gains. At the Battle of Festubert (9–16 May) – which was launched in support of the French attack south of Vimy Ridge and included the first British night action of the war – the 2nd Ox and Bucks were part of the second wave of the 5th Brigade attack and, during the course of the battle, suffered just under 400 casualties: the largest number the regiment had sustained in a single battle since the Siege of Badajoz over 100 years earlier. The 2nd Ox and Bucks were involved in heavy fighting at Richebourg l'Avoue on 15–16 May. The 2nd Ox and Bucks and other battalions of the regiment also saw action at the Battle of Loos (25 September – 8 October): 2nd Ox and Bucks took part in the subsidiary attack at Givenchy with 263 casualties on 25 September. The Ox and Bucks 5th (Service) Battalion went into the Battle of Loos on 25 September 1915 at a strength of 17 officers and 767 men and only two officers and 180 men survived the battle. The 2nd Battalion took part in the subsequent attack against the Hohenzollern Redoubt (13–19 October). Following the battle of Loos few pre-1914 2nd Ox and Bucks officers remained, they had either become casualties or promoted to take up positions in other battalions. The gallantry awards made to members of the battalion for bravery during the battle of Loos included the award of the Distinguished Conduct Medals to CSM Fred Clare and to Acting Corporal Horace Duester.

In January 1916, the 2nd Ox and Bucks were at Cottes St. Hilaire; the 2nd Division was at that time taking its turn in the corps reserve. The battalion later moved to Bethune and then returned to the Festubert trenches. Lieutenant Colonel Richard Crosse took over command of the 2nd Ox and Bucks on 8 July 1916 and was to lead the battalion for the next three years. The 1/4th Ox and Bucks took part in the first day of the Battle of the Somme on 1 July 1916, in which the British Army suffered over 60,000 casualties – the largest number sustained in a day by the British Army. The battalions of the Ox and Bucks on the Western Front saw extensive service during the Battle of the Somme (1 July – 18 November), suffering heavily, including at Mametz Wood, Pozières and at Ancre, the last major subsidiary battle. On 28 July the 2nd Ox and Bucks moved to front-line trenches near Waterlot farm and sustained heavy casualties at the battle there on 30 July. The 2nd Ox and Bucks fought on the Somme battlefield at Delville Wood, Guillemont and on 13 November in the battle of Beaumont Hamel: a large attack on the Redan Ridge in the battle of the Ancre. The 2nd Ox and Bucks sustained many casualties during the battle of Beaumont Hamel, including Captain Ralph Kite who within the previous 12 months, had been awarded the Military Cross and twice mentioned in despatches.

The New Year of 1917 brought with it a period of severe weather conditions on the Somme plain which led to an unofficial truce between the two sides. In March 1917, the Germans began the withdrawal to the Hindenburg Line (14 March – 5 April) and at the end of March the 2nd Ox and Bucks moved from the Somme to the back areas of Arras. The 2nd Ox and Bucks and other battalions of the regiment saw much involvement in the Arras Offensive (9 April – 16 May), including at the Battles of Scarpe and Arleux. The 2nd Ox and Bucks took part in the battle of Arras from 11 April and had a leading role in the battle of Arleux on 28–29 April: during the battle the battalion protected the right flank of the Canadian 1st Division which was critical to the capture of the village of Arleux and sustained more than 200 casualties. The battalions of the Ox and Bucks saw further service in many of the subsidiary battles during the Battle of Passchendaele (also known as Third Ypres) that took place between 31 July–6 November. Some of the battles that the Ox and Bucks took part in included Menin Road and Polygon Wood in September and early October. The 2nd Ox and Bucks and the 6th (Service) Battalion, Ox and Bucks also took part in the Battle of Cambrai (20 November–3 December) that saw the first large-scale use of tanks by the British and was the last major battle of the year.

In January 1918, the 2nd Ox and Bucks marched to Beaulencourt. They moved to Havrincourt Wood later that month, and then on 9 February to Metz-en-Couture. They were at Vallulart Camp, Ytres, when on 21 March 1918 the Germans launched the last-gasp Spring Offensive (Operation Michael), also known as the Ludendorf offensive, which led to the furthest advance by either side since 1914. The 2nd Ox and Bucks were due to go into the corps reserve when the enemy began a colossal bombardment of Allied positions and on 22 March 1918 were in position around the village of Bertincourt. They, and other battalions of the regiment, sustained heavy casualties as part of the defence of the Somme during the Battle of St. Quentin (21–23 March), the First Battle of Bapaume (24–25 March) and in subsequent battles that saw the Germans achieve significant gains as the battalion was forced back across the old Somme battlefield to the 1916 line on the Ancre. The battalion remained in the Ancre area from 29 March 1918 to 3 April 1918.

One soldier who arrived on Sunday 7 April as one of the reinforcements to replace the 2/4th Battalion (184th Brigade, 1st Division) recorded that they had been reduced to 22 survivors with one rifle and three sets of webbing between them, commenting, 'I doubt if in the whole war any battalion was wiped out so completely'.

After the enemy Spring offensive lost its momentum, the Germans launched Operation Georgette in April which the Ox and Bucks defended against in the Battle of the Lys and subsequent actions.

In the summer of 1918, the 2nd Ox and Bucks held the line at Bailleulemont, near Arras. By August the German offensives had failed and the Allies had launched a counter-attack. In August the 2nd Ox and Bucks took part in the Battle of Albert (1918) (21–23 August) and the Second Battle of Bapaume (31 August – 3 September) while the 2/4th Ox and Bucks and the 2/1st Buckinghamshires (both part of 184th Brigade of 61st Division) took part in the advance into Flanders, with both offensives seeing the Allies advance to the Hindenburg Line by early September. The 2nd Ox and Bucks took part in the offensive against it that saw the Allies break through the defences, taking part in the Battle of Havrincourt (12 September), Battle of the Canal du Nord (27 September – 1 October) and the Second Battle of Cambrai (8–9 October). The regiment then took part in the last actions of the war, taking part in the Battle of the Selle and the Battle of Valenciennes. The 2nd Ox and Bucks' last action of the war was the battle for Escarmain on 23 October 1918 during the Battle of the Selle (17–25 October) The Germans continued to be driven back.

The war ended on 11 November 1918 with the signing of the Armistice between the Allies and Germany. Following their leading role in the final British offensive, the 2nd Ox and Bucks were at St.Pol, near Valenciennes, after the Armistice. The 2nd Ox and Bucks crossed the German frontier at Malmedy on 9 December 1918. The battalion was later stationed in Zons, near Cologne, as part of the army of occupation. At the end of the war there were only 66 2nd Ox and Bucks of all ranks still serving with the battalion from those that had left Aldershot, Hampshire, for the Western Front on 13 August 1914: of these 39 served throughout the war.

=== Mesopotamia ===
The 1st Ox and Bucks, as part of the 17th (Ahmednagar) Brigade, 6th (Poona) Division, left India for Mesopotamia (now Iraq) in November 1914; there, the battalion took part in the campaign against the Ottoman forces that ruled the country.

The battalion took part in the march towards Kut-al-Amara with the intention of capturing it from the Ottomans. The battle for Kut began on 26 September 1915 and raged for a number of days until the Ottomans went into retreat and Kut was captured on 28 September. The battalion then took part in the Battle of Ctesiphon (22–24 November) during the pursuit of the Ottoman forces and in the effort to capture the capital Baghdad, which ended in the 6th Poona Division being defeated by the Ottomans. 635 officers and men of the battalion fought in the battle of Ctesiphon and 304 became casualties. The Division subsequently retreated to Kut, reaching it on 3 December, where it was besieged by the Ottomans, beginning on 7 December, with a garrison of 10,000 Britons and Indians. The Ottomans launched numerous attempts to take Kut, all of which were repulsed by the defenders, with both sides suffering heavy casualties. The British launched numerous attempts to relieve Kut, all of which failed with heavy losses. On 26 April 1916—supplies had dwindled significantly and many of the garrison's defenders were suffering from sickness—the garrison negotiated a cease-fire with the Ottomans and on 29 April the British-Indian force of 8,000 surrendered to the Ottomans, including 400 men of the 1st Ox and Bucks. Many of the Ox and Bucks taken at Kut, like the rest of the prisoners, suffered mistreatment by the Ottomans; only 71 of all ranks of the 1st Ox and Bucks who had been taken prisoner returned home to the UK. It is estimated that just under 2,000 Britons and up to 3,000 Indians perished in captivity.

A Provisional Battalion had been formed in January 1916 from reinforcements intended for the 1st Ox and Bucks, joining the 28th Indian Brigade, 7th (Meerut) Division. The battalion joined the Lines of Communication (LoC) force and the Provisional Battalion was re-titled the 1st Battalion on 6 July 1917. On 19 October 1917 the battalion transferred to the 50th Indian Brigade, 15th Indian Division. By then, the British had taken Baghdad and were gradually pushing the Ottomans further back. Between 26 and 27 March 1918 it took part in fighting against the Ottomans at Khan Baghdadi. The Ottomans signed an Armistice with the Allies on 30 October, ending the war in the Middle East.

=== Italy and Macedonia ===
The 1/4th Battalion, Ox and Bucks and 1/1st Buckinghamshire Battalion were part of the 145th (South Midland) Brigade, 48th (South Midland) Division that left the Western Front for the Italian Front in November 1917—which had been a member of the Allies since May 1915—after she suffered very heavy casualties at the Battle of Caporetto. The regiment and the rest of the British forces did not take part in a major battle until June 1918 when they participated in the Battle of Asiago (15–16 June), that saw the Austro-Hungarians—an ally of Germany—successfully defeated in their offensive against the Allies; it was the last Austro-Hungarian offensive against Italy. On 23 October the Allies launched a successful offensive against Austria-Hungary, with the regiment crossing the Piave River, taking part in the Battle of Vittorio Veneto. The Austro-Hungarians signed an Armistice with the Allies on 4 November 1918 and the 1/4th Ox and Bucks and 1/1st Buckinghamshires ended the war in Austria-Hungary.

In October 1915 the British and French landed in Salonika at the request of the Greek Prime Minister. Both the 7th and 8th Service battalions were part of the 26th Division which landed between December 1915 and February 1916. The 7th (Service) Battalion was part of 78th Brigade whereas the 8th (Service) Battalion was a pioneer battalion attached to the division. The regiment's time in the Balkans was mostly quiet, experiencing sporadic fighting, but it included the repulsing of a Bulgarian invasion of Greece at Lake Doiran in April–May 1917. The regiment saw very heavy fighting against the Bulgarians around Doiran the following September, after the Allies had launched an offensive in July 1918 with the intention of ending the war in the Balkans. The war ended on 30 September 1918 with Bulgaria signing an Armistice with the Allies. The Ox and Bucks, along with the rest of the division, was subsequently employed for a brief period of time on occupation duties in Bulgaria.

== War memorial ==
After the end of the First World War, the regiment commissioned a war memorial to commemorate its fallen. Designed by Sir Edwin Lutyens, the Oxfordshire and Buckinghamshire Light Infantry War Memorial stands on Rose Hill in Cowley. It was unveiled in 1923 and is now a grade II listed building.

== Inter-war era ==
1st Battalion
Major-General Sir John Hanbury-Williams was appointed Colonel Commandant of the regiment in 1918. The 1st Ox and Bucks arrived in Arkhangelsk, Northern Russia, in May 1919, as part of the Allied force that intervened in the Russian Civil War to assist the 'White Russians' in their fight against the Bolsheviks. The battalion left later in the year, being based in Limerick, Ireland in 1920 to assist in operations against Sinn Féin and the IRA. It moved to Shorncliffe Army Camp, England, two years later. In 1925 the battalion joined the British Army of Occupation in Germany, remaining there for two-years before heading for Parkhurst, England. The 1st Ox and Bucks remained in England, based at Hyderabad Barracks, Colchester, until the outbreak of war in 1939.

2nd Battalion
In May 1919, the 2nd Ox and Bucks left Germany where they had been part of the army of occupation and returned to Cowley Barracks, Oxford, the following month. The battalion then moved to Tipperary, Ireland, to take part in operations against the IRA and Sinn Féin. In March 1922 the battalion arrived in Rawalpindi, India, later moving to Razmak in Waziristan on the North-West Frontier. In 1929 the battalion moved to Maymo in Upper Burma and then to Rangoon. In 1934 the battalion returned to India, initially to Bareilly and then to Mhow where it remained until it left India in June 1940, arriving home the following month.

General Sir Bernard Paget initiated the founding of a regimental chapel in Christ Church Cathedral, Oxford in 1930. A service of dedication was held in 1931.

== Second World War (1939–1945) ==
On 3 September 1939 – two days after Germany had invaded Poland—the British Empire, France and their Allies declared war on Germany, beginning the Second World War. During that conflict the regiment raised nine battalions and the 3rd (Special Reserve) Training Battalion. The regiment saw service in France, North Africa, Burma, Italy, Belgium, the Netherlands and Germany. Approximately 1,408 officers and other ranks of the Oxfordshire and Buckinghamshire Light Infantry lost their lives during the Second World War.

=== North-West Europe (France and Belgium) 1939–40 ===
The British rapidly sent the British Expeditionary Force (BEF) to France in September 1939 which included the Regular Army 1st Battalion, Oxford and Bucks as part of 11th Infantry Brigade, 4th Infantry Division. They were joined in January 1940 by the 1st Buckinghamshire Battalion and the 4th Ox and Bucks, both of which were Territorial units serving alongside the 4th Battalion, Royal Berkshire Regiment, as part of the 145th Infantry Brigade, part of 48th (South Midland) Infantry Division. In late January, due to a new policy within the BEF of integrating the Regular and Territorials, the 1st Ox and Bucks was exchanged in 11th Brigade for the 5th (Huntingdonshire) Battalion, Northamptonshire Regiment and transferred to the 143rd Infantry Brigade, of the 48th Division.

The Wehrmacht launched its invasion of the Low Countries on 10 May 1940, shattering a period of the conflict that was known as the Phoney War. The German invasion of northern Belgium—where the BEF was located—was a diversion with the main attack being through the poorly-defended Ardennes forest. The BEF withdrew west towards the Dendre river after the Dutch Army had surrendered during the Battle of the Netherlands, and then withdrew further towards the Scheldt river by 19 May. The 1st Ox and Bucks (43rd), 4th Ox and Bucks (TA) and 1st Bucks (TA) were involved in action along the line of the River Scheldt (Escaut), south of Tournai. The British force, having given a good account of themselves in the defence of the Scheldt, eventually withdrew into France, moving towards the area around Dunkirk. The evacuation of British forces back to Britain began on 26 May, known as Operation Dynamo (26 May–3 June). The 1st Ox and Bucks took part in the Battle of the Ypres-Comines Canal (26–28 May) and were eventually evacuated from Dunkirk, having suffered more than 300 casualties. The 4th Ox and Bucks (TA) took part in the defence of Cassel, Nord until 29 May. 4th Ox and Bucks were eventually encircled by German forces near Watou and forced to surrender. The battalion had split into two groups with the aim of reaching Dunkirk by going through the surrounding enemy forces. The battalion sustained many casualties and had to surrender; becoming prisoners of war for the next five years. Only four soldiers from the two groups of 4th Oxfordshire and Buckinghamshire Light Infantry that had left Cassel returned to the UK. The 1st Buckinghamshire Battalion took part in the battle for Hazebrouck which commenced on 27 May where they came under heavy attack from all directions by the German 8th Panzer Division and for a week managed to delay the German advance. The 1st Bucks were eventually ordered to fight their way back to Dunkirk; only 10 officers and approximately 200 men of the battalion reached the United Kingdom. However, more than 338,000 British, French and Belgian troops were evacuated during the Dunkirk evacuation.

=== North-West Europe 1944–45 ===
==== 1st Battalion ====
===== Normandy =====
After Dunkirk the 1st Ox and Bucks was brought up to strength with large numbers of conscripts and later transferred to the 148th Independent Brigade Group serving in Northern Ireland. In 1941 the 1st Ox and Bucks commemorated the bicentenary of the 43rd Light Infantry which included a celebratory parade and evening concert. In June 1942, however, the battalion was again transferred, this time to the 71st Infantry Brigade, serving alongside the 1st Battalion, East Lancashire Regiment and 1st Battalion, Highland Light Infantry, part of the 42nd Armoured Division. In October 1943 the brigade became part of the 53rd (Welsh) Infantry Division and started training for the invasion of North-Western Europe. The battalion would remain with the 53rd Division for the rest of the war. The 1st Ox and Bucks landed in Normandy on 24 June 1944 with the rest of the 53rd (Welsh) Division. On 25 June Operation Epsom began what was intended to take the town of Caen — a vital objective for the British and Canadians that proved to be a formidable town to capture – it was unsuccessful. However, it did divert significant numbers of Germans away from the American troops. The Germans counter-attacked, the 1st Ox and Bucks moved to positions around the Odon bridgehead where it suffered from heavy German artillery fire. The Allies launched further attempts to capture Caen, the first Allied troops entered the city during Operation Charnwood on 9 July; by then, much of it had been destroyed. After holding the line the 1st Battalion's first major engagement with the enemy during the battle for Caen was the successful attack to capture the village of Cahier and a nearby mill. Fighting around Caen continued for much of the month, with the battalion sustaining significant casualties. The battalion later fought in the Second Battle of the Odon. In August it took part in an advance towards Falaise, known as Operation Totalize. The Allies reached and captured it. The battalion also captured Pierrefitte during the operation to close the Falaise pocket, encircling two German field armies, the Fifth and 7th, the latter of which was effectively destroyed by the Allies. The victory at Falaise signified the end of the Battle for Normandy. The 1st Battalion, Ox and Bucks then took part in the advance east, eventually entering Belgium in early September.

The 1st Buckinghamshire Battalion, a Territorial unit of the Ox and Bucks, was converted to a Beach Group battalion in March 1943 and was to provide the infantry support for the 6th Beach Group. In April 1943 the battalion moved to Scotland to commence training for its new role. The 1st Bucks formed part of the 6th Beach Group landing on Sword Beach on D-Day, 6 June 1944. An anti-tank platoon of 1st Bucks landed on the first tide of the invasion on D-Day, 6 June 1944. The remainder of 1st Bucks landed on the second tide of the invasion on D-Day. German gunners fired at the 1st Bucks from Lebisey wood and from the high ground at Houlgate; there was also much sniping from houses along the beachfront. The 1st Bucks established themselves on Queen Red and Queen White sectors of Sword Beach opposite La Breche on the easternmost landing site of the invasion. The role of the 1st Bucks was to organise the units on the landing beaches and was also deployed to defend the beachhead area from German counter-attacks as troops from the 3rd British Infantry Division moved inland. The 1st Bucks became part of 101 Beach Sub Area of No 6 Beach Group, 3rd Infantry Division and took part in the defence of Ouistreham in June. Lieutenant Colonel RDR Sale commanded both 1st Bucks and 6th Beach Group and after the Commander of No 5 Beach Group Lieutenant Colonel DHV Board was killed soon after landing, Sale assumed command of both Beach Groups approximately 7,000 men. Sale was awarded the George Medal for his role in limiting the damage caused by a German air attack, on an ammunition dump at La Breche, near Ouistreham, on 8 June. In July companies and platoons of 1st Bucks were transferred to other British divisions, including to the 2nd Ox and Bucks (the 52nd) in the 6th Airborne Division and to the Black Watch (Royal Highland Regiment) and other units in the 51st (Highland) Infantry Division, as replacements for the defence of the Normandy bridgehead. The battalion was later reformed but remained, for the rest of the war, on lines of communication duties. The 1st Bucks was placed into suspended animation in June 1946 and the battalion was finally disbanded on 7 August 1946.

===== Market Garden, the Ardennes offensive and crossing the Rhine =====
The invasion of the Netherlands began on 17 September; it was known as Operation Market Garden and was a combined land and airborne operation. The 1st Ox and Bucks took part in the ground operation in support of the airborne corridor to Arnhem. The 1st Ox and Bucks led the advance of 71st Infantry Brigade to the Wilhelmina canal where it encountered strong enemy resistance. The ground operation was intended to cross three bridges that had been taken by airborne troops and on into Germany. It would end at the furthest captured bridge at Arnhem (see Battle of Arnhem) – one end of which was taken by 1st Airborne Division, although the operation had clearly ended in failure by 25 September. The 1st Ox and Bucks subsequently took part in operations around the Lower Maas that took place during October and November, including forcing the enemy from its position holding a bridgehead over the River Maas, west of Roermond. Lieutenant Colonel JH Hare, the battalion's Commanding Officer, was killed during the battle for 's-Hertogenbosch on 28 October and was succeeded by Lieutenant Colonel Henry Howard of the 1st Battalion, Buffs (Royal East Kent Regiment), and a veteran of the East African Campaign and the Western Desert, who was to command the 1st Ox and Bucks for the rest of the war.

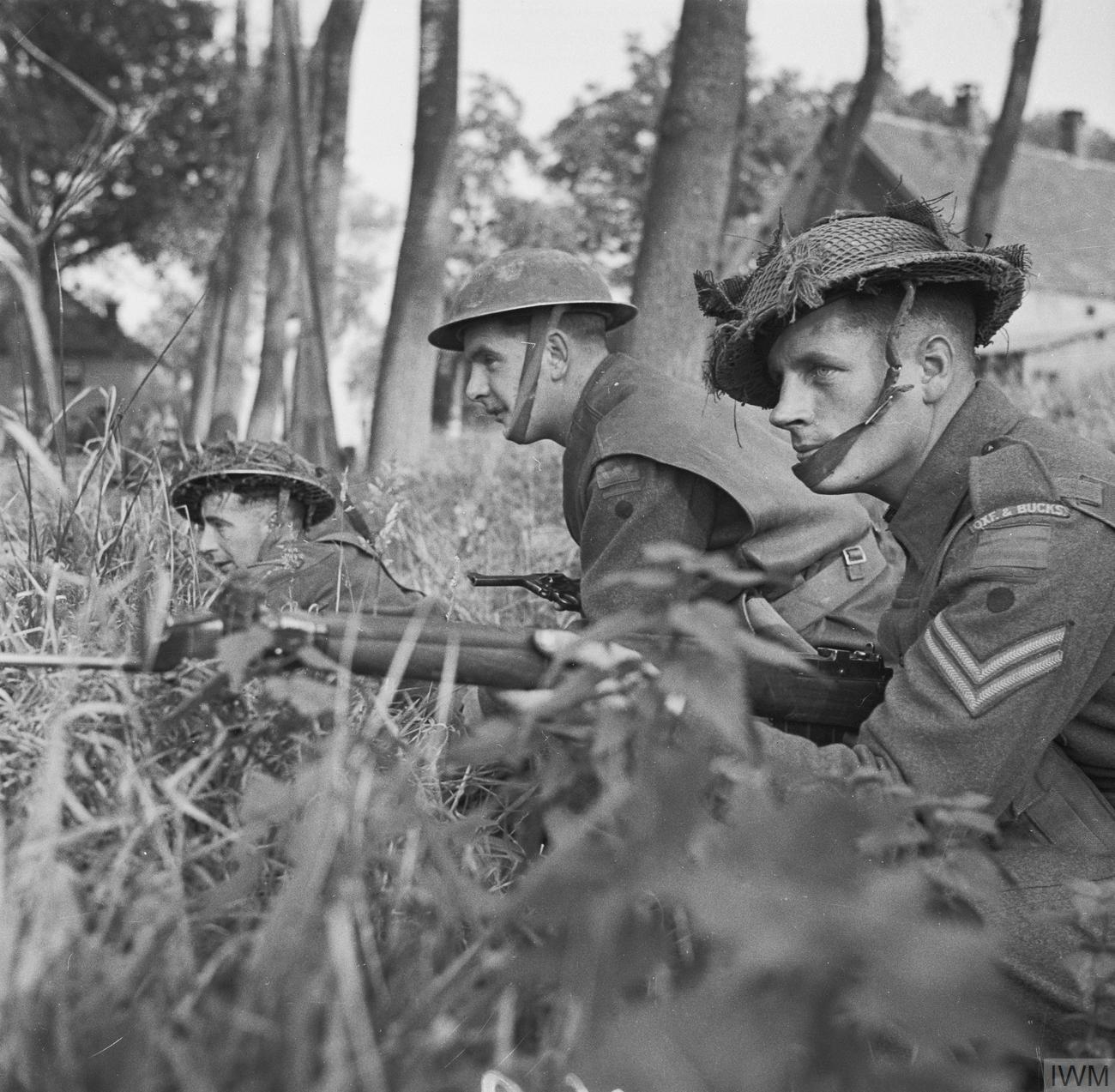
Men of the 1st Battalion, Oxford and Bucks Light Infantry, part of 71st Brigade of 53rd (Welsh) Division, in forward positions on the road to 's-Hertogenbosch (Den Bosch), taking cover in a ditch 24 October 1944

On 16 December 1944 the Germans launched their last-gasp major offensive of the war in the Ardennes forest that became known as the Battle of the Bulge. The 1st Battalion, Ox and Bucks, along with the rest of 53rd (Welsh) Division, was rushed to Belgium shortly afterwards to assist in the defence where the battalion endured terrible weather conditions, some of the worst Belgium had seen in years. The Allies launched a counter-attack in early January and the German offensive was defeated later that month, by which time the 53rd (Welsh) Division had been relieved and returned to the Netherlands soon afterwards in preparation for the invasion of Germany.

In February 1945 the 1st Battalion, Ox and Bucks was involved in the Allied invasion of the German Rhineland, including taking part in Operation Veritable (the Battle of the Reichswald): the five-division assault on the Reichswald Forest, where the battalion was involved in heavy fighting against German paratroopers and armour at the village of Asperberg. During Operation Veritable, 21-year-old Lieutenant Tony Paget, the youngest son of General Sir Bernard Paget, was posthumously awarded the Distinguished Service Order. The battalion crossed the River Rhine in late March and, attached to 7th Armoured Division, continued its eastwards advance, seeing action at among other places, Ibbenburen in April where it saw heavy fighting against determined German Marines; although the British succeeded in capturing the town. The battalion met fierce enemy resistance at Gross Hauslingen before continuing the advance through Dauelsen, Gyhum and Wehldorf and the 1st Ox and Bucks eventually reached the city of Hamburg – captured on 3 May by British forces – where they remained until the end of the war in Europe on 8 May 1945, Victory in Europe Day.

==== 2nd Battalion ====
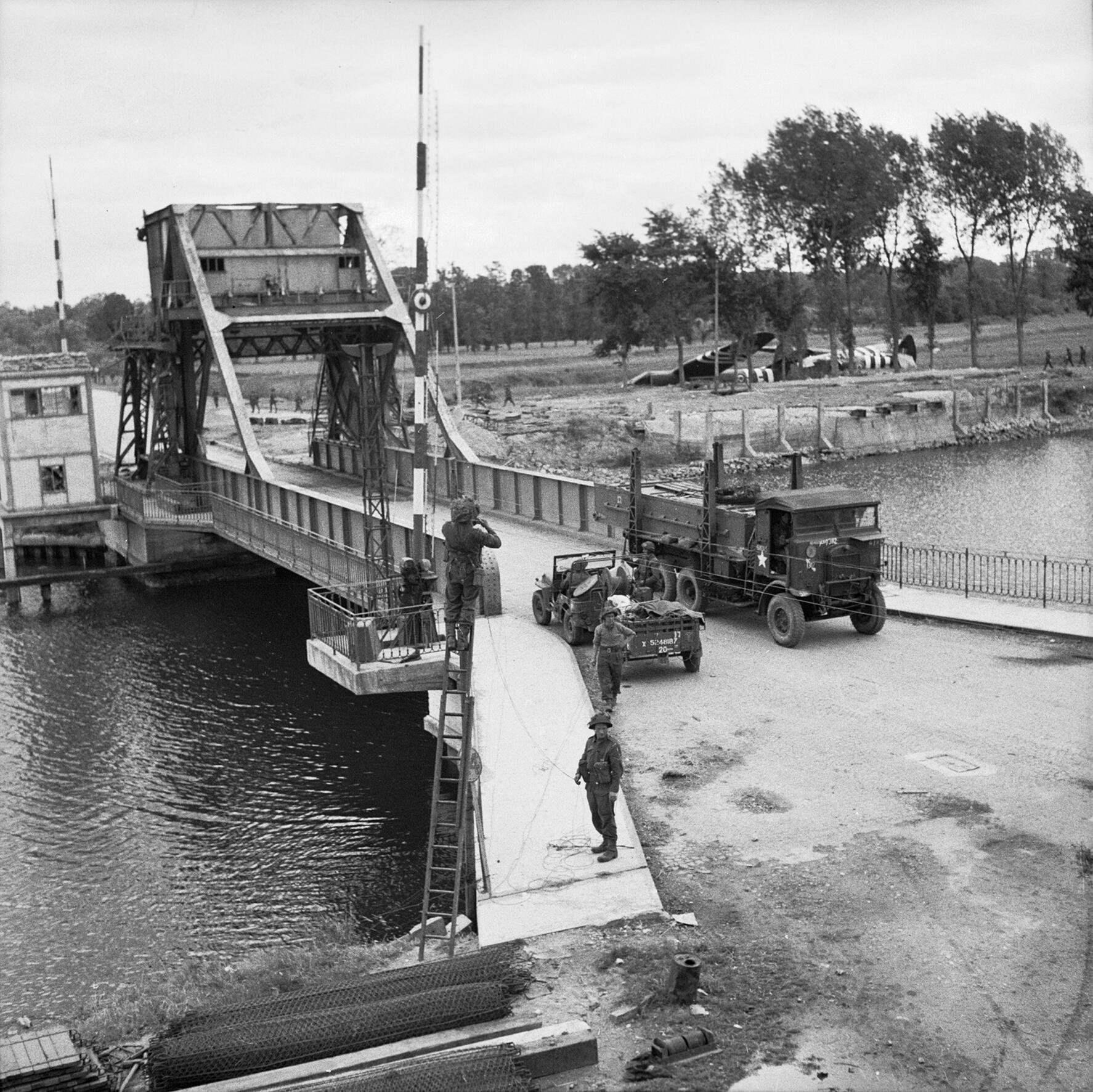
Transport moving across the Caen Canal Bridge at Benouville, June 1944. The bridge was renamed Pegasus Bridge after the mythical winged horse on the formation sign of British airborne forces

===== D-Day =====
Under the command of Lieutenant Colonel Rupert Brett, the 2nd Battalion, Oxford and Bucks Light Infantry returned to England in July 1940, after having served in British India and Burma for the last eighteen years. The battalion, now commanded by Lieutenant Colonel L.W. Giles, became part of the 31st Independent Brigade Group, serving alongside 1st Battalion, Border Regiment, 2nd Battalion, South Staffordshire Regiment and 1st Battalion, Royal Ulster Rifles, all Regular Army battalions, the latter two having also served in British India before the war.

In October 1941 the battalion, together with the rest of the 31st Brigade, was re-roled as an airborne battalion, specifically as glider infantry, and the 31st Brigade was redesignated the 1st Airlanding Brigade and became part of the 1st Airborne Division. In mid-1943 it was transferred, along with the 1st Royal Ulster Rifles, to become part of the 6th Airlanding Brigade in 6th Airborne Division. The 2nd Ox and Bucks were due to take part in the invasion of Sicily (Operation Husky); however in April 1943 the battalion was advised that the 1st Airborne and not the 6th Airborne were to be deployed in the landings. Just before the Normandy landings on 6 June 1944, a small force led by Major John Howard landed in six Horsa gliders and captured the Caen canal and Orne river bridges. Their success helped secure the eastern flank of the landings, prevented the German armour from crossing upriver and attacking into the flank of the British 3rd Infantry Division (who landed at Sword Beach at 07:25) and forced them to move further south via Caen.

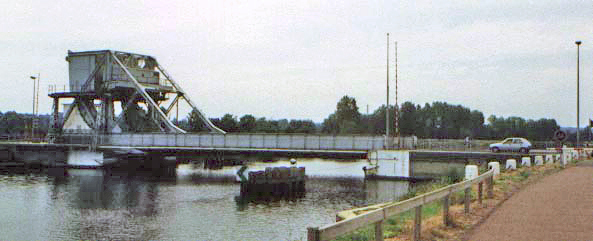
The original Pegasus Bridge after the war

D Company landed very close to their objectives at 16 minutes past midnight (the first Allied unit to land in France). The soldiers poured out of their battered gliders, completely surprising the German defenders, and taking the bridges within 10 minutes, losing two men – Lieutenant Den Brotheridge and Lance corporal Fred Greenhalgh – in the process. A further two officers and 14 soldiers were wounded during the battle for the bridges. Lieutenant Den Brotheridge led the first platoon to land at Pegasus Bridge followed one minute later by Lieutenant David Wood's platoon. Lieutenant Dennis Fox led the first platoon to land at Horsa Bridge. The glider carrying Captain Brian Priday and Lieutenant Tony Hooper's platoon, which was assigned to the capture of Horsa Bridge, landed at the bridge over the River Dives, some seven miles from where they intended. In spite of this, the occupants of the glider captured the River Dives bridge, advanced through the German lines towards the village of Ranville where they eventually rejoined the British forces. The Ox and Bucks platoons holding the bridges were relieved by the 7th Battalion of the Parachute Regiment at 03:00hours. The Germans attempted to re-capture the bridges, but were repulsed. Later in the day, at about 13:00hrs, Lord Lovat and elements of the Commandos of his 1st Special Service Brigade arrived to relieve the exhausted defenders, followed by the 3rd British Infantry Division. The operation was immortalised in the film The Longest Day.

As the first day of the landings closed, more reinforcements arrived as part of Operation Mallard, they included the rest of the 2nd Ox and Bucks. Lieutenant Colonel Mark Darell-Brown DSO, replaced Lieutenant Colonel Michael Roberts who had been injured during the landings and would remain in command of the battalion during the defence of the Ardennes and over the Rhine landing. On 7 June the battalion captured the small village of Herouvillette and then headed for the village of Escoville where it met some extremely determined resistance. Having experienced intense fighting with German troops supported by armour and unable to successfully dig-in and hold the village, the battalion withdrew, moving back to Herouvillette where it took part in its defence.

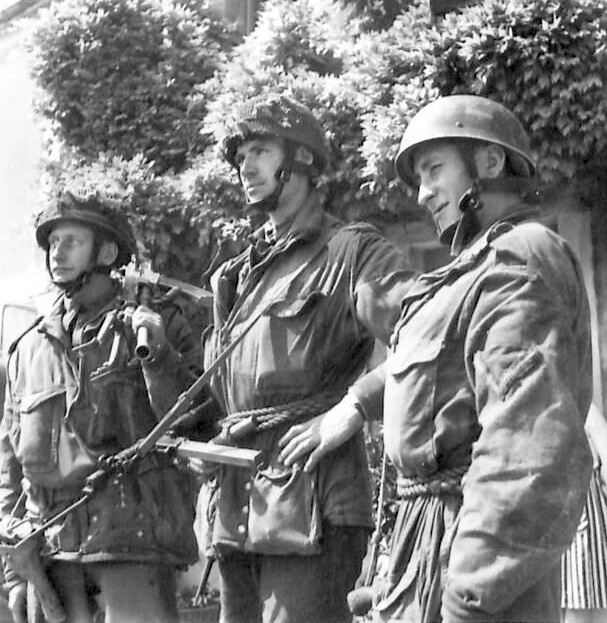
Men of D Company, 2nd Battalion, Ox and Bucks after capturing Pegasus Bridge.

On 13 June the battalion moved to Chateau St Come, approximately one mile south of Breville, where it remained until 20 June when it moved to Le Mesnil. On 26 June the battalion was ordered to occupy the village of Breville, moving back to Chateau St Come on 8 July. On 23 July the battalion returned to Le Mesnil and a week later to the trenches of Breville. On 7 August the battalion left Breville and apart from moving to Le Mesnil on 13 August for two days continued to hold the line at Chateau St Come on Bréville ridge. German army companies fighting the battalion each had a German officer and Sergeant however many of the soldiers were Russian and Eastern European. The battalion's time there was a period of static warfare. The bocage country of small fields and orchards surrounded by thick hedges was of greater advantage to the German defenders than to the Allied troops and the battalion sustained many casualties from snipers, mortar and shell fire.

The battalion took part in the British breakout and advance to the Seine which began later in August, known as Operation Paddle. It crossed the River Touques and the advance continued through St Philibert, La Correspondance, Pretreville and Malbortie. The march route was described at the time as " patted, kissed, given usually apple cider and then shot at." On 25 August the battalion was ordered to attack and capture the village of Manneville-la-Raoult where a German garrison was based and which was an enemy defensive strongpoint. After heavy fighting, during which the enemy used mortar and artillery fire, by nightfall the battalion had occupied the village and had captured a number of prisoners and transport. Lieutenant Freddie Scott was awarded a Military Cross for an action which drove the enemy from a position from where his platoon had come under heavy attack by machine-gun fire and grenades. The Battle for Manneville La Raoult was to be the last battle the battalion would fight in France. The following day, it moved 7 miles to Foulbec on the west bank of the River Seine.

D Company 2nd Ox and Bucks had only 40 soldiers remaining of the 181 who had taken part in the coup de main operation to capture Pegasus and Horsa Bridges on D-Day. Major John Howard was the only officer still serving; none of the sergeants and few corporals were left of those who had taken part in the operation. D Company had been in ninety-one days of continuous combat since 6 June 1944.

The 2nd Ox and Bucks, along with the rest of the 6th Airborne Division, was withdrawn to the United Kingdom on 2/3 September to recuperate and reorganise. The battalion went by truck to Arromanches, then were driven out to the Mulberry Harbour and then set sail for Portsmouth; travelling by train to Bulford Camp. 2nd Ox and Bucks casualties in Normandy amounted to nearly half of the battalion.

===== Ardennes offensive =====
The 2nd Battalion, Ox and Bucks and the rest of the 6th Airborne Division were rushed back to Belgium, by sea and land, to take part in the defence of the Ardennes, after the German offensive began in December 1944. The battalion left Tilbury on 23 December and travelled by rail to Dover and was on the first ship to enter Calais following its liberation. The 2nd Ox and Bucks arrived at Givet, in northern France close to the Belgium border, at 04.00hrs on 25 December to defend the town and bridgehead. By the time the battalion arrived in the Ardennes, in freezing weather conditions, the German offensive had largely lost its momentum. On 30 December the battalion moved to Drehance and took part in holding the bridgehead at Dinant. On 2 January 1945 the battalion moved to Custinne and then to Resteigne. On 4 January, C Company, commanded by Major Johnny Granville, was involved in heavy fighting, whilst in support of 13 Parachute Battalion in the village of Bure. The battalion moved to Rochefort on 9 January and by this time the battlefront was moving rapidly eastwards. The 2nd Ox and Bucks were based at Fromlennes from 17 to 24 January when the battalion moved 200 miles north to the Netherlands to Grubbenvorst, near Venlo, on the River Maas, to defend the position there, before returning by trucks to Calais and to UK by ship arriving at Bulford Camp, Wiltshire, on 28 February.

===== Crossing the Rhine =====
The 2nd Ox and Bucks were once again involved in a gliderborne air assault landing, known as Operation Varsity: the largest airborne operation in the history of warfare and the airborne support for Operation Plunder: the Rhine Crossing in late March 1945. The Germans were defending their last great natural barrier in the West and Operation Varsity which began on 24 March 1945 was the last major battle on the Western Front during the Second World War. The 2nd Ox and Bucks landed on the north-east perimeter of 6th Airborne Divisions's landing zone, the furthest east of any British Army unit, to capture bridges from the Germans. The battalion, like many others during the assault, suffered heavily as the Germans met the landing gliders with ferocious fire in the air and on the ground; the 2nd Ox and Bucks lost 400 killed or injured out of a total battalion strength of 800 men. The battalion's objective was to capture the line of the River Issel northwest of Hamminkeln. This included the Hamminkeln-Ringenburg road bridge, the railway bridge, Hamminkeln railway station and the road junction to the west. On 19 March the battalion moved to Birch camp, RAF Birch, near Colchester, Essex. The 2nd Ox and Bucks took off from Birch and Gosfield airfields at 06.30hrs on 24 March and the gliders moved southwards over the North Sea, then east over Brussels and landed in Hamminkeln area at about 10.00hrs. Each company was designated a landing zone in the area of its objective. On the approach to the landing area east of the Rhine the sky was full of aircraft. At Hamminkeln the gliders flew into a barrage of anti-aircraft fire; there were 4 enemy anti-aircraft guns gun-pits positioned near Hamminkeln station. During the landing which took only 10 minutes to complete there was thick smoke and dust from the area of Wesel and many of the battalion's 30 gliders were on fire and there were many casualties.

Bill Aldworth, the Quartermaster, was involved in a highly unusual landing. Seeing both the pilot and co-pilot of the glider slump over their joysticks as casualties, he took control of the aircraft and brought it safely down. The Commanding Officer, with tongue firmly in cheek, put him in for a Distinguished Flying Cross. He did not get it.

The 2nd Ox and Bucks casualties included 103 killed during the battle of the landing area. The battalion had lost half its strength, the 4 rifle companies were severely depleted and non-commissioned officers were frequently required to act as platoon commanders. The battalion saw very heavy fighting at Hamminkeln, where its objectives were the railway station and bridges over the River Issel between Hamminkeln and Ringenburg. Lieutenant Hugh Clark led a bayonet charge to take a road bridge for which he was awarded a Military Cross. CSM John Stevenson was awarded the Distinguished Conduct Medal for defeating several enemy attacks with a platoon he led on the east bank of the River Issel. The 2nd Ox and Bucks captured and held all its objectives. During the fighting German troops put out white flags of surrender and then opened fire. The Germans launched a number of counter-attacks, all of which were repelled. There was heavy shelling by the enemy near the Issel bridge. At midnight on 25 March the Cameronians (Scottish Rifles) relieved the battalion and by 06.00hrs on 26 March the unit was based in a farm on the west side of Hamminkeln. Later that morning the 2nd Ox and Bucks were informed that 6th Airborne Division would lead the advance across Germany.

The 2nd Ox and Bucks took a leading part in the division's 300-mile advance across Northern Germany, mostly on foot. The battalion marched to Rhede and then to Coesfeld where they remained until 31 March; they then moved towards Greven. D Company, led by Major, later Colonel John Tillett, was involved in heavy fighting at the Dortmund-Ems Canal; the company secured the position and captured more than a dozen anti-aircraft guns however sustained casualties from enemy artillery fire. The advance continued through Ladbergen and as the unit moved towards Lengerich it was assisted by the tanks of the 4th (Armoured) Battalion, Grenadier Guards. One of the 2nd Ox and Bucks companies came under heavy machine gun fire in the hills to the north east of the town. Following the capture of Lengerich the battalion then moved to Hasbergen, west of Osnabrück. On 3 April 2 Ox and Bucks was the first Allied unit to cross the Weser during which the unit was bombarded by enemy flak artillery. Following the crossing the battalion captured Wietersheim and were involved in house to house fighting to secure the village of Frille.

On 8 April the 2nd Battalion started on a long march towards Winzlar and moved into the corps reserve, being replaced in front by the 15th (Scottish) Infantry Division. 2nd Ox and Bucks moved on transport from Winzlar to Heitlingen. On 14 April the battalion advanced through Celle and spent the night in nearby woods and on 15 April whilst moving to the village of Nettelkamp, east of Uelzen, they were bombed by Jet planes. The 2nd Ox and Bucks encountered heavy enemy resistance at Kahlstorf, near Emern, on 16–17 April and sustained 25 casualties; there were many enemy bomb attacks and the battalion then moved to the hamlet of Gross Pretzier. The battalion moved through Rosche then Katzien and were at Ebstorf from 23 to 29 April. After leaving Ebstorf on foot, D Company 2nd Ox and Bucks took over as the spearhead of the British Army's advance across Northern Germany. A few miles north of Ebstorf D Company 2nd Ox and Bucks discovered a satellite of Bergen Belsen concentration camp. They were ordered to continue to pursue the enemy; the camp guards had already fled. The 2nd Ox and Bucks crossed the River Elbe on 30 April and the advance continued through Nostorf, Schwartow and Lutterstorf to Bad Kleinen, on the banks of the Schweriner See. On 2 May 1945 2nd Ox and Bucks moved eastwards along the same routes that units of the German army complete with heavy tanks, troop carriers and heavy artillery were travelling westwards determined to surrender to the British army and escape from the Soviet army. Many German soldiers and refugees were unable to move to the British army controlled area and were forced into Soviet captivity. The battalion linked up with the Soviet Red Army near the Baltic port of Wismar on 3 May 1945.

The 2nd Battalion, Oxfordshire and Buckinghamshire Light Infantry was selected to represent the British Army in providing the Guard of Honour which was commanded by Major Sandy Smith, of D Company, for the meeting between British commander Field Marshal Bernard Montgomery and his Soviet counterpart, Rokossovsky, at Wismar, on 7 May 1945. At Bad Kleinen the battalion was involved in organising the reception of the many German soldiers, including complete divisions, who had surrendered to the British army there and about 12,000 refugees who had fled to the village from the east. Whilst at Bad Kleinen small parties from the battalion visited the Red Army units. On 17 May Gunners from the 5th British Infantry Division relieved the battalion which then moved to the former German cavalry barracks at Lüneburg before flying home to the United Kingdom on 18 May 1945 and returning to Bulford Camp, Wiltshire.

==== T-Force ====
During the spring and summer of 1945, two companies of the 1st Buckinghamshire Battalion, along with the 5th Battalion, King's Regiment (Liverpool), were attached to a secretive unit known as T-Force. Their role was to locate Nazi scientists and military research facilities. The creation of T-Force had been inspired by James Bond author Ian Fleming who had created 30 Assault Unit, which worked alongside T-Force in Germany. They carried out investigations in Hanover, Bremen and Hamburg. Post-war, elements of the Bucks who had been attached to T-Force, were absorbed into No.1 T Force which continued to search for military secrets in the Ruhr.

=== Far East 1944-45 ===
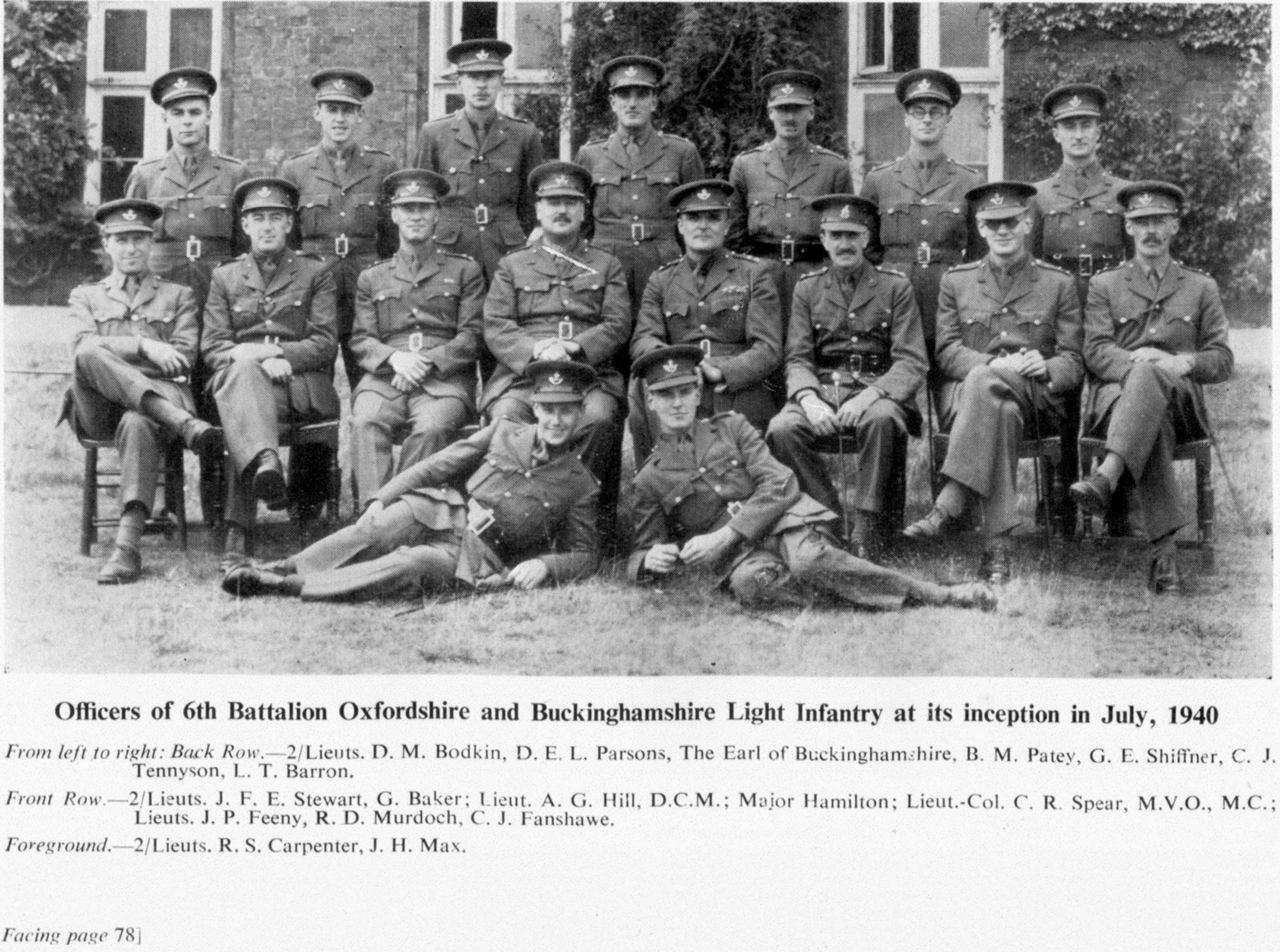
Officers of the 6th Battalion, Ox and Bucks in July 1940.

The 6th Battalion, Oxford and Bucks Light Infantry was a hostilities-only unit created in early July 1940, from a cadre of eighteen officers, five warrant officers, fifty-three Non-commissioned officers and sixty-five other ranks, nearly all of them from the Regular Army. The battalion was assigned to the 14th Infantry Group, later the 214th Independent Infantry Brigade (Home), serving alongside the 19th, 20th and 21st battalions of the Royal Fusiliers (City of London Regiment).

In mid 1942 the battalion was sent to India where they became part of the 74th Indian Infantry Brigade attached to 25th Indian Infantry Division. The 6th Ox and Bucks served on the Arakan Front during the advance down the west coast of Burma in 1944/45. The battalion fought at Akyab in 1944 and at the main Japanese Base at Tamandu in 1945. The 2nd Ox and Bucks following their return from Germany in May 1945 were due to be deployed to the Far East in South-East Asia Command. An advance party of the 2nd Ox and Bucks, led by Lieutenant Peter Gerahty, was in India in August 1945 preparing for an airborne assault on Malaya when the Japanese surrendered. The 6th Ox and Bucks was disbanded shortly after the end of the war, on 5 December 1945, and most of the men were either demobilised (mainly those who had been with the battalion since its creation) or transferred to the 1st Battalion, Royal Warwickshire Regiment.

=== North Africa and Italy (1942–45) ===
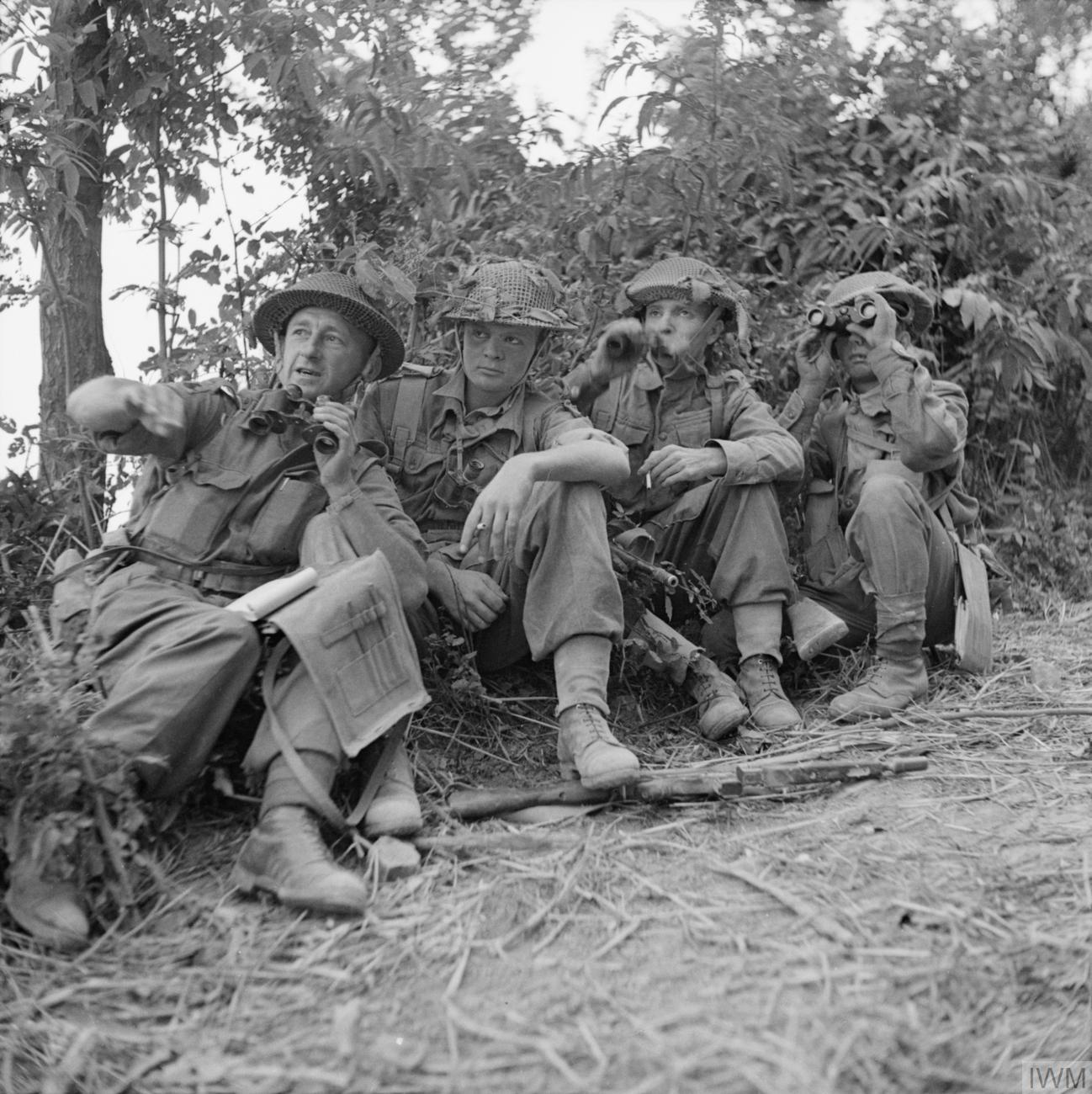
Platoon commanders of the 7th Battalion, Oxford and Bucks Light Infantry, of 167th (London) Brigade of 56th (London) Division, plan the attack on the village of Gemmano, 6 September 1944.

The 50th (Holding) Battalion were a hostilities-only battalion created on 3 June 1940, whose original job was to 'hold' men who were medically unfit, awaiting orders, on a course or returning from abroad. In October 1940 the battalion was redesignated the 7th Battalion. In February 1941, they became part of the 167th (London) Infantry Brigade, serving alongside the 8th and 9th battalions of the Royal Fusiliers, both Territorial units, and were attached to the 56th (London) Infantry Division.

Shortly before departing the United Kingdom the battalion was inspected by General Sir Bernard Paget, Commander-in-Chief, Home Forces, an officer who had served with the regiment before and during the Great War and whose son Lieutenant Tony Paget would later serve with the 1st Battalion of the regiment. With the rest of the division, they left the United Kingdom in late August 1942. The division was sent to Persia and Iraq Command and the battalion later fought in the final battle in the Tunisia Campaign in April 1943. The battalion made a successful attack at Enfidaville following a 3,000-mile road move from Iraq. In the Italian Campaign, 7th Ox and Bucks took part in the landings at Salerno in September 1943 and then the Anzio landings in February 1944 and sustained heavy casualties in both landings and came under command of the US Fifth Army, led by Lieutenant General Mark Wayne Clark, in both landings.

In late March 167 Brigade, together with the rest of 56 Division, was transferred to Egypt to rest and be brought back up to strength. After the fighting at Anzio the 7th Ox and Bucks were reduced to a mere 60 men, out a strength of 1,000, testimony to the severe fighting in the beachhead. Due to the casualties sustained the 7th Battalion was almost disbanded to allow the 1st Battalion, Welch Regiment, a Regular Army unit, to join the 56th Division. However, the 10th Battalion, Royal Berkshire Regiment, of 168th (London) Brigade, the junior battalion of the division and in an even worse state than 7th Ox and Bucks, was chosen instead, after that battalion had been reduced to only 40 men fit for duty.

Reinforced by large numbers of anti-aircraft gunners of the Royal Artillery who now found their original roles redundant, the battalion returned to Italy in July and fought in the severe battles around the Gothic Line near Gemmano, again sustaining heavy losses. Due to the recent heavy casualties, on 23 September 1944 the 7th Ox and Bucks was reduced to a small cadre and placed in 'suspended animation', transferred to the non-operational 168th Brigade and men were used as replacements for other infantry units in 56th Division, mainly for the 2/5th, 2/6th and 2/7th battalions of the Queen's Royal Regiment (West Surrey) of 169th (Queen's) Brigade. The reason for the disbandment was due to a severe shortage of infantrymen that plagued the British Army at the time, particularly so in the Mediterranean theatre.

=== Other battalions of the regiment ===
After the retreat to Dunkirk and being evacuated to England, the 4th Battalion was reformed and remained with the 145th Brigade until the brigade disbanded in November 1943 and the battalion was transferred to the 144th Infantry (Reserve) Brigade, still as part of the 48th Division, now designated the 48th Infantry (Reserve) Division and responsible for the training of all new Army recruits. On 24 July 1944 it was transferred to the 213th Brigade, which was later redesignated the 140th Brigade, part of the 47th Infantry (Reserve) Division, after the original 140th Brigade was disbanded. The battalion acted in a training capacity, sending drafts of replacements overseas and did not see active service again. In 1943 the battalion had sent 46 officers and 1,524 other ranks as replacements.

The 5th Ox and Bucks, part Territorial Army, was raised shortly before the outbreak of war in September 1939. The 5th Ox and Bucks was raised as a 2nd Line duplicate of the 4th Battalion. The battalion was assigned to the 184th Infantry Brigade, 61st Infantry Division. The 5th Ox and Bucks remained in a training role throughout the war and did not see active service outside the United Kingdom, aside from briefly serving in Northern Ireland.

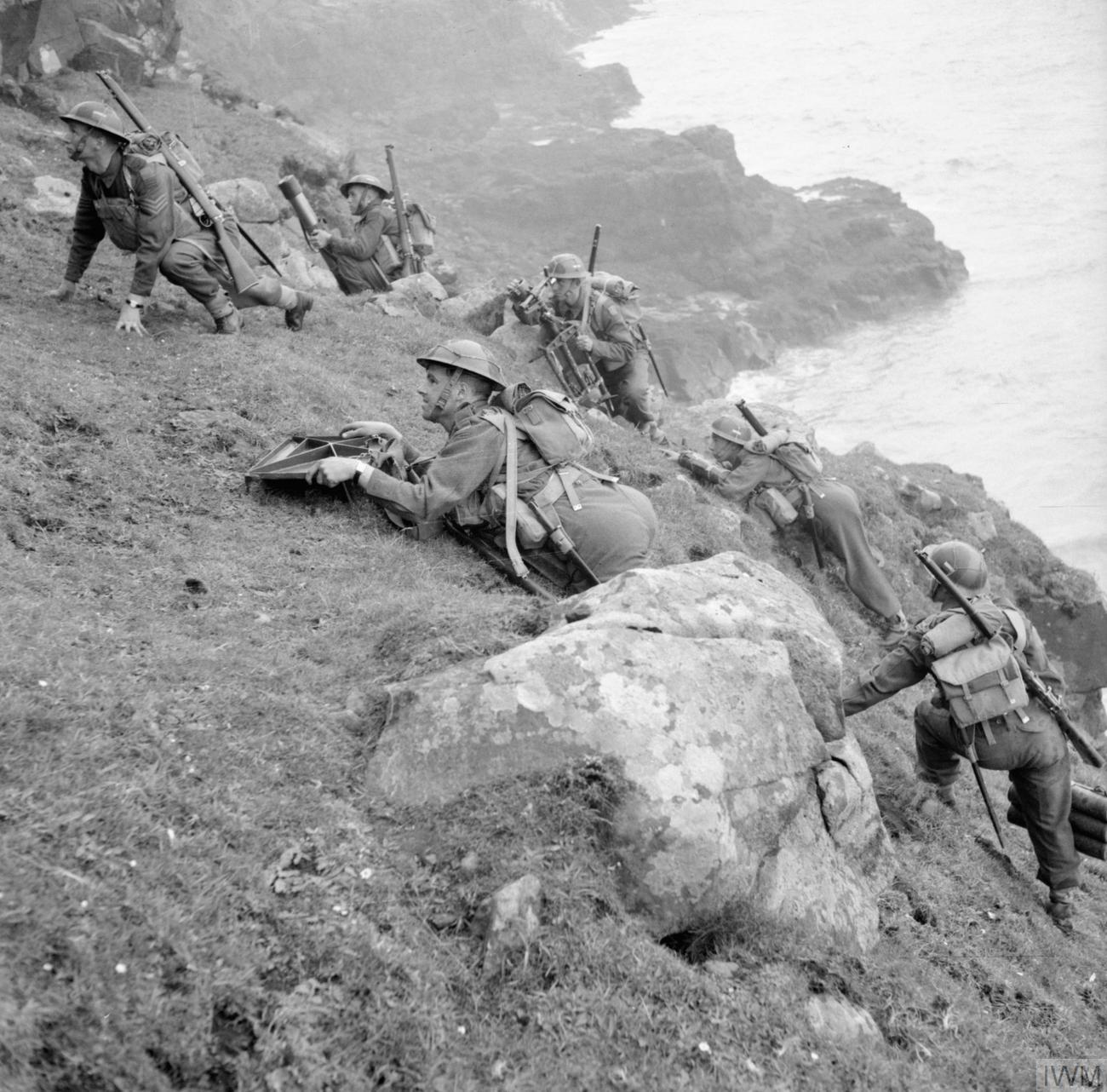
Men of the 5th Battalion, Oxfordshire and Buckinghamshire Light Infantry scramble up cliffs during 'toughening up' exercises by the sea at Castlerock in Northern Ireland, 14 July 1941.

The 2nd Buckinghamshire Battalion, a Territorial unit of the Ox and Bucks, was formed shortly before the outbreak of the Second World War. 2nd Bucks was part of 184th Infantry Brigade, 61st Infantry Division. The battalion served from January 1940 to June 1940 as part of the Portsmouth Garrison Reserve. The 2nd Bucks battalion, commanded by Lieutenant Colonel Edmund Richards, was stationed in Northern Ireland from June 1940 where the battalion's preparations for war included training exercises at Castledawson, County Londonderry. Richards had served as adjutant 2nd Ox and Bucks (52nd) in India and was mentioned in despatches for service in Burma before the Second World War. He was appointed OBE in 1938. He served in France with 1st Ox and Bucks (43rd) from September 1939 and was wounded during the fighting there. Richards, always known as " the Baron, " was A/Lieutenant Colonel in command of the 1st Ox and Bucks (43rd) before being evacuated from Dunkirk on 1 June 1940. In February 1943, the 2nd Bucks battalion left Northern Ireland and returned to England. The 2nd Bucks were posted as reinforcements to battalions deployed in the Normandy landings on 6 June 1944. The 2nd Bucks battalion was finally disbanded in July 1944.

== Post-Second World War era (1945–1966) ==
In October 1945, the 2nd Battalion, as part of 6th Airborne Division, arrived in Palestine as Britain's Imperial Strategic Reserve in the Middle East. Palestine was in a highly volatile political state and the battalion was extensively deployed on internal security duties and in assisting the civil authorities to keep the peace between the different communities. The 2nd Ox and Bucks were initially based at Mughazi camp, near Gaza, then at Ras-El-Fin, near Tel Aviv and at Nathanya, near Haifa. Shortly after arriving in Palestine Lieutenant Colonel Mark Darell-Brown was injured in a road traffic accident and Lieutenant Colonel Henry van Straubenzee replaced him as commanding officer of the 2nd Ox and Bucks (the 52nd). In March 1946 the battalion moved to Alamein camp in Jerusalem. On 15 April 1946, 6th Airlanding Brigade, which the battalion was still part of, was renumbered the 31st Independent Infantry Brigade. On 26 April 1946 the battalion wore their red berets for the final time, at a farewell to the division parade. The battalion was stationed in Jerusalem when the King David Hotel bombing took place on 22 July 1946. The 2nd Ox and Bucks moved to Athlit, near Haifa, in November 1946, then to Zerca in Transjordan before returning to Jerusalem in January 1947. The battalion formed part of 8th Infantry Brigade in May 1947 and moved to Khassa, near Gaza, in July 1947 and left Palestine in September 1947.

The 1st Battalion moved from the Rhineland to Berlin in November 1945. The battalion was based in Seesen in the Harz Mountains from March 1946 to May 1946 when it moved to Lüneburg. In August 1946 the 1st Battalion deployed to Trieste—the following year the Free Territory of Trieste—as part of the British-American force there. The battalion left in May 1947.

In 1948, following the independence of India, the British Government implemented substantial defence cuts, which involved all second battalions in the Line Infantry being abolished or amalgamated with their first battalions; this included the Ox and Bucks. Lieutenant Colonel Christopher Ward commanded the 2nd Ox and Bucks (the 52nd) to May 1947 and he was succeeded by Lieutenant Colonel CH Styles, who had enlisted in the regiment shortly after the ending of the 1st World War, and was to be the last Commanding Officer of the 2nd Ox and Bucks (the 52nd). Following amalgamation, the regiment was re-titled the 1st Battalion The Oxfordshire and Buckinghamshire Light Infantry, 43rd and 52nd.

In June 1949, the regiment moved to Greece during the civil war in that country. In October 1951, following a short period in Cyprus, the regiment deployed to the British-controlled Suez Canal Zone in Egypt. There, the regiment, commanded by Lieutenant Colonel Peter Young, saw active service performing internal security duties. The regiment, following disembarkation, was based for several days at a Transit Camp at Port Said and then moved to Gordon Camp at El Ballah. The regiment moved to Suez the following year. The Colonel Commandant of the regiment General Sir Bernard Paget visited the regiment in November 1952. The regiment left Suez in April 1953. At the Coronation of Queen Elizabeth II on 2 June 1953 the Oxfordshire and Buckinghamshire Light Infantry guard of honour was commanded by Captain Tod Sweeney.

In 1950 a Service of Dedication was held in the Regimental Chapel, Christ Church Cathedral, Oxford, for the Roll of Honour and Regimental Memorial Tablet for the Second World War.

The regiment was based at Belfast Barracks, Osnabrück, West Germany, from July 1953, as part of the British Army of the Rhine (BAOR). In May 1954, General Sir Bernard Paget presented new Queen's Colours to the regiment in Osnabrück. On 8 May 1955, the old Queen's Colours were presented to the Dean of Christ Church Cathedral by General Sir Bernard Paget for safekeeping in a ceremony at Christ Church Cathedral, Oxford. In October 1955, the regiment, led by Lieutenant Colonel Antony Read, commemorated the 200th anniversary of the founding of the 52nd Light Infantry. The bicentenary parade on 14 October 1955 included the last parading of the old colours. It was the last parade for General Sir Bernard Paget as Colonel Commandant of the Regiment. Bandmaster Arthur Kenney wrote a march " The 52nd Colours " to mark the occasion. The old 52nd Colours were marched for the last time; as they were taken off the parade ground, Reveille was sounded in recognition of the continued existence of the 52nd. Bandmaster, later Major Arthur Kenney was Bandmaster of the 1st Oxford and Bucks from 1949 to 1958 and the 1st Green Jackets (43rd and 52nd) to 1960 and then took up the same post with the Royal Artillery at Plymouth and finally with the Welsh Guards; he retired from the Army in October 1969. The regiment returned to Warley Barracks in Brentwood in July 1956.

The 1st Oxford and Bucks were due to be posted to Hong Kong however events in Egypt led to the regiment being deployed to Cyprus where it took part in operations against EOKA terrorists. The 1st Oxford and Bucks were called back from leave and on 10 August 1956 sailed from Southampton on HMT Dilwara and arrived at Limassol on 20 August 1956. The regiment moved to Nicosia, initially based at Strovolos and then at Oxford Camp, south of Nicosia. In November 1956 the regiment moved to Buckingham Camp, Polemidhia, near Limassol. The political situation in Cyprus had changed considerably since the regiment was last there in 1951. The regiment was deployed for most of its time in Cyprus in the Limassol area where it had replaced the Norfolk Regiment and the Ox and Bucks utilised their experience gained in Palestine following the Second World War. Major General Sir John Winterton Colonel Commandant visited the regiment in April 1957. On 1 April 1958, the regiment transferred from the Light Infantry Brigade to the Green Jackets Brigade and on 7 November 1958 the regiment was re-titled the 1st Green Jackets (43rd and 52nd) and in May 1959 left Cyprus for home—the first time it had been based in the UK since 1939. Lieutenant Colonel Andrew Martin had the distinction of being the last Commanding Officer of the Oxfordshire and Buckinghamshire Light Infantry and the first Commanding Officer of the 1st Green Jackets (43rd and 52nd). The last Colonel Commandant of the regiment was Major General Sir John Winterton who also became the first Colonel Commandant of the renamed regiment the 1st Green Jackets (43rd and 52nd).

== Regimental museum ==
The Soldiers of Oxfordshire Museum is based at Woodstock, Oxfordshire.

== Victoria Cross recipients ==
- Company Sergeant Major Edward Brooks (2/4th Battalion, Oxfordshire and Buckinghamshire Light Infantry)
- Lance-Corporal Alfred Wilcox (2/4th Battalion, Oxfordshire and Buckinghamshire Light Infantry)

== Other information ==
- Colonel-in-Chief: HM Carlos I of Portugal 20 February 1901 – 1908
- Anniversaries: Waterloo (18 June)
- Alliances:
  - 52nd Regiment (Prince Albert Volunteers) – Canada
  - Le Régiment de Joliette – Canada
  - 43rd Battalion (The Hindmarsh Regiment) – Australia
  - The Western Australia University Regiment
  - The Hauraki Regiment – New Zealand

== Battle honours ==
The regiment's battle honours borne on the colours were as follows:

- Early wars:
  - Quebec 1759, Martinique 1762, Havannah, Mysore, Hindoostan, Martinique 1794, Vimiera, Corunna, Busaco, Fuentes d'Onor, Ciudad Rodrigo, Badajoz, Salamanca, Vittoria, Pyrenees, Nivelle, Nive, Orthes, Toulouse, Peninsula, Waterloo, South Africa 1851–2–3, Delhi 1857, New Zealand, Relief of Kimberley, Paardeberg, South Africa 1900–02
- First World War:
  - Mons, Ypres 1914 '17, Langemarck 1914 '17, Nonne Bosschen, Somme 1916 '18, Cambrai 1917 '18, Piave, Doiran 1917 '18, Ctesiphon, Defence of Kut-al-Amara
- Second World War:
  - Cassel, Ypres-Comines Canal, Normandy Landing, Pegasus Bridge, Reichswald, Rhine, Enfidaville, Salerno, Anzio, Gemmano Ridge

== Regimental Colonels ==
Colonels of the regiment were:

- 1881–1893 (1st Battalion): Gen. Hon. Sir Augustus Almeric Spencer, GCB (ex 43rd Foot)
- 1881–1889 (2nd Battalion): Gen. John Leslie Dennis, CB (ex 52nd Foot)
- 1893–1913: Lt-Gen. Frederick Green Wilkinson, CB
- 1913–1917: Lt-Gen. Sir Fiennes Middleton Colvile, KCB
- 1917–1918: Maj-Gen. Thomas Manbourg Bailie
- 1918–1946: Maj-Gen. Sir John Hanbury-Williams, GCVO, KCB, CMG
- 1946–1955: Gen. Sir Bernard Charles Tolver Paget, GCB, DSO, MC
- 1955–1958: Maj-Gen. Sir Thomas John Willoughby Winterton, KCB, KCMG, CBE, CStJ (to 1st Green Jackets)
- 1958: Regiment redesignated as 1st Green Jackets (43rd and 52nd)

== See also ==
- Parachute Regiment
- Air Landing Regiment
- Oxfordshire and Buckinghamshire Light Infantry officers

== Sources ==
- J.B.M. Frederick, Lineage Book of British Land Forces 1660-1978, Volume I, 1984: Microform Academic Publishers, Wakefield, United Kingdom. ISBN 1-85117-007-3.
- Ambrose, Stephen (2003). Pegasus Bridge. Simon and Schuster. ISBN 978-0743450683.
- Beckett, Ian (2003). Discovering English County Regiments. Shire. ISBN 9780747805069.
- Bullock, Arthur (2009). Gloucestershire Between the Wars: A Memoir. The History Press. ISBN 978-0-7524-4793-3. Pages 58, 61–62, 75, 83, 91, 95.
- Edwards, Dennis (1999). The Devil's Own Luck Pegasus Bridge to the Baltic 1944-45. Pen & Sword Military. ISBN 978-0850528695.
- Joslen, H. F. (2003) [1960]. Orders of Battle: Second World War, 1939–1945. Uckfield, East Sussex: Naval and Military Press. ISBN 978-1-84342-474-1.
- Howard, John; Bates, Penny (2006). The Pegasus Diaries: The Private Papers of Major John Howard DSO. Pen and Sword. ISBN 978-1844154463.
- Murland, Jenny (2009). Departed Warriors: The Story of a Family in War. Matador. ISBN 978-1906510701.
- Paget, Julian (2008). The Crusading General: The Life of General Sir Bernard Paget GCB DSO MC. Pen & Sword Military. ISBN 978-18441-58102.
