= Henry Charles Howard =

Henry Charles Howard may refer to:

- Henry Charles Howard, 13th Duke of Norfolk (1791-1856)
- Henry Charles Howard, 18th Earl of Suffolk (1833-1898)
- Henry Charles Howard (MP for Penrith) (1850-1914)

== See also ==
- Henry Howard (disambiguation)
