= Harold Howard (disambiguation) =

Harold Howard is a Canadian martial artist.

Harold Howard may also refer to:

- Harold Palmer Howard (1866–1951), U.S. Army general
- Sir Seymour Howard, 1st Baronet (1886–1967), Harold Seymour Howard
- Harold Howard (Teenwolf)

== See also ==
- Harry Howard (disambiguation)
