= Henry Fitzalan-Howard =

Henry Fitzalan-Howard may refer to:

- Henry Fitzalan-Howard, 13th Duke of Norfolk (1791–1856), English peer and politician
- Henry Fitzalan-Howard, 14th Duke of Norfolk (1815–1860), English peer
- Henry Fitzalan-Howard, 15th Duke of Norfolk (1847–1917), English peer
- Henry FitzAlan-Howard, 2nd Viscount FitzAlan of Derwent (1883–1962), British peer
- Henry Fitzalan-Howard, Earl of Arundel (born 1987), heir apparent to the 18th Duke of Norfolk

== See also ==
- Henry Howard (disambiguation)
- Henry Fitzalan, 12th Earl of Arundel (1512–1580), English nobleman
