= Air landing regiment =

Air landing is a designation formerly held by glider-borne infantry units of the British Army (the equivalent units in American service were designated "glider infantry"). Air landing units included infantry battalions and light armoured regiments together with combat support and combat service support units and sub-units. The Glider Pilot Regiment provided the aircrew to fly the gliders into battle (who were trained to fight alongside them on the ground thereafter). Although combat support and combat service support units had the term air landing as part of their unit title, for example 1st Air landing Light Regiment Royal Artillery, infantry battalions' names remained unchanged. All units wore the maroon beret of the airborne forces with their own regimental capbadge.

== Development ==
The 1st and 6th Air landing Brigades formed integral parts of the 1st and 6th Airborne Divisions. Paratroopers tended to become scattered over a wide area on landing. This meant they took some time to compose a useful force, once on the ground. Although gliders needed a certain amount of ground to land, the soldiers aboard arrived in larger groups (the Horsa glider carried a complete platoon) and ready for combat.

The British Army had been inspired in creating both glider-borne units and parachute units by the example of the German Luftwaffe's Glider Troops which had played a major role in Germany's invasions of the Low Countries, and Crete.

== History ==
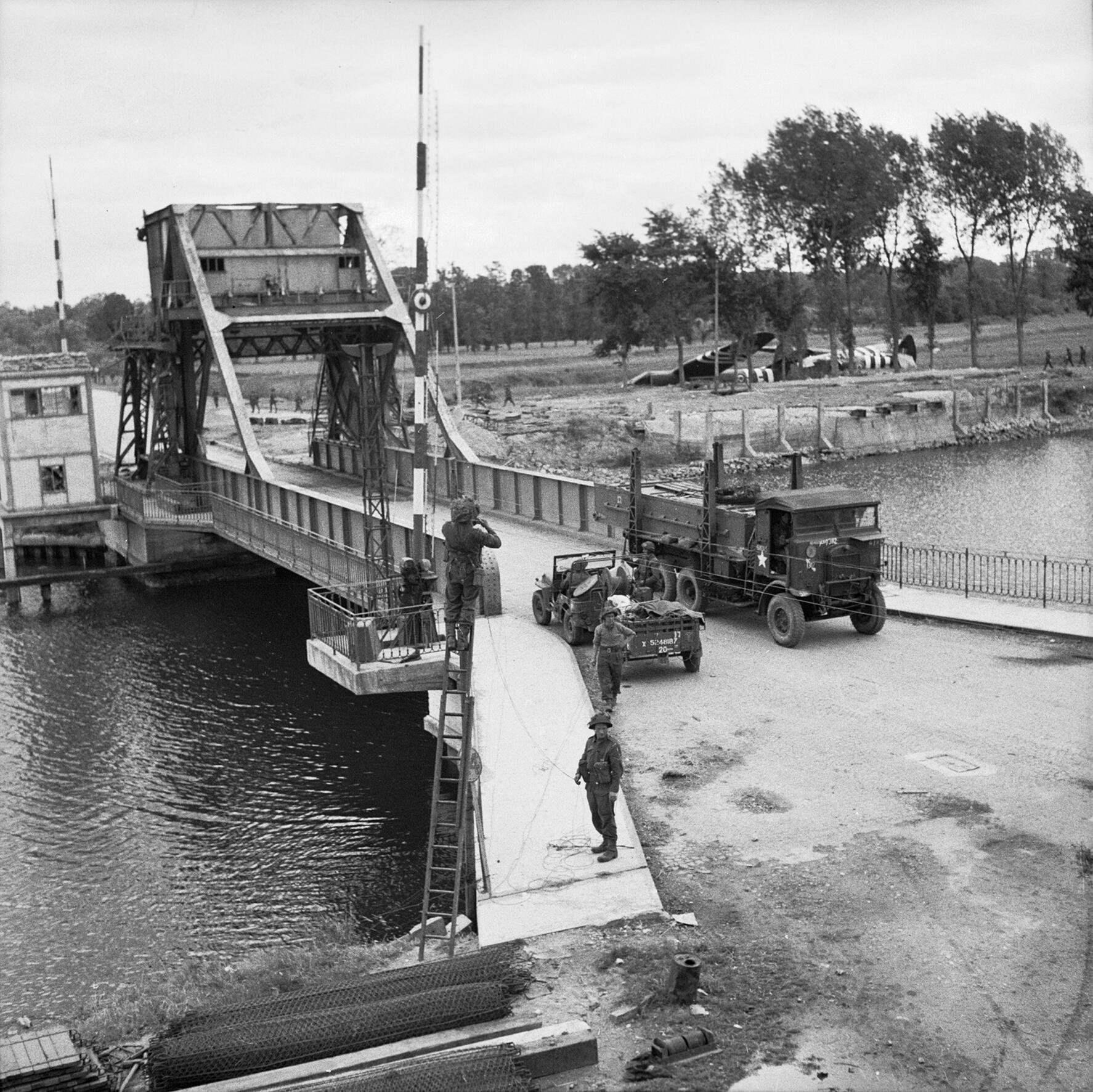
Two Horsa gliders used by air landing units in seizing the bridge over the Caen Canal, at Bénouville, are visible beyond the bridge, in June, 1944. The bridge was renamed Pegasus Bridge after the mythical winged horse on the formation sign of British airborne forces.

Probably the most famous action involving a glider-borne unit was that at Pegasus Bridge, the first landing of troops on D Day that captured the Caen canal and Orne river bridges. On the night of 5/6 June 1944, D Company, 2nd Battalion Oxfordshire and Buckinghamshire Light Infantry (2nd Ox & Bucks), led by Major John Howard, together with Royal Engineers and men of the Glider Pilot Regiment (totaling 181 men), were carried in six Horsa gliders to capture the vital bridge (later renamed "Pegasus Bridge") over the Caen Canal, and the bridge over the Orne River (since known as Horsa Bridge, and which is east of Pegasus Bridge). This was intended to secure the eastern flank to prevent German armor from reaching the area behind Sword Beach and interfering with the beach landings of the 3rd Infantry Division there.

Five of the Ox and Buck's gliders landed very close to their objectives at 16 minutes past midnight and poured out of their battered gliders, surprising the German defenders, and taking the bridges within 10 minutes. They lost two men, Lieutenant Den Brotheridge and Lance-Corporal Greenhalgh. One glider, assigned to the capture of Horsa Bridge, was landed at the bridge over the Rives Dives, some 7 miles from where they were meant to land. The soldiers captured the bridge, then moved through German lines towards the village of Ranville, where they eventually rejoined the British forces. The Ox & Bucks were reinforced half-an-hour after the landings by 7th Parachute Battalion, and linked up with the beach landing forces with the arrival of the British Commandos of the 1st Commando Brigade under the command of Brigadier Lord Lovat.
