= Rupert Brett =

British Army officer (1890–1963)

Brigadier Rupert Brett DSO JP DL
- Born: 14 November 1890
- Died: 10 November 1963 (aged 72)
- Military career
- Allegiance: United Kingdom
- Branch: British Army
- Service years: 1910−1945
- Rank: Brigadier
- Service number: 6334
- Unit: Oxfordshire and Buckinghamshire Light Infantry
- Commands: 2nd Battalion, Oxfordshire and Buckinghamshire Light Infantry; 165th Infantry Brigade
- Conflicts: First World War; Second World War
- Awards: Distinguished Service Order

Brigadier Rupert John Brett DSO JP DL (14 November 1890 – 10 November 1963) was a British Army officer.

== Military career ==
Brett was commissioned into the Oxfordshire and Buckinghamshire Light Infantry on 5 October 1910. He became commanding officer of the 1st Battalion, Royal Berkshire Regiment on the Western Front in March 1918 during the First World War and was appointed a Companion of the Distinguished Service Order on 15 December 1919.

He became Deputy Assistant Adjutant-General at the War Office in May 1928, an officer on the general staff in Egypt in September 1934 and commanding officer of the 2nd Battalion, the Oxfordshire and Buckinghamshire Light Infantry in October 1938 shortly before the start of the Second World War.

After the war began, in September 1939, he went on to be commander of the 165th Infantry Brigade in the UK in February 1940 and was briefly acting General Officer Commanding (GOC) of the 165th Brigade's parent formation, the 55th (West Lancashire) Infantry Division, in the UK in October 1941 before becoming Assistant Commandant of the Staff College, Camberley in 1943 and retiring from the army in 1945.
