= Alfred Wilcox =

English Victoria Cross recipient (1884-1954)

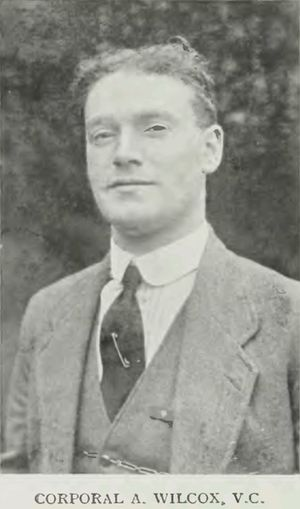
- Born: 16 December 1884; Birmingham, West Midlands
- Died: 30 March 1954 (aged 69); Birmingham
- Burial place: St Peter and St Paul Churchyard, Aston
- Military career
- Allegiance: United Kingdom
- Branch: British Army
- Service years: 1905 - 1909, 1915 - 1918
- Rank: Corporal
- Units: Royal Warwickshire Regiment; Royal Buckinghamshire Hussars; The Oxfordshire and Buckinghamshire Light Infantry
- Conflicts: World War I
- Awards: Victoria Cross

Alfred Wilcox VC (16 December 1884 – 30 March 1954), was an English recipient of the Victoria Cross, the highest and most prestigious award for gallantry in the face of the enemy that can be awarded to British and Commonwealth forces. Until 2006, he was the only recipient of the Victoria Cross whose exact resting place was unknown.

He was 33 years old, and a lance-corporal in the 2/4th Battalion, The Oxfordshire and Buckinghamshire Light Infantry, British Army during the First World War when the following deed took place for which he was awarded the VC.

On 12 September 1918 near Laventie, France, when his company was held up by enemy machine-gun fire at short range, Lance-Corporal Wilcox rushed to the nearest enemy gun, bombing it and killing the gunner. Being then attacked by an enemy bombing party, the corporal picked up enemy stick bombs and led his company against the next gun, finally capturing and destroying it. Then, left with only one man he continued bombing and captured a third gun. Going up the trench, bombing as he went, he captured a fourth gun and then returned to his platoon.

A nephew was Charles Wilcox GC. In 2006 his nephew John Wilcox, who had attended his Uncle's funeral in 1954, helped historian Chris Sutton in locating his grave in Aston Church. A service was held, and a memorial unveiled on 12 September 2006, 88 years to the day after he captured the guns.

He is named prominently on the front panel of the plinth unveiled at the new student accommodation in James Wolfe Road, Oxford on 16 August 2019 at the site of Cowley Barracks.

== Bibliography ==
- Gliddon, Gerald (2014) [2002]. Road to Victory 1918. VCs of the First World War. The History Press. ISBN 978-0750953610.
