= Henry Howard (Methodist) =

Henry Howard (21 January 1859 – 29 June 1933) was an Australian Methodist minister and writer.

== Early life ==
Howard was born in Melbourne, the son of Henry Howard - an accountant - and his wife Mary Ann, née Graham. Howard came from a poor background.
