= Harry Howard (Australian footballer) =

Australian rules footballer

Personal information
- Full name: Harry Schuldham Howard
- Born: 1 September 1873; Portland, Victoria
- Died: 25 October 1945 (aged 72); Melbourne
- Original team: Fitzroy Juniors

Playing career^{1}
Years	Club	Games (Goals)
1897	Carlton	2 (0)
- ^{1} Playing statistics correct to the end of 1897.

Harry Schuldham Howard (1 September 1873 – 25 October 1945) was an Australian rules footballer who played with Carlton in the Victorian Football League (VFL).
