= Henry Howard (British Army officer) =

British Army officer (1915–2000)

- Born: 25 February 1915
- Died: 6 May 2000 (aged 85)
- Military career
- Allegiance: United Kingdom
- Branch: British Army
- Service years: 1935−1953
- Rank: Lieutenant Colonel
- Service number: 64577
- Unit: Buffs (Royal East Kent Regiment)
- Commands: 1st Battalion, Oxfordshire and Buckinghamshire Light Infantry; 2nd Reconnaissance Regiment
- Conflicts: World War II
- Awards: Distinguished Service Order; Military Cross

Lieutenant Colonel Frederick Henry Howard DSO MC* (25 February 1915 – 6 May 2000) was a British Army officer who was twice awarded the Military Cross for gallantry and was later awarded the Distinguished Service Order for leadership whilst commanding the 1st Battalion of the Oxfordshire and Buckinghamshire Light Infantry (the 43rd) in the North-West Europe campaign during the Second World War. He later became Laird of the Hebridean island of Gometra.

== Early life ==
Frederick Henry Howard was educated at Gresham's School, Holt, and at the Royal Military College, Sandhurst. He was commissioned into the Buffs (Royal East Kent Regiment), known as the Buffs, in 1935.

== Early Military career ==
Howard was awarded his first Military Cross while serving with the 2nd Battalion, Royal East Kent Regiment, during the Arab Revolt in Palestine in 1936. His platoon, while on internal security duties, came under heavy fire near Tarshiha and despite being injured his action led to the assailants being forced from their position on a hillside. He was seconded to the King's African Rifles and served in the East African campaign against the Italians in Kenya, Somaliland and Abyssinia, where he was mentioned in dispatches. Howard rejoined the regiment in 1941 and served with the 1st Battalion in the Western Desert campaign in North Africa. He was awarded his second Military Cross for leading an attack on the night of 21 January 1943 down the Tarhuna Pass towards Tripoli which succeeded in driving the enemy back two miles. He later attended the Staff College at Haifa.

== North West Europe ==
Howard was appointed to command the 1st Battalion the Oxfordshire and Buckinghamshire Light Infantry (the 43rd) in 1944. He led his battalion into the Netherlands, the Ardennes, the Battle of the Reichswald, the Rhine crossing and during the advance across Germany to Hamburg, where it remained until the end of the War in Europe. He was awarded the Distinguished Service Order for his leadership during the crossing of the River Roer on the border of the Netherlands and Germany.

== After the Second World War ==
In 1946 Howard was appointed to command the 2nd Reconnaissance Regiment in Singapore. He later became second-in-command of the 3rd Hussars in Bielefeld. His final military appointment was as commander of the Tactical Wing at Lulworth, Dorset. He retired from the Army in 1953.

== Later life ==
In 1940 Howard married Estelle Georgette Sharp, second daughter of Mrs. W. B. Atkinson of Londiani, Kenya and the late Mr. Sharp. In 1952 he married secondly Jean Parnell, second daughter of the 6th Lord Congleton, with whom he was to have four children. His wife inherited an estate on the Isle of Ulva, where they settled and he farmed cattle and sheep. He added to the property by buying the neighbouring island of Gometra.

Henry Howard died on 6 May 2000, at the age of 85.
