= Regimental museum =

Museum dedicated to the history of a specific army regiment

In countries whose armies are organised on a regimental basis, such as the army of the United Kingdom, a regimental museum is a military museum dedicated to the history of a specific army regiment.

== List of regimental museums in the UK ==
In addition to those listed below, many more units (including Yeomanry, Militia and Volunteer regiments) have museums or exhibition spaces, some open only by appointment; for fuller information see the Ogilby Trust website (below).

=== England ===
- The Army Medical Services Museum is based at Mytchett in Surrey
- The Museum of Barnstaple and North Devon (for the Royal Devon Yeomanry, Royal 1st Devon Yeomanry and the Royal North Devon Yeomanry) is based in Barnstaple
- The Bedfordshire and Hertfordshire Regiment gallery is part of Wardown Park Museum in Luton
- The Border Regiment and its successors have a gallery at Cumbria's Museum of Military Life in Carlisle Castle
- The Buffs (Royal East Kent Regiment) still has some exhibits at Beany House, although most of the collection was subsumed into the National Army Museum in 2000
- The Cheshire Military Museum (for The Cheshire Regiment, 3rd Carabiniers, 5th Royal Inniskilling Dragoon Guards and Cheshire Yeomanry) is based at Chester Castle
- The Devonshire and Dorset regimental collections are displayed in the Keep Military Museum, Dorchester
- The Duke of Cornwall's Light Infantry regimental collections are displayed at Cornwall's Regimental Museum at Victoria Barracks in Bodmin
- The Duke of Wellington's Regiment Museum is based at Bankfield House, in Halifax, Yorkshire
- The Durham Light Infantry Collection is based at "The Story" at Mount Oswald in Durham.
- The East Yorkshire regimental collection is housed in Wilberforce House, Hull.
- The Essex Regiment Museum is based at Oaklands Park in Chelmsford
- The Fusilier Museum (Lancashire) is based in Bury, Greater Manchester
- The Fusiliers Museum (London) is based in the Tower of London
- The Fusiliers Museum of Northumberland is based in Alnwick Castle
- The Soldiers of Gloucestershire Museum (Gloucestershire Regiment and Royal Gloucestershire Hussars) is based at the historic docks in Gloucester
- The Green Howards Regimental Museum is based in Richmond, North Yorkshire
- The Guards Museum is based at Wellington Barracks in London
- The Gurkha Museum is based at Peninsula Barracks in Winchester
- The Herefordshire Light Infantry Museum is based in Hereford
- The Honourable Artillery Company Museum is at Armoury House in London
- HorsePower: The Museum of the King's Royal Hussars is based at Peninsula Barracks in Winchester
- The Household Cavalry Museum is based at Horse Guards in London
- The Inns of Court & City Yeomanry Museum is based at Stone Buildings in London
- The Kent and Sharpshooters Yeomanry Museum is at Hever Castle, Kent
- The King's Own Royal Regiment Museum is part of the Lancaster City Museum in Lancaster
- The King's Own Scottish Borderers Regimental Museum, is based at Berwick Barracks in Berwick-upon-Tweed
- The Kings Own Yorkshire Light Infantry Museum is based at Doncaster Museum and Art Gallery in Doncaster
- The King's Regiment Museum collection is displayed in the Museum of Liverpool
- The Museum of the 14th/20th King's Hussars was in the Museum of Lancashire in Preston until it closed in 2016
- The Lancashire Infantry Museum (for the Duke of Lancaster's Regiment and the Queen's Lancashire Regiment) is based at Fulwood Barracks in Preston
- The Museum of the Adjutant General's Corps is based at Peninsula Barracks in Winchester
- The Museum of the Manchesters was based at Ashton Town Hall but remains closed while the town hall is being redeveloped
- The Middlesex Regiment museum, formerly in Bruce Castle, closed in 1992 and was absorbed into the National Army Museum
- The Newcastle Discovery Museum includes the regimental museum of the Light Dragoons and the Northumberland Hussars
- The Museum of the Northamptonshire Regiment is based at Abington Park
- The Soldiers of Oxfordshire Museum (for the Oxfordshire and Buckinghamshire Light Infantry and the Queen's Own Oxfordshire Hussars) is based at Woodstock, Oxfordshire
- The Parachute Regiment and Airborne Forces Museum is based at Duxford, Cambridgeshire
- The Queen's & Princess of Wales's Royal Regiment Regimental Museum is based at Dover Castle
- The Queen's Own Hussars Museum is based at Lord Leycester Hospital in Warwick
- The Queen's Own Royal West Kent Regiment Museum is based at Maidstone Museum & Art Gallery in Maidstone
- The Rifles Museum is based at Peninsula Barracks in Winchester
- The Rifles Berkshire and Wiltshire Museum is based in Salisbury
- The Royal Anglian Regiment Museum is based at Duxford in Cambridgeshire
- The Royal Army Physical Training Corps Museum is based on Fox Lines in Aldershot in Hampshire.
- The Royal Artillery Museum was based at Woolwich until it closed in 2016.
- The REME Museum is based at MoD Lyneham
- The Royal Engineers Museum is based at Gillingham in Kent
- The Royal Green Jackets (Rifles) Museum is based at Peninsula Barracks in Winchester
- The Royal Hampshire Regiment Museum is based at Lower Barracks in Winchester
- The Royal Lancers and Nottinghamshire Yeomanry Museum is based at Thoresby Hall in Nottinghamshire
- The Royal Leicestershire Regiment Museum is part of Newarke Houses Museum in Leicester
- The Royal Lincolnshire Regiment and Lincolnshire Yeomanry collections are displayed in Lincoln's Museum of Lincolnshire Life
- The Royal Logistic Corps Museum is based at MOD Worthy Down near Winchester in Hampshire
- The Royal Marines Museum is in the course of relocating to Portsmouth Dockyard
- The Royal Norfolk Regimental Museum is based in Norwich Castle
- The Royal Regiment of Fusiliers Museum (Royal Warwickshire) is based at St John's House in Warwick
- The Royal Signals Museum is based at Blandford Camp in Dorset
- The Royal Sussex Regiment Museum and that of the Queen's Royal Irish Hussars is based at Eastbourne Redoubt in Sussex
- The Sherwood Foresters Museum is based in Nottingham Castle
- The Shropshire Regimental Museum is based at Shrewsbury Castle
- The Soldier's Story Gallery (for the Sherwood Foresters (Nottingham and Derbyshire) Regiment, the 9th/12th Royal Lancers and the Derbyshire Yeomanry) is based at Derby Museum and Art Gallery
- The Somerset Military Museum is based at Taunton Castle
- The Staffordshire Regiment Museum is based at Whittington Barracks near Lichfield
- The Suffolk Regiment Museum is based at Gibraltar Barracks in Bury St Edmunds
- The Surrey Infantry Museum was based at Clandon Park House, near Guildford until it was destroyed in a fire in April 2015
- The Tank Museum, the museum of the Royal Tank Regiment, is at Bovington Camp in Dorset
- The Worcester Soldier galleries (for the Worcestershire Regiment and the Queen's Own Worcestershire Hussars) is part of the Worcester City Art Gallery & Museum
- The York and Lancaster Regimental Museum is based at Clifton Park in Rotherham
- The York Army Museum (for the Royal Dragoon Guards, Prince of Wales's Own Regiment of Yorkshire and the Yorkshire Regiment) is based at the Tower Street drill hall in York

=== Northern Ireland ===
- The Royal Irish Fusiliers Museum is based in Armagh
- The Royal Ulster Rifles Museum is based in Belfast
- The Inniskillings Museum (for the Royal Inniskilling Fusiliers and the 5th Royal Inniskilling Dragoon Guards) is based at Enniskillen Castle

=== Scotland ===
- The Gordon Highlanders Museum is based in Aberdeen
- The Royal Scots Dragoon Guards Museum is based at Edinburgh Castle
- The Museum of the Royal Scots (The Royal Regiment) and the Royal Regiment of Scotland is based at Edinburgh Castle
- The Argyll and Sutherland Highlanders Regimental Museum is based at Stirling Castle
- The Highlanders' Museum (for the Queen's Own Highlanders (Seaforth and Camerons)) is based at Fort George
- The Black Watch Museum is based at Balhousie Castle in Perth
- The Royal Highland Fusilier Museum (for the Royal Scots Fusiliers and the Highland Light Infantry) is based at Sauchiehall Street in Glasgow
- The Cameronians Museum is part of the Low Parks Museum in Hamilton, South Lanarkshire

=== Wales ===
- The Royal Welch Fusiliers Museum is based at Caernarfon Castle
- The Regimental Museum of The Royal Welsh (for the South Wales Borderers and the Monmouthshire Regiment) is based at The Barracks, Brecon
- Firing Line: Cardiff Castle Museum of the Welsh Soldier (for the 1st The Queen's Dragoon Guards and the Royal Welsh) is based at Cardiff Castle
- The regimental museum of the Royal Monmouthshire Royal Engineers is based in Monmouth Castle
