= Fusiliers Museum =

Fusiliers Museum may refer to:

- Fusilier Museum, Bury, Greater Manchester
- Fusiliers Museum (London), Tower of London
- Fusiliers Museum of Northumberland, Alnwick, Northumberland
- Royal Irish Fusiliers Museum, Armagh, County Armagh, Northern Ireland; see Royal Irish Fusiliers § Royal Irish Fusiliers Museum
- Royal Regiment of Fusiliers Museum (Royal Warwickshire), Warwick, Warwickshire
- Royal Welch Fusiliers Museum, Caernarfon, Gwynedd, Wales
