= Adjutant General's Corps =

Corps of the British Army

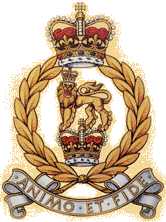
- Cap badge of the AGC
- Active: 6 April 1992 – present
- Allegiance: United Kingdom
- Branch: British Army
- Role: Administrative services
- Garrison/HQ: Worthy Down Camp, Winchester
- Mottos: Animo et fide (With resolution and fidelity)
- March: Quick March. Pride of lions; Slow march. Greensleeves

Commanders
- Colonel-in-Chief: The Duchess of Gloucester

Insignia
- Tactical Recognition Flash

The Adjutant General's Corps is a corps in the British Army responsible for many of its general administrative services, named for the Adjutant-General to the Forces (now the Commander Home Command). As of 2002, the AGC had a staff of 7,000 people.

== History ==
The corps was formed on 6 April 1992 through the amalgamation of several separate services:

- Staff clerks from the Royal Army Ordnance Corps
- Army Legal Corps
- Corps of Royal Military Police
- Military Provost Staff Corps
- Royal Army Educational Corps
- Royal Army Pay Corps
- Women's Royal Army Corps
- Clerks from all others Arms and Services joined in April 1993

In October 2022, to celebrate the Corps' 30th anniversary, a parade was held in Winchester, in the presence of The Duchess of Gloucester, Deputy Colonel in Chief.

== Organisation ==
The AGC is organised into the following branches:

=== Staff and Personnel Support (SPS) ===
The SPS branch provides specialist HR, Finance, Accounting and ICT support to the British Army, during peacetime and on operations. Its personnel serve alongside and administer every unit in the British Army. The branch also provides clerical support to headquarters at all levels including various departments of the MOD Head Office in Whitehall and the Permanent Joint Headquarters (PJHQ) at Northwood working alongside counterparts in the Royal Navy and RAF, as well as in divisional and brigade headquarters and at unit and sub-unit level through Land Forces. In addition to HR, administrative and clerical support, the SPS Branch also maintains the Army Welfare Service, where its small cohort of Army Welfare Workers - trained social and occupational welfare specialists - provide therapeutic support to Army personnel and their families.

In 2011, Gurkha clerks and administrative personnel who, up to that point, had served under the Royal Gurkha Rifles cap badge, were brought into a single unit titled the Gurkha Staff and Personnel Support Company (GSPS Coy). Following the traditions of the Queen's Gurkha Engineers, Queen's Gurkha Signals and the Queen's Own Gurkha Logistic Regiment, the GSPS Coy has a cap badge that combines elements of both its parent corps (the AGC) and the Brigade of Gurkhas, of which it is a constituent alongside the other Gurkha units in the British Army.

=== Provost (AGC Pro) ===
The AGC Pro unifies two former services which, while no longer independent, retain their identities and cap badges. The Royal Military Police (RMP) is the Army's police force, while the Military Provost Staff (MPS) provides guards for military prisons. The newly formed Military Provost Guard Service (MPGS) is also part of this branch.

=== Educational and Training Services ===
The ETS Branch has the responsibilities of the former Royal Army Educational Corps, it is an all officer branch with around 400 serving members. In 2006 the former RAEC cap badge of a 'fluted flambeau with five flames, with crown and scroll' was reintroduced, with 'ETS' replacing 'R.A.E.C.' on the scroll.

=== Army Legal Services ===
The ALS Branch provides legal advice to all levels of the Army. It retains the cap badge of the former Army Legal Corps. Prior to its amalgamation into the AGC, it was an independent corps in its own right. Its personnel are all qualified lawyers and commissioned officers.

=== CRHQ ===
Almost all corps of the British Army contain a CRHQ (Central Reserve Headquarters) which oversee training for the corps along with controlling specialist units and formations. The Adjutant General's Corps currently maintains two specialist pools:

- CRHQ Adjutant General's Corps Educational Training and Services Specialist Pool
- CRHQ Adjutant General's Corps Staff and Personnel Support Specialist Pool

== Museum of the Adjutant General's Corps ==
The Museum of the Adjutant General's Corps is based at Peninsula Barracks in Winchester. It is one of several regimental museums that are part of Winchester's Military Museums.

| Preceded by Corps of Royal Electrical and Mechanical Engineers | Order of Precedence | Succeeded by Royal Army Veterinary Corps |
