= List of museums in Warwickshire =

This list of museums in Warwickshire, England contains museums which are defined for this context as institutions (including nonprofit organizations, government entities, and private businesses) that collect and care for objects of cultural, artistic, scientific, or historical interest and make their collections or related exhibits available for public viewing. Also included are non-profit art galleries and university art galleries. Museums that exist only in cyberspace (i.e., virtual museums) are not included.

Name	Image	Town/City	Region	Type	Summary
Anne Hathaway's Cottage		Shottery	Stratford-on-Avon	Historic house	Tudor thatched farmhouse, childhood home of Anne Hathaway, the wife of William Shakespeare, gardens
Arbury Hall		Nuneaton	Nuneaton and Bedworth	Historic house	Mixture of Tudor and 18th-century Gothic architecture
Baddesley Clinton		Lapworth	Warwick	Historic house	Operated by the National Trust, Elizabethan manor house
Bedworth Heritage Centre		Bedworth	Nuneaton and Bedworth	Local	local history, culture
British Motor Museum formerly Heritage Motor Centre		Gaydon	Stratford-on-Avon	Automotive	British cars, manufacturing history
Charlecote Park		Wellesbourne	Stratford-on-Avon	Historic house	Operated by the National Trust, 16th-century country house in a deer park, Victorian interior
Chilvers Coton Heritage Centre		Nuneaton	Nuneaton and Bedworth	Local	local history, culture, Victorian schoolroom
Compton Verney House		Compton Verney	Stratford-on-Avon	Art	Art gallery located in a Robert Adam mansion set in 120 acres (0.49 km^{2}) of parkland, collections include Neapolitan art from 1600 to 1800, Northern European medieval art, British portraits, Chinese bronzes, British folk art, and 20th-century textiles
Coughton Court		Alcester	Stratford-on-Avon	Historic house	Operated by the National Trust, grand Tudor country house reflecting six centuries of ownership
Hall's Croft		Stratford-upon-Avon	Stratford-on-Avon	Historic house	17th-century home of William Shakespeare's eldest daughter Susannah, and her husband Dr John Hall, features period rooms, furnishings, paintings, period doctor's consulting room with artefacts
Harvard House and the Museum of British Pewter		Stratford-upon-Avon	Stratford-on-Avon	Art	Elizabethan town house with exhibits of pewter dating back to the Roman era
Henley-in-Arden Heritage Centre		Henley-in-Arden	Stratford-on-Avon	Local	local history, social, business and domestic life
Kenilworth Abbey Barn Museum		Kenilworth	Warwick	Local	History of St Mary's Abbey, Kenilworth and local history, operated by the Kenilworth History and Archaeology Society
Kenilworth Castle & Elizabethan Garden		Kenilworth	Warwick	Historic house	Operated by English Heritage, ruins of a large medieval fortress, Elizabethan gatehouse with exhibits about Robert Dudley and Queen Elizabeth I, recreated Elizabethan garden
Lunt Roman Fort		Baginton	Warwick	Archaeology	Remains and artifacts of a Roman fort
Market Hall, Warwick		Warwick	Warwick	Multiple	Archaeology, geology, natural history, exhibits of art, history and culture
Mary Arden's Farm / Palmer's Farm		Wilmcote	Stratford-on-Avon	Historic house	16th-century period working Tudor farm and farmhouse, childhood home of William Shakespeare's mother, Mary Arden
Midland Air Museum		Baginton	Warwick	Aviation	Historic military and civilian aircraft, Sir Frank Whittle Jet Heritage Centre with jet engines, area aviation history
Nash's House		Stratford-upon-Avon	Stratford-on-Avon	Historic house	Local history up to William Shakespeare's time, located in the house next door to the ruins and gardens of Shakespeare's final residence, New Place
Nuneaton Museum & Art Gallery		Nuneaton	Nuneaton and Bedworth	Multiple	Reconstruction of George Eliot's London drawing room of 1870 and personal items, social history, industry, art exhibits
Packwood House		Lapworth	Warwick	Historic house	Operated by the National Trust, timber-framed Tudor manor house with tapestries and fine furniture, topiary yew garden
Queen's Own Hussars Museum		Warwick	Warwick	Military	Regimental uniforms, history and memorabilia
Ragley Hall		Alcester	Stratford-on-Avon	Historic house	18th-century great house with fine paintings, ceramics and antique furniture, gardens, 400 acre (1.6 km2) grounds
Roman Alcester		Alcester	Stratford-on-Avon	Archaeology	area Roman artefacts, interpretations of life in Roman Britain
Royal Regiment of Fusiliers Museum (Royal Warwickshire)		Warwick	Warwick	Military	Memorabilia and history of the Royal Warwickshire Fusiliers to today's Royal Regiment of Fusiliers
Rugby Art Gallery and Museum		Rugby	Rugby	Multiple	Local history, art, Roman artefacts, social and industrial history, home to the World Rugby Hall of Fame
Rugby School Museum		Rugby	Rugby	Education	history and memorabilia of the Rugby School
Shakespeare's Birthplace		Stratford-upon-Avon	Stratford-on-Avon	Historic house	Restored 16th-century half-timbered house believed to be the childhood home of William Shakespeare
Shakespeare's Schoolroom and Guildhall		Stratford-upon-Avon	Stratford-on-Avon	Historic guild building	restored 13th-century guild building where, in the 1570s, William Shakespeare would have received the grammar school education observable in his plays
St John's House		Warwick	Warwick	History	Town's social history, including costume and textiles, dolls and toys, domestic and working life artifacts, Victorian schoolroom and kitchen
Stoneleigh Abbey		Stoneleigh	Warwick	Historic house	16th-century large country mansion
Stratford Armouries		Pathlow	Stratford-on-Avon	Military	Arms and armour from around the world
Tudor World		Stratford-upon-Avon	Stratford-on-Avon	History	16th-century period building with ties to William Shakespeare, demonstrations of Tudor life
Upton House		Upton	Stratford-on-Avon	Historic house	Operated by the National Trust, late 17th-century country house with 1930s interior, important art and porcelain collections, 1930s period garden
Warwick Castle		Warwick	Warwick	Historic house	Medieval castle built by William the Conqueror, castle tours, artillery fort, recreated siege weaponry, separate dungeon themed experience
Webb Ellis Rugby Football Museum		Rugby	Rugby	Sports	Also known as "The Rugby Museum", history and artefacts of rugby football
Wellesbourne Wartime Museum		Wellesbourne	Stratford-on-Avon	Aviation	History of aviation at RAF Wellesbourne Mountford, now Wellesbourne Mountford Airfield
Witchcraft and Wizardology Museum		Stratford-upon-Avon	Stratford-on-Avon	Historic house	16th-century Elizabethan inn with collection of about the history of witchcraft from pre-Christian times to the present day. Including the Bombay Manor Museum

== Defunct museums ==
- George Eliot Hospital Museum, Nuneaton

== See also ==
- Category:Tourist attractions in Warwickshire
