= Winchester's Military Museums =

Winchester's Military Museums are a group of six independent and related regimental museums in Peninsula Barracks and Lower Barracks in Winchester, Hampshire.

The museums are:

- HorsePower: The Museum of the King's Royal Hussars
- Royal Hampshire Regiment Museum in Serle's House
- Royal Green Jackets (Rifles) Museum
- The Gurkha Museum
- Museum of the Adjutant General's Corps also known as The Adjutant General's Corps (AGC) Museum
- The Rifles Museum
