= Robert Grant (VC) =

Recipient of the Victoria Cross

Robert Grant VC
- Born: 1837; Harrogate, Yorkshire
- Died: 1867 (aged 29–30); Islington, London
- Burial place: Highgate Cemetery
- Military career
- Allegiance: United Kingdom
- Branch: British Army
- Rank: Sergeant
- Unit: 5th Regiment of Foot
- Conflicts: Indian Mutiny
- Awards: Victoria Cross
- Other work: Metropolitan Police officer

Robert Grant VC (1837 – 1867) was an English recipient of the Victoria Cross, the highest and most prestigious award for gallantry in the face of the enemy that can be awarded to British and Commonwealth forces.

== Military service ==
Grant was approximately 20 years old, and a corporal (subsequently promoted to sergeant) in the 1st Battalion, 5th Regiment of Foot (later The Northumberland Fusiliers), British Army during the Indian Mutiny when the following deed took place at Alumbagh for which he was awarded the VC. The citation was published in The London Gazette of 19 June 1860, and initially Grant was incorrectly named as Ewart, which was corrected in a subsequent Gazette of 12 October 1860. The citation read:

War-Office, 19th June, 1860.

THE Queen has been graciously pleased to signify Her intention to confer the Decoration of the Victoria Cross on the under-mentioned Soldiers of Her Majesty's Army, whose claims to the same have been submitted for Her Majesty's approval, on account of Acts of Bravery performed by them in India, as recorded against their several names; viz.:

[...]

1st Battalion, 5th Regiment. Serjeant Robert [Grant]. Date of Act of Bravery, 24th September, 1857

For conspicuous devotion at Alumbagh, on the 24th September, 1857, in proceeding under a heavy and galling fire to save the life of Private E. Deveney, whose leg had been shot away, and eventually carrying him safe into camp, with the assistance of the late Lieutenant Brown, and some comrades.

== Police service ==
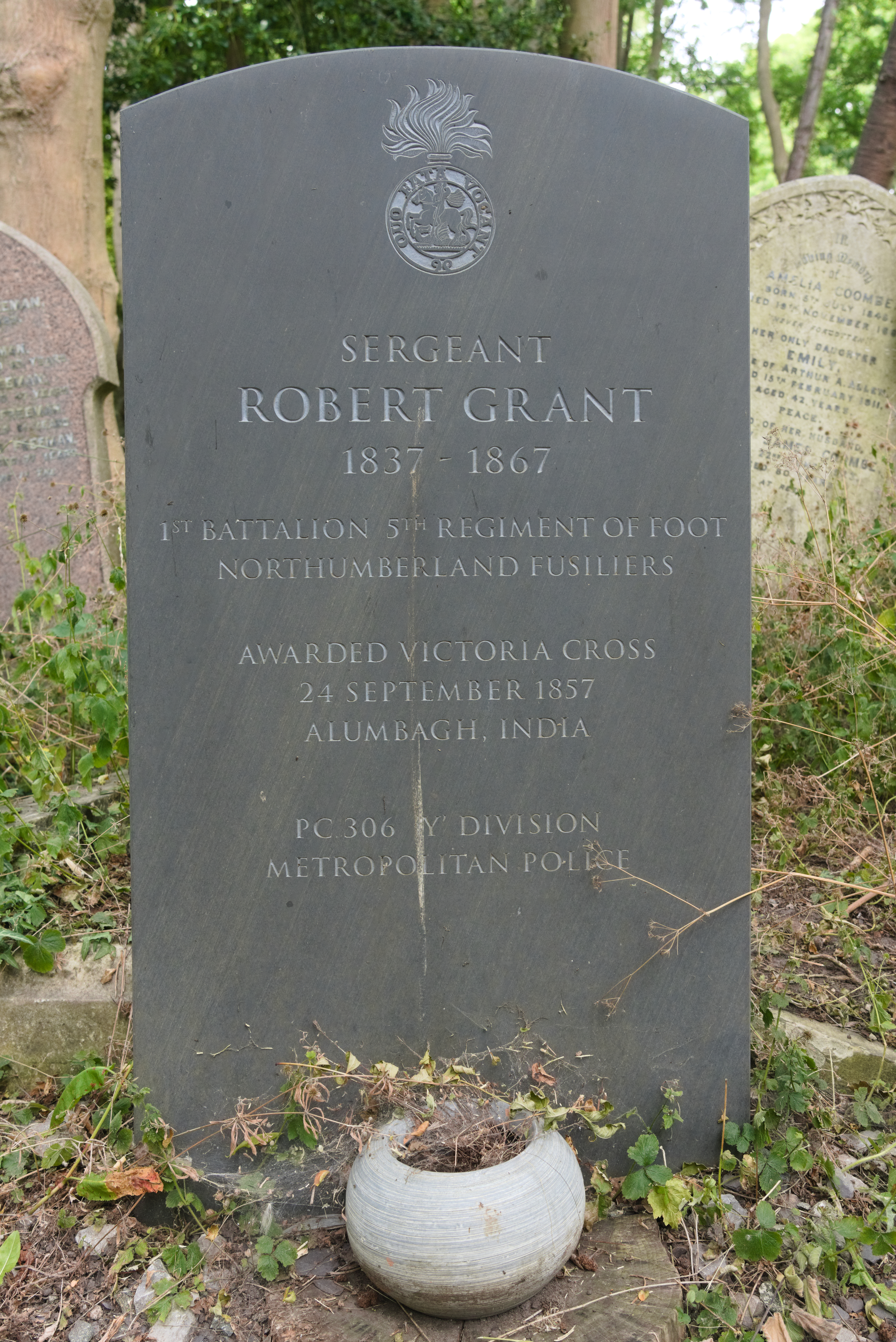
The grave of Sgt Robert Grant, Highgate Cemetery

He later became a constable in the Metropolitan Police, and served in the Y Division Holloway area until his death of what was then commonly known as consumption in 1867. He was buried, in a common grave, number 15054, in Highgate Cemetery, North London. The grave (with modern headstone) lies on the eastern mid-way path just off the main western path.

A replica of his Victoria Cross is displayed at the Fusiliers Museum of Northumberland in Alnwick Castle in Northumberland.

In 2007 and 2008 moves were made to properly commemorate both his military and police service with a memorial stone to be unveiled by the head of London's police service, Sir Ian Blair. He is also commemorated in his home town of Harrogate with a plaque at the War Memorial.
