= Royal Army Service Corps =

Former corps of the British Army (1888–1965)

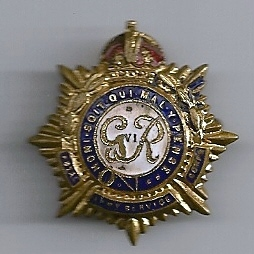
- George VI Royal Army Service Corps badge. Motto: Honi soit qui mal y pense
- Active: 1888–1965
- Allegiance: United Kingdom
- Branch: British Army
- Role: Military administration
- Garrison/HQ: Buller Barracks, Aldershot
- Nickname: The Moke Train or the Commos
- Motto: In Arduis Fidelis (Honi soit qui mal y pense)
- March: Wait for the Wagon

The Royal Army Service Corps (RASC) was a corps of the British Army responsible for land, coastal and lake transport, air despatch, barracks administration, the Army Fire Service, staffing headquarters' units, supply of food, water, fuel and domestic materials such as clothing, furniture and stationery and the supply of technical and military equipment. In 1965 its functions were divided between other Corps (RCT and RAOC) and the RASC ceased to exist; subsequently, in 1993, they in their turn (with some functions of the Royal Engineers) became the "Forming Corps" of the Royal Logistic Corps.

== History ==
For centuries, army transport was operated by contracted civilians. The first uniformed transport corps in the British Army was the Royal Waggoners formed in 1794. It was not a success and was disbanded the following year. In 1799, the Royal Waggon Corps was formed; by August 1802, it had been renamed the Royal Waggon Train. This was reduced to only two troops in 1818 and finally disbanded in 1833.

=== Commissariat and Military Train ===
A transport corps was not formed again until the Crimean War. In 1855, the Land Transport Corps was formed. This was renamed the Military Train the following year. The corps was initially based at Horfield Barracks in Bristol, but in 1859 the 'Brigade Office' and Depot moved to Woolwich. At this time, supply duties were the responsibility of the Commissariat (a uniformed civilian body, principally responsible for food, forage and fuel); while provision of arms, ammunition and other critical stores was the responsibility of the Military Store Department (formed following the abolition of the Board of Ordnance in 1855).

=== Control Department ===
In 1869, there was a major reorganisation of army supply and transport capabilities: the commissaries of the Commissariat and the officers of the Military Train were amalgamated together with the officers of the Military Store Department to form what was called the Control Department under a Controller-in-Chief. The following year, other ranks of the Military Train were combined with those of the Commissariat Staff Corps and the Military Store Staff Corps to form a body of soldiers, officered by the Control Department, which was named the Army Service Corps (ASC). By 1871, the new corps numbered twelve transport companies, seven supply companies and three ordnance store companies, each of around 105 non-commissioned officers and men.

From 1870, the Control Department was placed within the new Department of the Surveyor-General of the Ordnance, who took over as Controller-in-Chief. The Department of the Surveyor General of the Ordnance retained the Control Department and further restructured it into four new divisions superintended by a director: the first was the Supply and Transport Division (formed from the merging of the former commissariat, purveyors and barrack departments), the second was an Artillery and Stores Division (that absorbed the former contracts, clothing, ordnance and stores departments) and the third was a Contracts Division. The fourth division created was called the Control Establishments Subdivision that became responsible for the administration of the Control Department's staff.

=== Commissariat and Transport Department ===
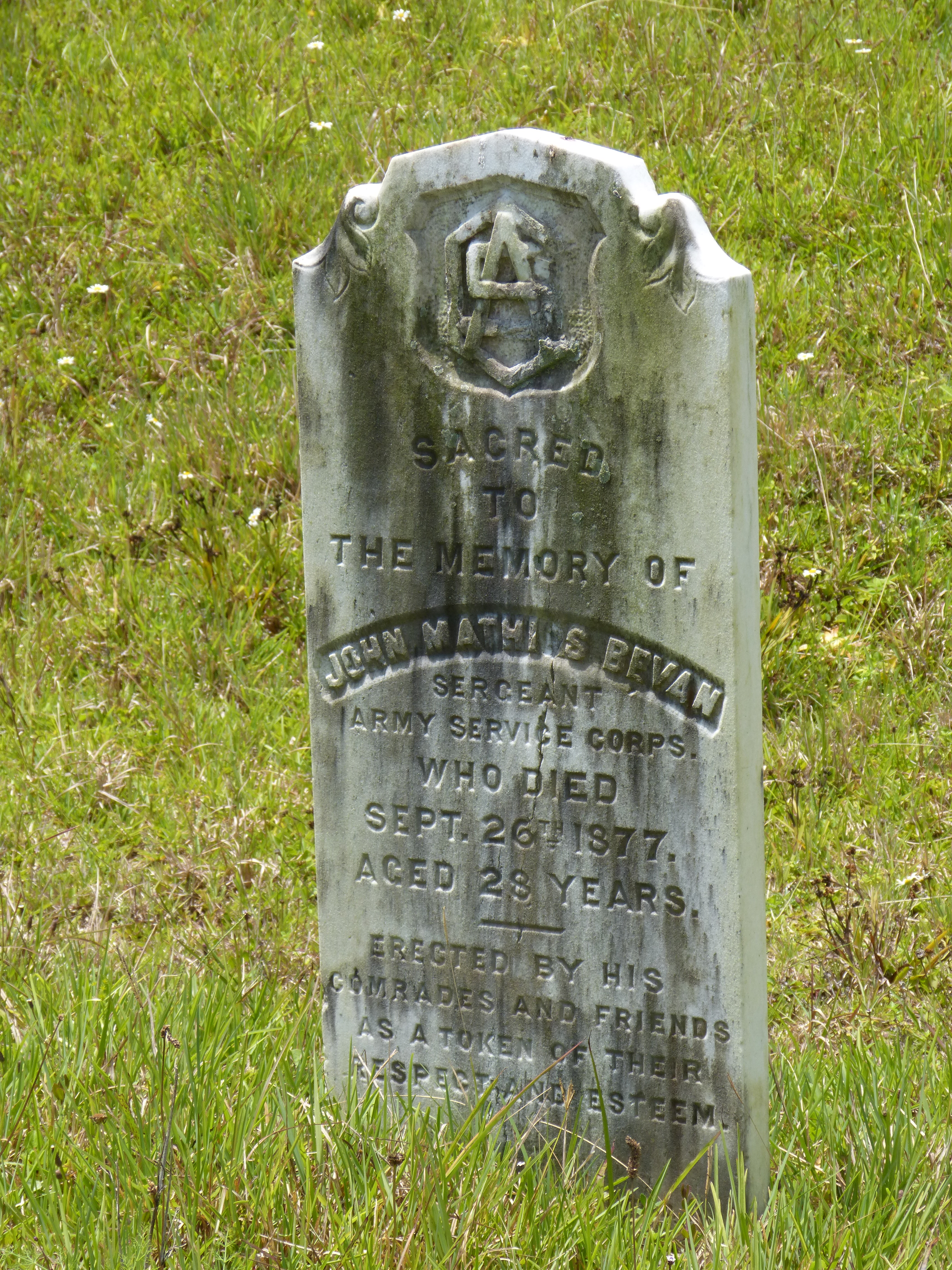
1877 gravestone of Sergeant John Matthias Bevan, ASC, in the new cemetery of St. George's Garrison (part of the Bermuda Garrison), in the Imperial fortress colony of Bermuda

In November 1875, the Control Department was abolished and its work in regard to field service was allocated to two new departments: the Commissariat and Transport Department and the Ordnance Store Department. Following failures in the Anglo-Zulu War, the Commissariat and Transport Department was disbanded in January 1880, and replaced with the Commissariat and Transport Staff. Although the officers of the former Control Department had been split between the two new departments in 1875, no parallel action was taken with regard to other ranks at that time; the Army Service Corps continued to serve both departments until 1881, whereupon it too was split along similar lines to form two distinct units: and the Ordnance Store Corps (which, together with the Ordnance Store Department, would go on to form the Royal Army Ordnance Corps) and the Commissariat and Transport Corps. The latter retained the Supply Companies (which had their depot at Aldershot) and the Transport Companies (whose depot was at Woolwich).

Initially, the Commissariat and Transport Department remained part of the Department of Surveyor General of the Ordnance (in 1878 the Control Establishments Subdivision's name was altered to the Commissariat and Transport Establishments Division under the supervision of a Commissary General). In 1887, however, the Department of the Surveyor General of the Ordnance and its head was abolished; its former functions were then distributed among the several divisions of the Military and Civil Departments: the work of the Supply and Transport Division was allocated to the Quartermaster General's Division.

=== Army Service Corps, 1888–1918 ===
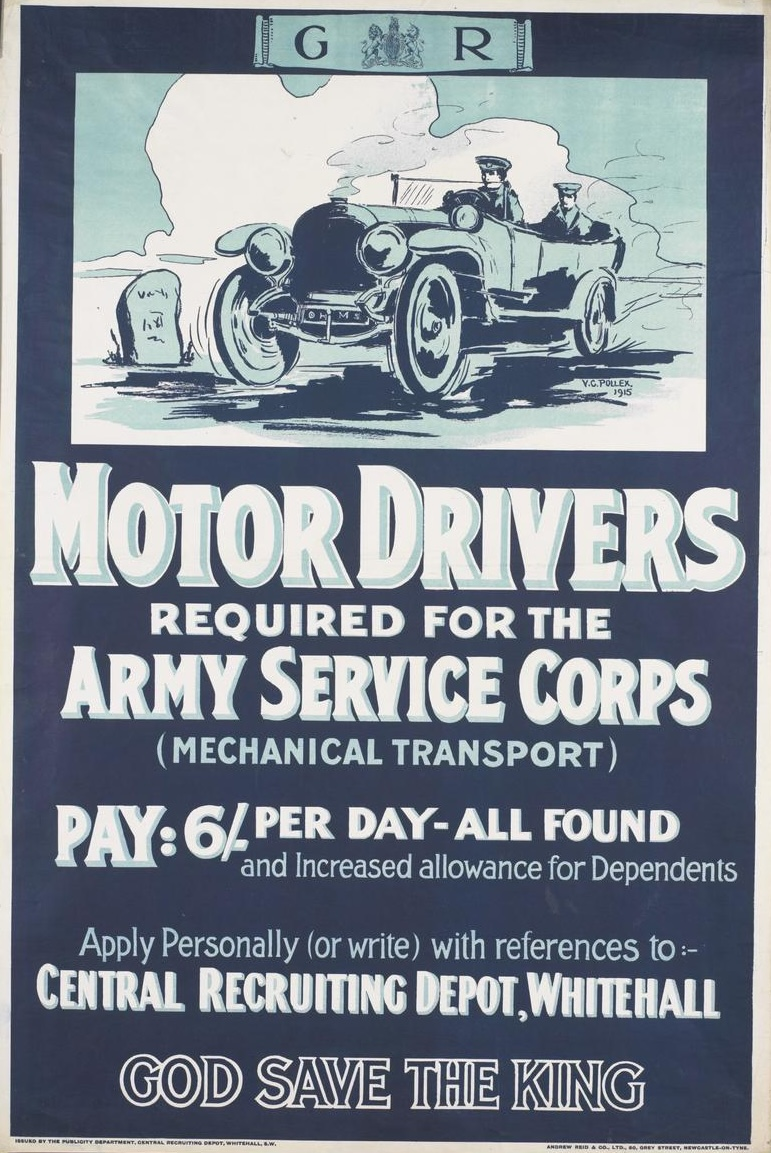
1915 recruiting poster

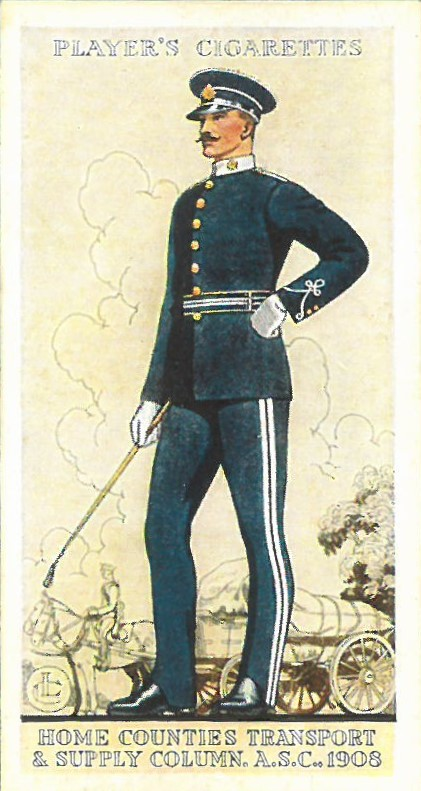
Player's cigarette card showing a driver of the Home Counties Transport & Supply Column of the Army Service Corps in full dress uniform.

In December 1888, the Commissariat and Transport Staff and the Commissariat and Transport Corps amalgamated to form a new Army Service Corps, and for the first time officers and other ranks served in a single unified organisation. The War Department Fleet was transferred to the Corps in 1891, and the ASC also absorbed some transport elements of the Royal Engineers. Furthermore, the Corps of Military Staff Clerks was amalgamated into the Supply branch of the ASC in 1893. After it was opened in 1895, Buller Barracks in Aldershot came to be regarded as the corps headquarters.

=== Royal Army Service Corps, 1918–1965 ===
On 27 November 1918, the corps received the "Royal" prefix for its service in the First World War and became the Royal Army Service Corps. It was divided into Transport and Supply Branches.

Before the Second World War, RASC recruits were required to be at least 5 feet 2 inches (157 cm) tall and could enlist up to 30 years of age (or 35 for tradesmen in the Transport Branch). They initially enlisted for six years with the colours and a further six years with the reserve (seven years and five years for tradesmen and clerks, three years and nine years for butchers, bakers and supply issuers). They trained at Aldershot.

Alone among the "Services" (i.e. rear echelon support corps), RASC personnel were considered to be combatant personnel.

In 1965, the RASC was merged with the Transportation and Movement Control Service of the Royal Engineers (which was responsible for railway transport, inland water transport, port operations, and movements) to form the Royal Corps of Transport. All its supply functions (including the supply of vehicles, their care and preservation in storage and delivery), along with the staff clerks, were transferred to the Royal Army Ordnance Corps, leaving the new RCT solely responsible for transport and movements. In 1993, the RCT and RAOC were merged to form the Royal Logistic Corps, the modern descendant of the ASC.

== Ranks ==
Officers of the Control Department, Commissariat and Transport Department, and Commissariat and Transport Staff held different ranks from the rest of the Army. From February 1885 they were given honorary military ranks, which they held in conjunction with their commissary ranks. Officers of the ASC and RASC held full military rank.

Army rank	Control Department rank	Commissariat & Transport Department rank	Commissariat & Transport Staff rank
Second Lieutenant	Sub-Assistant Commissary	Sub-Assistant Commissary	Quartermaster
Lieutenant	Assistant Commissary	Assistant Commissary	Deputy Assistant Commissary-General
Captain	Deputy Commissary	Deputy Commissary	Deputy Assistant Commissary-General
Major	Commissary	Commissary	Assistant Commissary-General
Lieutenant-Colonel	Assistant Controller	Assistant Commissary-General	Assistant Commissary-General
Colonel	Deputy Controller	Deputy Commissary-General	Deputy Commissary-General
Colonel	Controller	Commissary-General	Commissary-General

== Notable personnel ==
- Category:Royal Army Service Corps soldiers
- Category:Royal Army Service Corps officers

== See also ==
- 15 Air Assault Close Support Squadron RLC
- Cathedral of St Michael and St George, Aldershot (annual service, East Window, and photo of memorial chapel)

== Bibliography ==
- Massé, Lt-Col. C. H. (1948). The Predecessors of the Royal Army Service Corps 1757–1888. Aldershot: Gale & Polden. OCLC 5045026.
- Roper, Dr Michael (1998). The records of the War Office and related departments, 1660–1964. London: Public Record Office. ISBN 9781873162453.
- Sutton, Brigadier John (1998). Wait for the Waggon: the Story of the Royal Corps of Transport and its Predecessors 1794–1993. Barnsley, S. Yorks.: Leo Cooper. ISBN 978-1-47-382038-8.
- Young, Michael (2012) [2000]. Army Service Corps 1902-1918. Nottingham: Partizan Press. ISBN 978-1-85-818638-2.
