= Market Hall Museum, Warwick =

Museum in Warwick, UK

Market Hall Museum
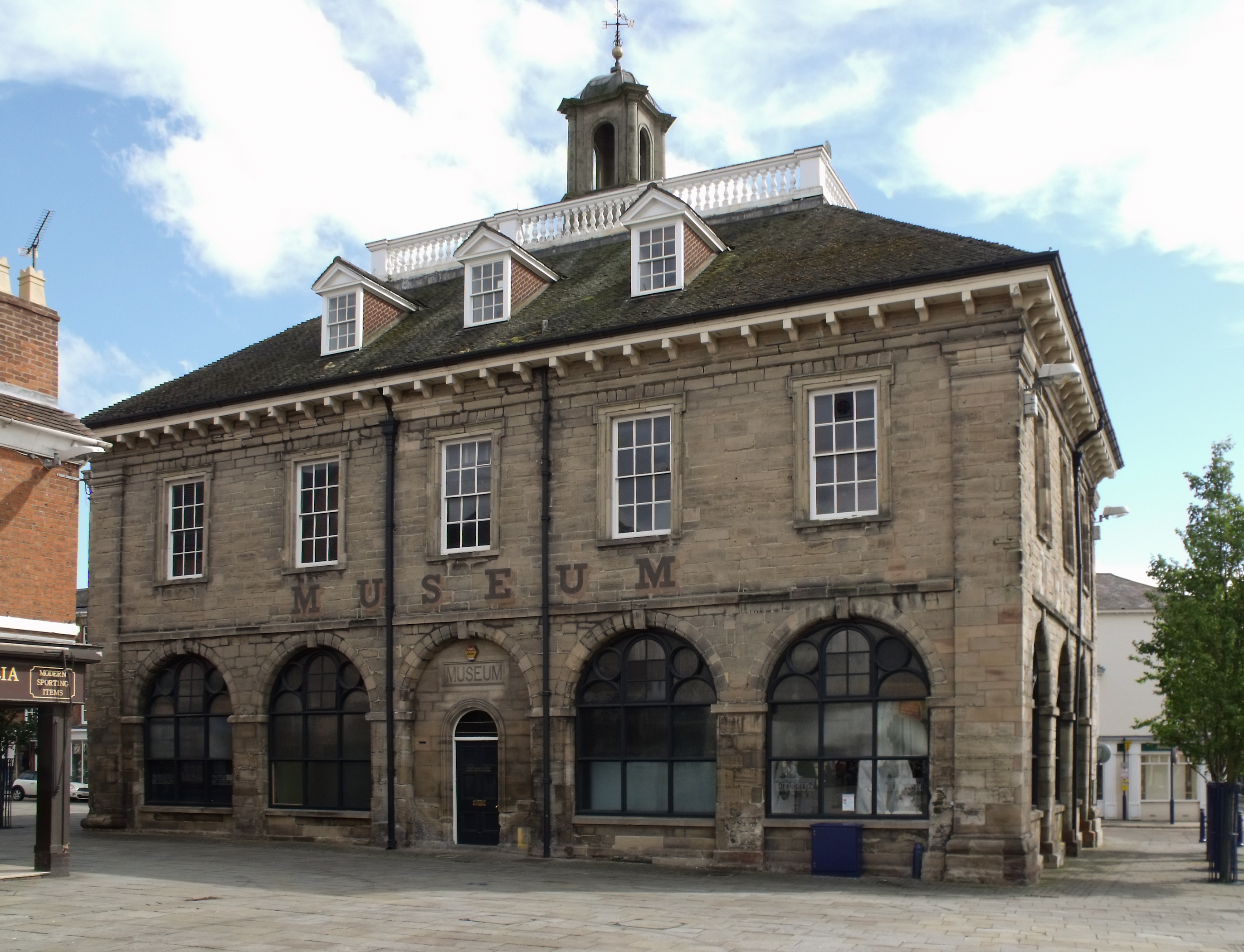
- Established: 1836; 190 years ago
- Location: Warwick, England
- Coordinates: 52.28174°N 1.59065°W
- Website: heritage.warwickshire.gov.uk/market-hall-museum

Market Hall Museum is a historic museum located in Warwick, Warwickshire, England. The Market Hall forms part of The Warwickshire Museum, which is operated by Heritage and Culture Warwickshire. The collections on display at Market Hall are primarily focused on objects in the fields of archaeology, geology and natural history, and particularly those local to Warwickshire.

== History ==
=== Construction ===
The Market Hall was constructed in the latter part of the 17th century, as a way to provide shelter and protection from the weather for salesmen and stallholders in the town's regular market – the precursor, Booth Hall, being declared insufficient. The building was constructed with a large, open-plan ground floor with wide open arches, to allow easy access to the stalls. The first floor also housed a number of rooms, which, after 1694, were rented out as meeting rooms.

From the early 18th century to 1848, one small room in the Hall served as a "lock-up" – a small room which was used to hold prisoners before magistrate trials. From 1833 until its closure in 1848, the room was declared a "disgrace" – in 1842, it was reported that the room was "8ft 8ins by 3ft 8ins" and at one point housed thirteen people.

=== Warwickshire Natural History and Archaeological Society ===
At the beginning of the 19th century, there was a surge in interest in popular education, particularly in the realms of natural sciences, natural history, and archaeology. In 1836, the Warwickshire Natural History and Archaeological Society was formed as a group of like-minded local men. Advertisements were placed in the local newspaper, and rooms were hired in the Market Hall for their meetings. At the first meeting, it was declared that one of the main aims should be to amass a collection of zoological, botanical and mineral objects. These objects were placed on display in the Market Hall for public viewing, on payment of one shilling (an amount which excluded many of the poor of Warwickshire), or an annual one guinea subscription, which also constituted membership of the society. Members additionally had the benefit of being invited to free lectures on natural history or historical topics, and partaking in lunches at the Woolpack Inn across the road.

The Society held a free event in 1847 (and repeated in subsequent years), when members of the public were allowed to view the collections without charge. The Warwick Advertiser noted afterwards that "Hundreds of visitors to the museum conducted themselves with the utmost decorum." In 1879, the ground-floor arches were filled with windows and doors within iron frames. Nevertheless, the ground floor was still used for market activities until around 1900, by which time the museum's collection had grown to such an extent that it required the entire building. In 1905, renovations were undertaken to make the building more suited for use as a museum – these included a new front door with the word MUSEUM on the stonework above it (which can still be seen today). However, membership of the Society began to decline in the latter part of the 19th century.

=== Public service ===
As membership dwindled, funding became more difficult. As a result, in March 1932, the Society gave the museum collection to Warwickshire County Council, making Warwickshire the first county council in the UK to be directly responsible for a museum service. In 1936 the building was scheduled as an Ancient Monument to prevent its demolition, and in 1938 work began to repair and restore it. In the same year, admission to the museum was made free to the general public.

After a period as a Civil Defence store during the Second World War, the Museum building was listed Grade II* in 1953. Further work soon afterwards included the installation of a replica of the original cupola, and new windows to light the attic floor (currently used as offices). Since then, the museum has been run by the Warwickshire Museum Service, now part of Heritage and Culture Warwickshire.

== Museum ==
As at its inception, the museum still holds items of significant archaeological, geological or natural interest. However, whilst the museum originally collected objects from around the country (with a bias toward local findings), the museum now displays almost exclusively objects local to Warwickshire.

Examples include:

- The Warwickshire Bear – on the ground floor, by the entrance, is a full-sized, real stuffed bear. The pose the Bear takes — rearing on its hind legs, against a large wooden trunk — is intended to replicate that of the Bear and Ragged Staff, a heraldic sign which has been associated with Earls of Warwick since at least the 14th century. This symbol can be found today on the shield of Warwickshire County Council, as well as the shield of the University of Warwick and the badge of Warwickshire County Cricket Club.
- Oisin the Deer – Amongst the geological collections is the complete skeleton of a Giant Irish Deer, donated to the museum during the 19th century. Such animals had, antler spans of up to four meters wide and stood two meters tall. The deer in question has in recent years been a focal point of the museum, to the extent that Heritage and Culture Warwickshire's official Twitter account is named after him.
- The Spicer Family – The Warwick and Leamington-based Spicer family were some of the best-renowned British taxidermists of the late 19th and early 20th centuries, over three generations. Specimens produced by this family were unique in their production quality, including painted backgrounds and realistic bases often created with real (dried) vegetation. The Warwickshire Museum houses a tribute to the Spicer family as well as a number of genuine cased, and recased, specimens. The collection on display has since been downsized.
- The Sheldon Tapestry – The Sheldon Tapestry Map of Warwickshire was commissioned in the 1580s by Ralph Sheldon, to decorate his home in South Warwickshire. Many tapestries were commissioned, but only four showed maps of counties – those of Worcester, Oxfordshire, Gloucestershire and Warwickshire. As well as standard details such as towns and connecting roads, the maps are unique in additionally showing woodland and hills, as well as sketches of major towns and church towers. It hangs on a wall of the Market Hall Museum, occupying the entire wall. The tapestry was added to the collection of the Warwickshire Museum Service in the 1960s.

The museum, half a mile from Warwick Railway Station and a brief walk from Warwick Central Bus station, is open to the public free of charge.

== See also ==
- St John's House Museum, Warwick
- List of museums in Warwickshire
