= Staff clerk =

A staff clerk is a professional specialist clerk in the British Army who is a member of an administrative corps, as opposed to a unit clerk, who is a member of the corps or regiment in which they work and is trained first and foremost in the duties of that unit (such as an infantryman).

Staff clerks predominantly work in headquarters units alongside staff officers, hence the name. Clerks working in headquarters were consolidated into the Army Service Corps (later Royal Army Service Corps) during the Boer War. In the McLeod Reorganisation of Army Logistics, staff clerks were transferred to the Royal Army Ordnance Corps in 1965.

In 1992, they were again transferred to the Staff and Personnel Support Branch of the Adjutant General's Corps and were merged with unit clerks.
