= Patrick McHale =

Recipient of the Victoria Cross

- Born: 1826; Killala, County Mayo
- Died: 26 October 1866 (aged 39-40); Shorncliffe, Kent
- Burial place: Shorncliffe Military Cemetery, Kent
- Military career
- Allegiance: United Kingdom
- Branch: British Army
- Rank: Private
- Units: 5th Regiment of Foot
- Conflicts: Indian Mutiny
- Awards: Victoria Cross

Patrick McHale VC (Irish: Pádraig Mac Céile; 1826 – 26 October 1866) was born in Killala, County Mayo, and was an Irish recipient of the Victoria Cross, the highest and most prestigious award for gallantry in the face of the enemy that can be awarded to British and Commonwealth forces.

== Details ==
He was approximately 31 years old, and a private in the 1st Battalion, 5th Regiment of Foot (later The Northumberland Fusiliers) British Army, during the Siege of Lucknow and Second Battle of Cawnpore, turning points in the Indian Mutiny, when the following deeds took place for which he was awarded the VC:

1st Battalion, 5th Regiment Private Patrick M'Hale

Date of Acts of Bravery, 2nd October and 22nd December, 1857.

For conspicuous bravery at Lucknow on the 2nd October, 1857, when he was the first man at the capture of one of the guns at the Cawnpore Battery,—and again, on the 22 December 1857, when, by a bold rush, he was the first to take possession of one of the enemy's guns, which had sent several rounds of grape through his company, which was skirmishing up to it.

On every occasion of attack, Private M'Hale has been the first to meet the foe, amongst whom he caused such consternation by the boldness of his rush, as to leave little work for those who followed to his support. By his habitual coolness and daring, and sustained bravery in action, his name has become a household word for gallantry among his comrades.

== Further information ==
He died at Shorncliff, Kent on 26 October 1866 and was buried at Shorncliffe Military Cemetery, near Folkestone, Kent, England. Section I – Upper Right. Headstone.

== The medal ==
His Victoria Cross is displayed in the Fusiliers Museum of Northumberland at Alnwick Castle, Northumberland, England.
