= St John's House Museum, Warwick =

Museum in Warwickshire, England

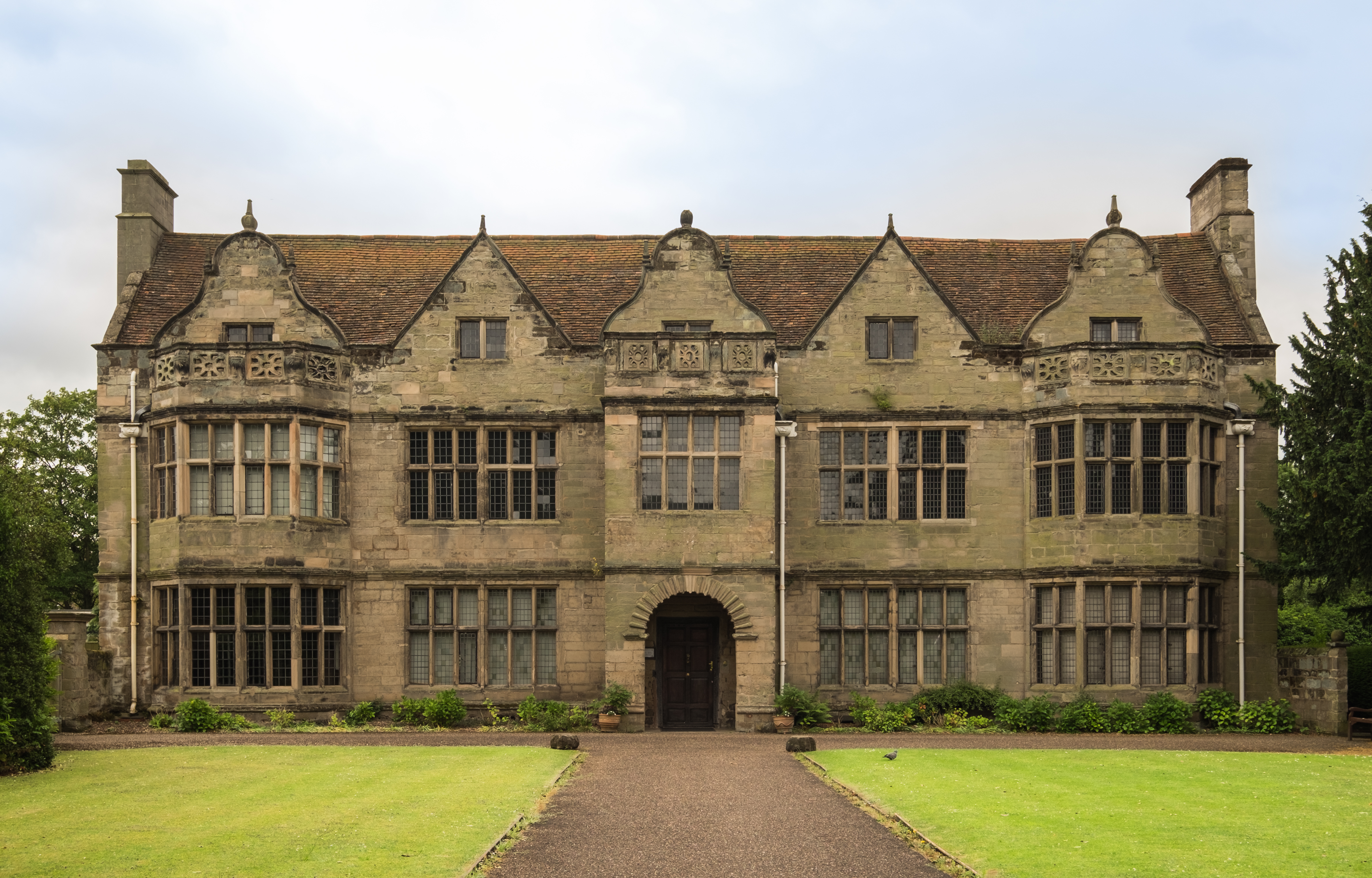
- Established: 1960; 66 years ago
- Location: 4 St Johns, Warwick, Warwickshire, England
- Coordinates: 52.2832°N 1.5804°W
- Website: heritage.warwickshire.gov.uk/museum-service/st-johns-house-museum-planning-your-visit

Listed Building – Grade I
- Official name: St John's House
- Designated: 19 March 1973
- Reference no.: 1299845

Listed Building – Grade II*
- Official name: Entrance gateway to St John's House and flanking boundary walls
- Designated: 19 March 1973
- Reference no.: 1035400

St John's House is an historic house located in Warwick, just east of the town centre, in Warwickshire, England. It is now an Education, Event and Wedding Venue operated by Heritage and Culture Warwickshire, part of Warwickshire County Council . It has a history spanning almost 900 years. To the side of the house is a small garden belonging to St John's and to the rear is the large St. Nicholas' Park. The current grade I listed building dates from around 1666, and is considered one of the most important buildings in Warwick. The building was used in the filming of Annabellum: the curse of Salem in 2019.

== Historic use ==
=== As a hospital ===
In the mid 12th century, during the reign of Henry II, the land on which St. John's House stands was given to the establishment of the Hospital of St. John the Baptist. The hospital was brought into being by William de Beaumont, then Earl of Warwick. This hospital provided two purposes: To help the local poor and ill; and to provide casual overnight boarding and food to impoverished travellers such as pilgrims. The Hospital of St. John the Baptist was one of two such hospitals in the town of Warwick at the time. The other was St Michael's Leper Hospital, founded with the sole purpose of providing help and respite to those in the parish suffering from leprosy. Of both hospitals, only the chapel building of St. Michael still stands.

In 1291's taxatio, the Hospital was noted to own a dovecote worth 2 shillings. Additionally, the carucate of land owned by the Hospital was valued at 10 shilling per year. In 1337, protection was granted to the hospital's brethren and their attorneys for the collection of alms at churches. At this time it was suggested that some building renovation was necessary.

It is known that in 1610 the site comprised four standing buildings, including a gatehouse topped with crenulations. The largest of the three other buildings has crosses at the roof's apex, suggesting its religious use as the site's chapel. At the time the hospital site also included a cemetery - remains have often been dug up during refurbishment or remodeling works on the House. The first recorded case was in the 1830s when work was being undertaken in the kitchen garden. In 1987, two workmen digging to the Coten End front of St. John's Court flats discovered two skulls.

=== As a residence ===
During the Dissolution of the Monasteries at the behest of Henry VIII, St. John's was granted to Anthony Stoughton, for services to the King. The land was later passed to his eldest son William by inheritance. Neither of the two lived in the house, but they leased it out to others such as Richard Townsende, a yeoman at Warwick. Eventually the land was inherited by the son of William Stoughton, Anthony Stoughton (junior), who built a house on the site. Of note is the fact that in the East Wing of the house there is a door lintel which bears the date 1626 and the initials A.S.. The house remained in the possession of the Stoughton family until 1960.

=== As a school ===
In 1791, the building was rented out for the first time by the Earl of Warwick for public use, with the intent of converting it into a school. The school, then known as St John's Academy, was founded by William T Fowler and was set up as a school for "Young Gentlemen" (as advertised on the hand-bill). This was then reverted in 1845 under Benjamin Townsend, the son-in-law of William Fowler. After Townsend's death in 1857, three of his daughters, Susanna, Elizabeth and Sarah, took over the running of the school, with it being a girls' school from at least 1861.

=== As a public service ===
After a brief spell of private tenancy in the start of the 20th century, the house became the property of the War Department, where it was used for the administration of the Home Counties and East Anglian Brigades. In 1959 the Lord Warwick declared the sale of the Warwick Castle Estates, including the St. John's House. The building was then turned into a museum, with some of the premises leased to the Regiment Royal Warwickshire Regiment. The museum was officially opened in 1960 by Bernard Montgomery, 1st Viscount Montgomery of Alamein. In 2016 the Museum ceased to be open to the general public.

== The house ==
Whilst run as a museum the house exhibits provided information about the history of the site, as well as Warwick and the surrounding area. Features of the museum included:

- A full-sized replica of a Victorian classroom, as it would have appeared during the educational period of St. John's House. The display includes benches and seating, charts and diagrams, as well as teaching tools such as abacuses and blackboards, all contemporary of the time. This display is designed to give people (young people in particular) an idea of what education would have been like in 19th century compared with now. The house currently runs activities based on this exhibit for schools.
- The second floor housed a museum dedicated to the history of the Royal Warwickshire Fusiliers. until 2021. This has now moved to Pageant House Warwick
- In 2011, the Museum Service established a themed outdoor space, St John's Brook Gardens, between St John's House and St Nicholas' Park. This covered woodcarving and information on natural history.

The museum is no longer open to the public. It is now the home of Warwickshire Heritage Learning and also hosts special events and is available for venue hire.

== See also ==
- Market Hall Museum, Warwick
- List of museums in Warwickshire
