= The Rifles Museum =

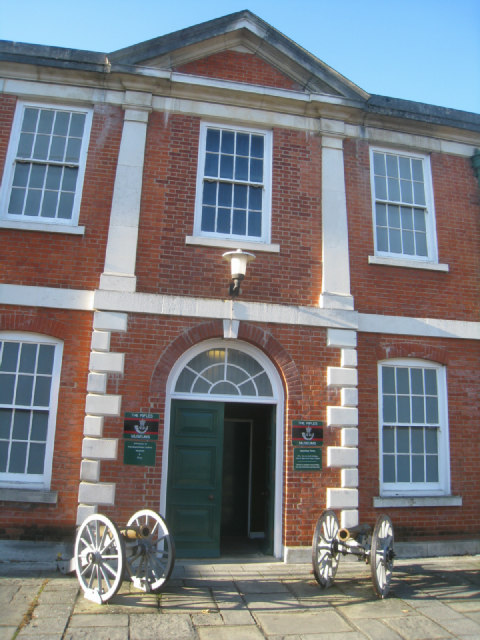
- The Rifles Museum

- Shown in Hampshire
- Established: 2013
- Location: Peninsula Barracks, Winchester, United Kingdom
- Coordinates: 51.0628°N 1.3212°W
- Type: Regimental museum
- Website: riflesmuseum.co.uk

The Rifles Museum is the regimental museum of The Rifles. It is located in Winchester in Hampshire, England and is part of Winchester's Military Museums.

== History ==
The museum was established as "The Rifles Collection" in 2013 with the objective of preserving artifacts of importance in the history of The Rifles since it was formed in 2007. It also organises a programme of regular military talks around the UK. Now known as "The Rifles Museum", the museum is organised chronologically and it has a special display relating to the courage of soldiers, and the Victoria Cross in particular. It forms one of the six military museums at Peninsular Barracks.
