= Market Square, Lancaster =

Historic public square in Lancaster, England

Market Square
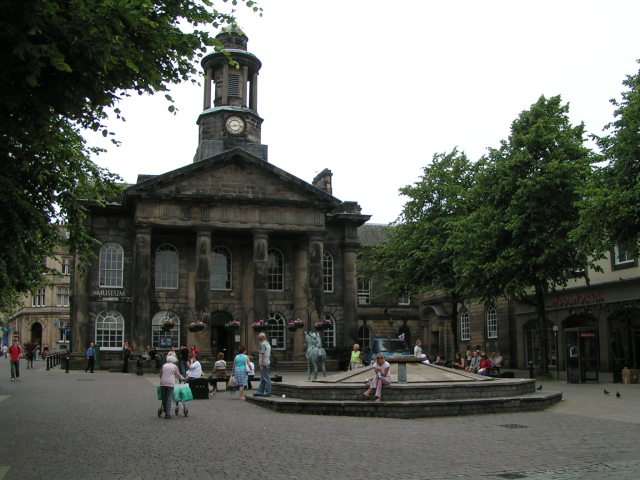
- Looking west across the square to Lancaster City Museum, 2004

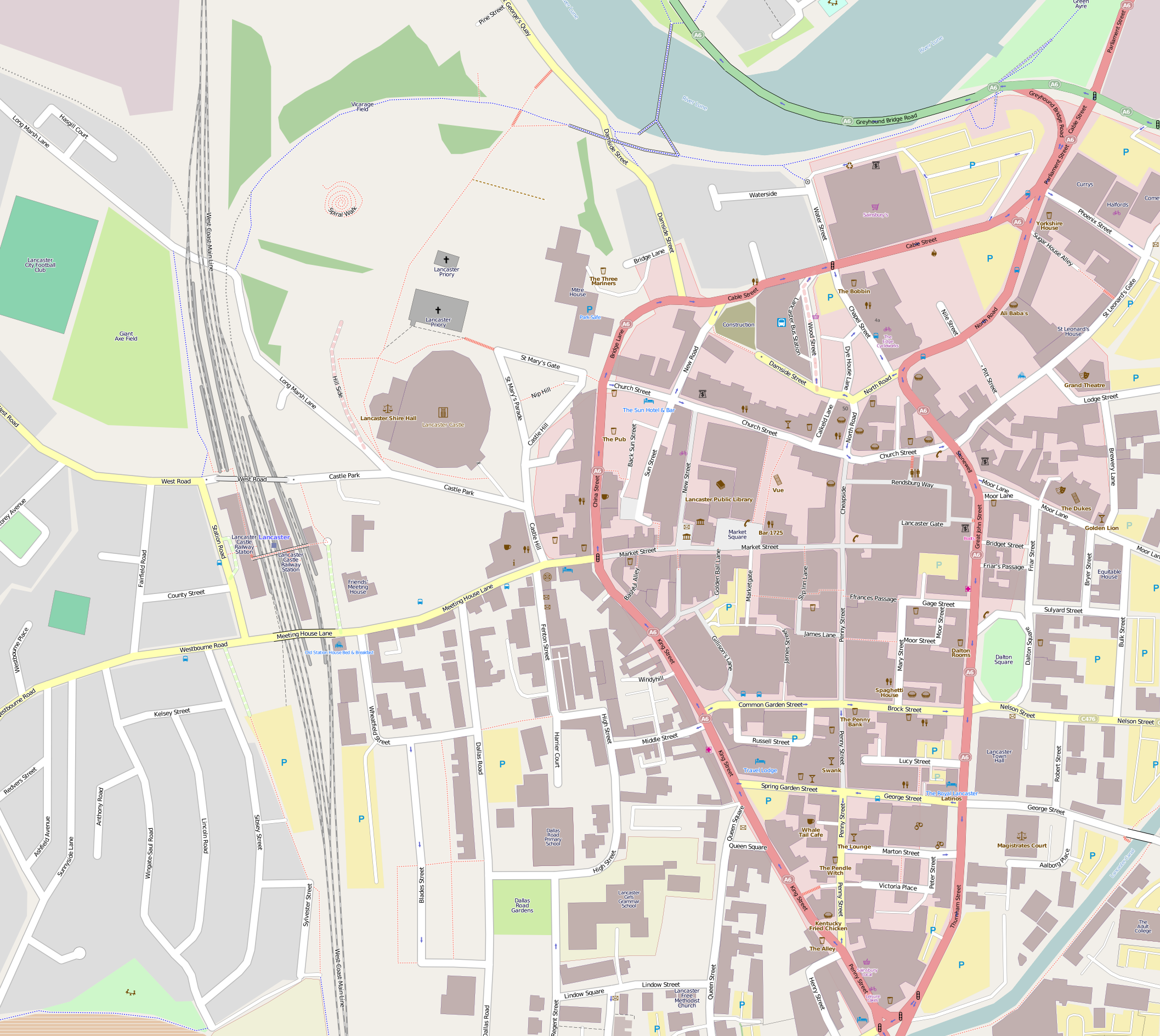
- Location within Lancaster city centre
- Maintained by: City of Lancaster
- Location: Lancaster, Lancashire, England
- Coordinates: 54.04885°N 2.80139°W

Market Square is an historic public square in Lancaster, Lancashire, England. It is located on Market Street, a few hundred feet east of New Street. It is believed the square was founded around 1193, when a borough charter was granted to the town, allowing it to hold a market.

Lancaster City Museum stands on the western side of the square, in the building formerly occupied by Lancaster Town Hall, which moved to Dalton Square in 1910. The museum building was completed in 1783 and is a designated Grade II* listed building. Lancaster Central Library adjoins the museum building in the northwestern corner of the square.

Two arcades (a colloquial name for a alleyway or ginnel) open out on the square from the south. One from St Nicholas Arcades and one that originates on King Street.

Bonnie Prince Charlie was proclaimed regent in the square by the Jacobite Army on 24 November 1745.

== Gallery ==
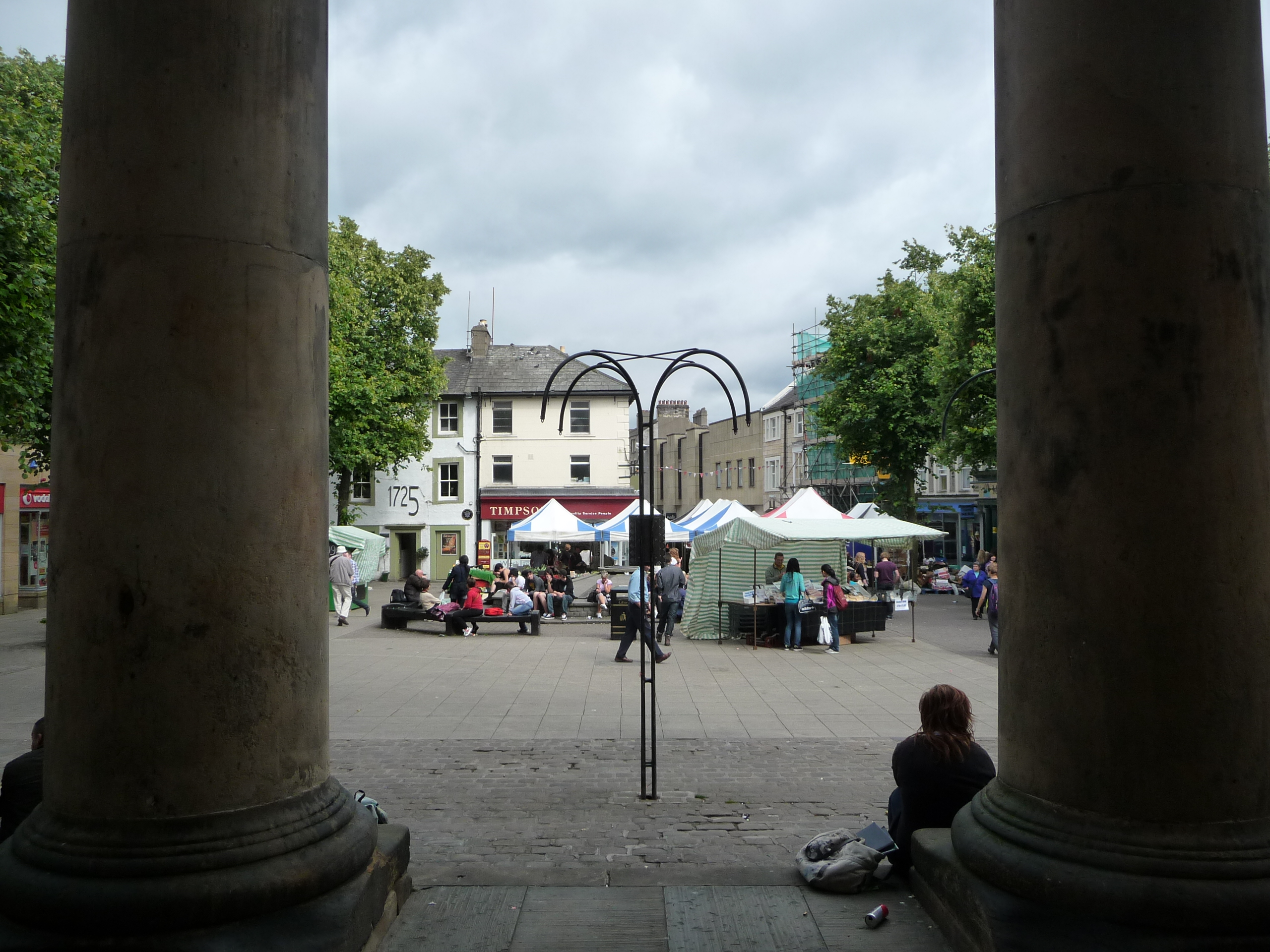
View from the museum entrance, 2011, looking east down Market Street

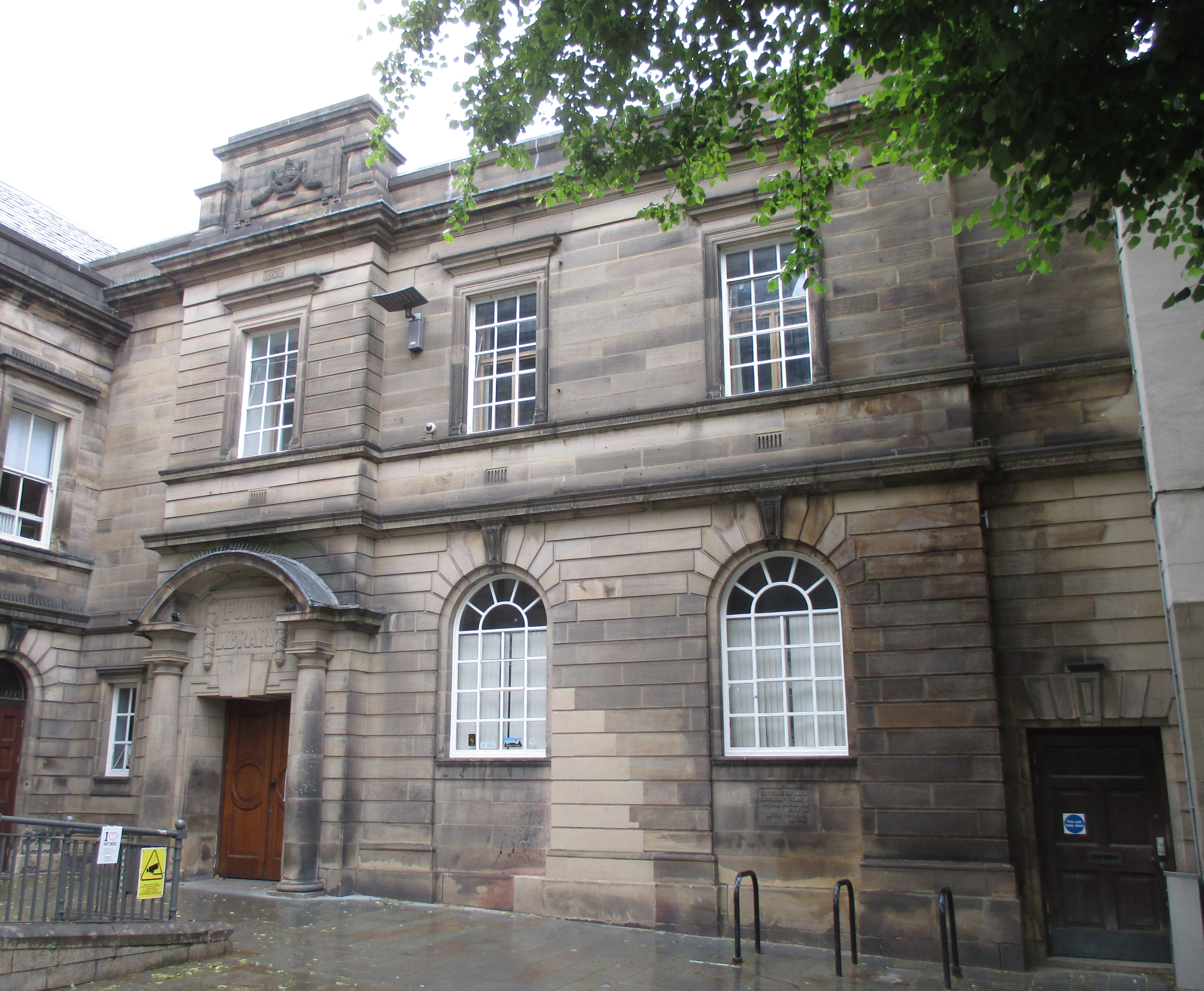
Lancaster Central Library, nestled in the northwestern corner of the square
