= Alambagh =

Neighbourhood in Lucknow, India

Coordinates: 26.808°N 80.898°E

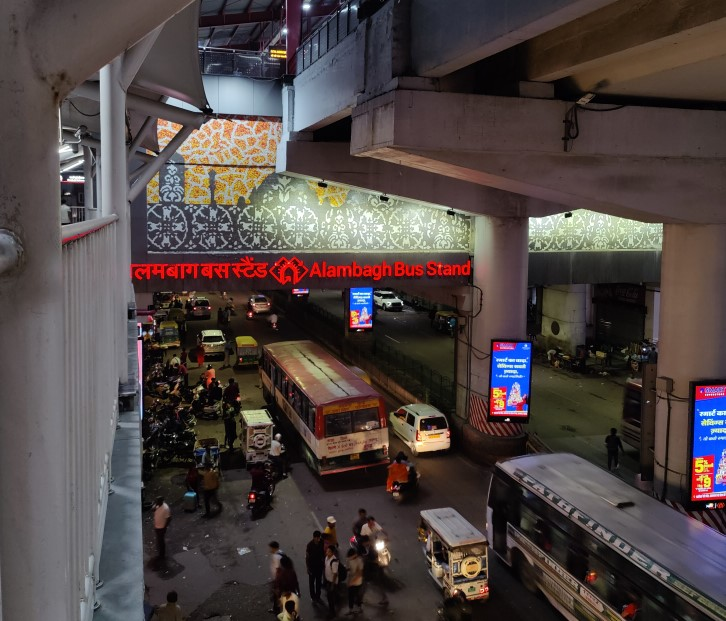
Alambagh ISBT the biggest bus terminal in the city.

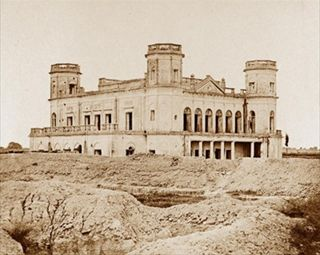
Alam Bagh Palace (19th-century photograph)

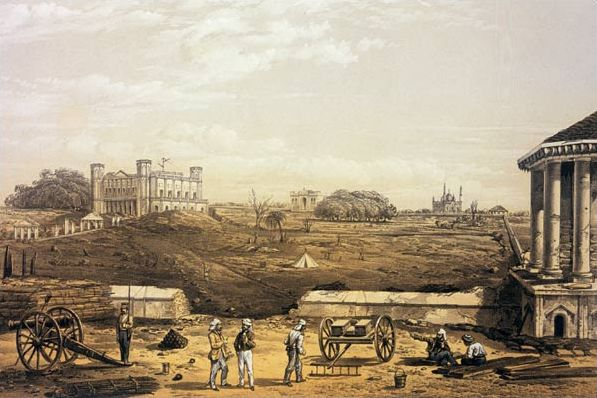
British battery in Alam Bagh gardens, Christmas Day 1857, by Lt. C. Mecham

Alambagh (Hindi: आलमबाग़, pronounced [aːləmˈbaːɣ]) is a settlement located in Lucknow near Kanpur road in India. It is one of the most important residential and commercial areas of Lucknow and also one of the densely populated areas of the city. Alambagh falls in the Lucknow Cantonment constituency.

== History ==
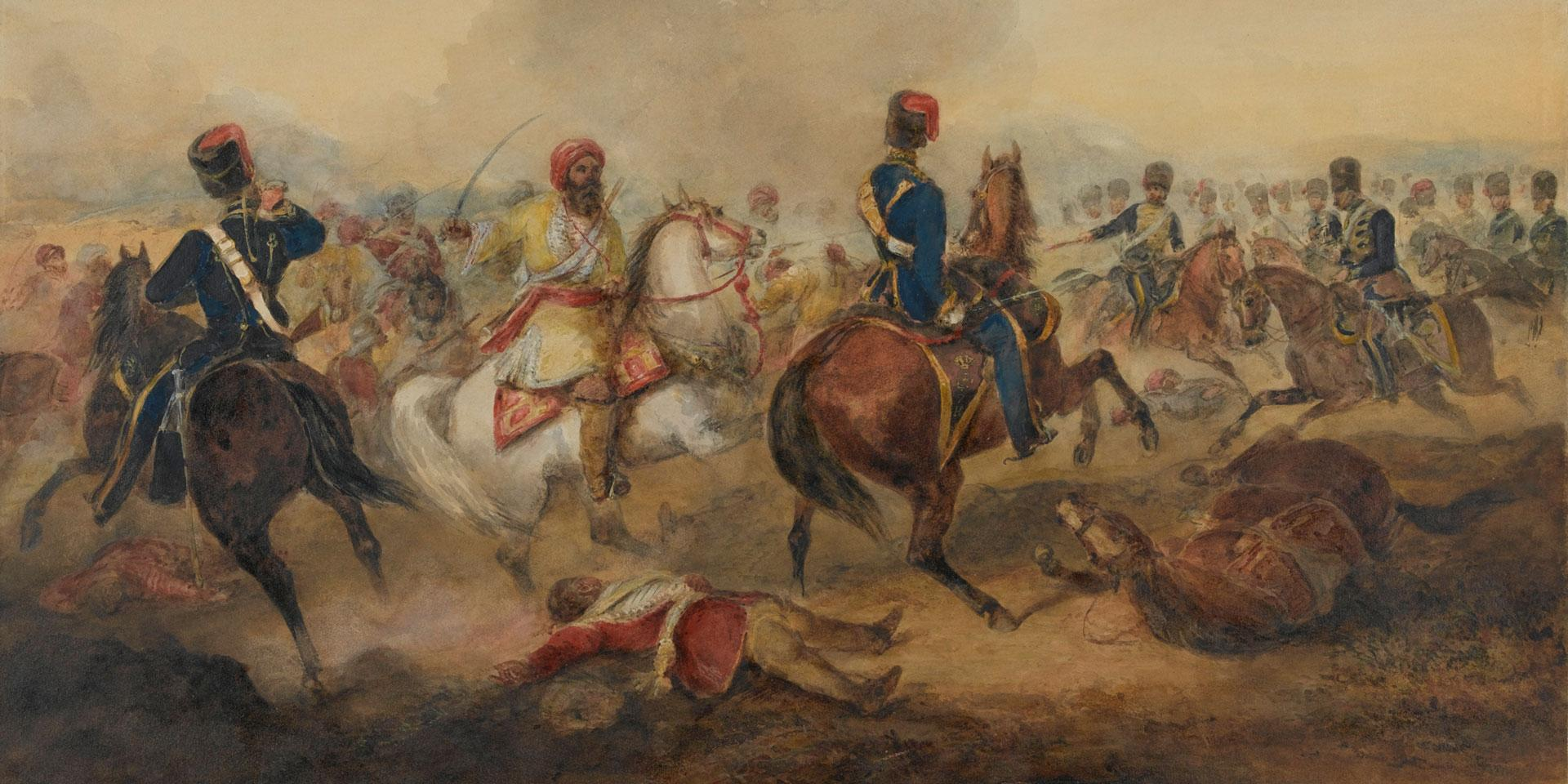
7th Hussars, charging a body of the Mutineer's Cavalry at Alambagh

Earlier Alambagh contained a palace, a mosque and other buildings, as well as a beautiful garden. Alambagh was converted into a fort in November 1857 during the Indian mutiny of 1857. The fort, under the command of General Outram was attacked repeatedly, but unsuccessfully until March 1858 when Sir Colin Campbell returned to attack Lucknow. After the British defeated the mutineers it served as the military command center for Lucknow and the nearby towns.

== Present ==
Alambagh is towards the south end of Lucknow and serves as a common market place for surrounding villages. Farmers from nearby villages visit Alambagh every morning to whole sell vegetables and crops to distributors and local retailers, who in turn distribute the vegetables and crops to retailers throughout Lucknow city.

== Transport ==
Alambagh has the Alambagh bus depot. It is well connected to other parts of the city by Kanpur road in south, Sitapur road in west and roads built by the state government in other two directions. It also now has a metro station connecting to airport as well as railway station known as Charbagh. Autorickshaws and tempos are also a popular means of transport in Alambagh.

== Education ==
Alambagh has some of the most prestigious schools of Lucknow.

- Janata Boys Inter College
- New Public Collegiate Inter College
- Spring Dale School
- City Montessori School
- St. Mary's Convent
- Janata Girl's Inter College
- St. Ann's Day Public School
- Stella Mary's School
- Kendriya Vidyalaya
- S K D Academy
- Lucknow Public School
- Guru Nanak Girls Inter College
- Krishna Devi Girls Inter College
- New Public Inter College
- Avadh Collegiate Day Boarding Inter College
- Lok Bharti Inter College

== See also ==
- Indian Mutiny
- Lucknow
- Robert Grant VC
- Siege of Lucknow
- Sir James Outram
- U P CLDF
