= The Gurkha Museum =

Military museum in Winchester, England

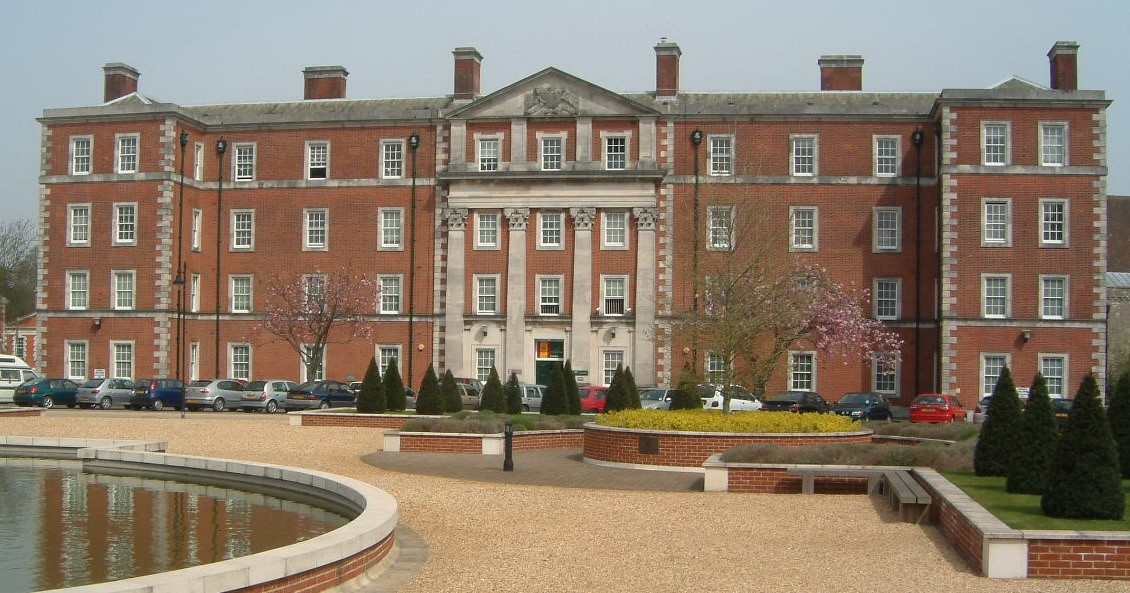
- Peninsula Barracks

- Shown in Hampshire
- Established: 1974
- Location: Peninsula Barracks, Winchester, United Kingdom
- Coordinates: 51.0624°N 1.3203°W
- Type: Military
- Website: www.thegurkhamuseum.co.uk

The Gurkha Museum commemorates the service of Gurkha soldiers to the British Crown, a relationship that has endured since 1815. It is located in Winchester in Hampshire, England and is part of Winchester's Military Museums.

== History ==
The Gurkha Museum was first established at Queen Elizabeth Barracks in Church Crookham, England and officially opened by Field Marshal Lord Harding on 21 June 1974. It was initially housed in a wooden barrack block, which soon proved too small for museum's growing collection. The closure of the Rifle Depot at Peninsula Barracks in Winchester proved an opportunity to move to larger and more permanent premises. The museum in Church Crookham was closed in April 1989, and the transfer of its collection to Winchester began. The relocated museum was officially opened by Field Marshal Lord Bramall on 16 July 1990.

In 1994, a separate Gurkha Museum was established at a temporary site in Kathmandu, the capital of Nepal. It was moved to Pokhara in 2005.

== Collections ==
The museum features tableaux, dioramas, display cases and interactive touchscreen displays, along with visual and audio presentations about Nepal and the Gurkhas' renowned military history, including their 26 Victoria Crosses. The collections tell the story of Gurkha service to the Crown in various wars and military campaigns, as well as the history of the four Gurkha regiments that became part of the British Army in 1948: the Royal Gurkha Rifles, the Queen's Gurkha Engineers, the Queen's Gurkha Signals and the Queen's Own Gurkha Logistic Regiment. The museum also has a library, an archive facility and a research room on its second floor.

== See also ==
- Gurkha
- Brigade of Gurkhas
- The Gurkha Welfare Trust
