= Military Provost Staff =

Custody and detention arm of the British Army

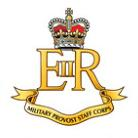
- Former Cap Badge of the Military Provost Staff Corps (Queens Cypher)
- Active: 1901 – Present
- Country: United Kingdom
- Branch: British Army
- Role: The UK's military detention specialists
- Size: 273 personnel
- Part of: Adjutant General's Corps
- Garrison/HQ: Colchester Garrison
- March: New Colonial

Commanders
- Current commander: Lt Col Michael Whitmarsh (RTR)

Insignia
- Tactical Recognition Flash

The Military Provost Staff are the British Army's specialists in custody and detention, providing advice inspection and surety within custodial establishments. The MPS form part of the Adjutant General's Corps and are based at the Military Corrective Training Centre (MCTC) in Colchester, Essex.

== History ==
The Military Prison Staff Corps (MPSC) was formed in 1901 under Army Order 241. When initially formed as the MPSC, the corps were based in strategical footholds all over the world. As of 2023 the MPS regiment only retains the following custody facilities:

- The Military Corrective Training Centre (MCTC), Colchester.
- Service Custody Facility (SCF) South, Bulford.
- SCF North, Catterick.
- SCF Scotland, Edinburgh.
- SCF NI, NI.
- SCF Midlands and Wales, Stafford.
- Camp Tapa SCF, Estonia.
- BATUS SCF, Canada.

In 2022, Conservative MP, Will Quince, signed up to be a reservist in the corps.

As of 2024, all of the regiment's regular members hold a minimum rank of corporal.

== MPS Regiment ==
In December 2014, the Military Provost Staff Regiment was formed as part of 1st Military Police Brigade. The regiment is currently organised as follows:

- Regimental Headquarters, at Berechurch Hall Camp, Colchester Garrison
  - Headquarters Company
  - No. 1 Company (Army Reserve)
  - SCF Company
  - Detention Company

The Commanding Officer of the regiment is a Lieutenant Colonel and also holds the title of Commandant, Military Corrective Training Centre.
