= Lancaster City Museum =

Museum in Lancashire, England

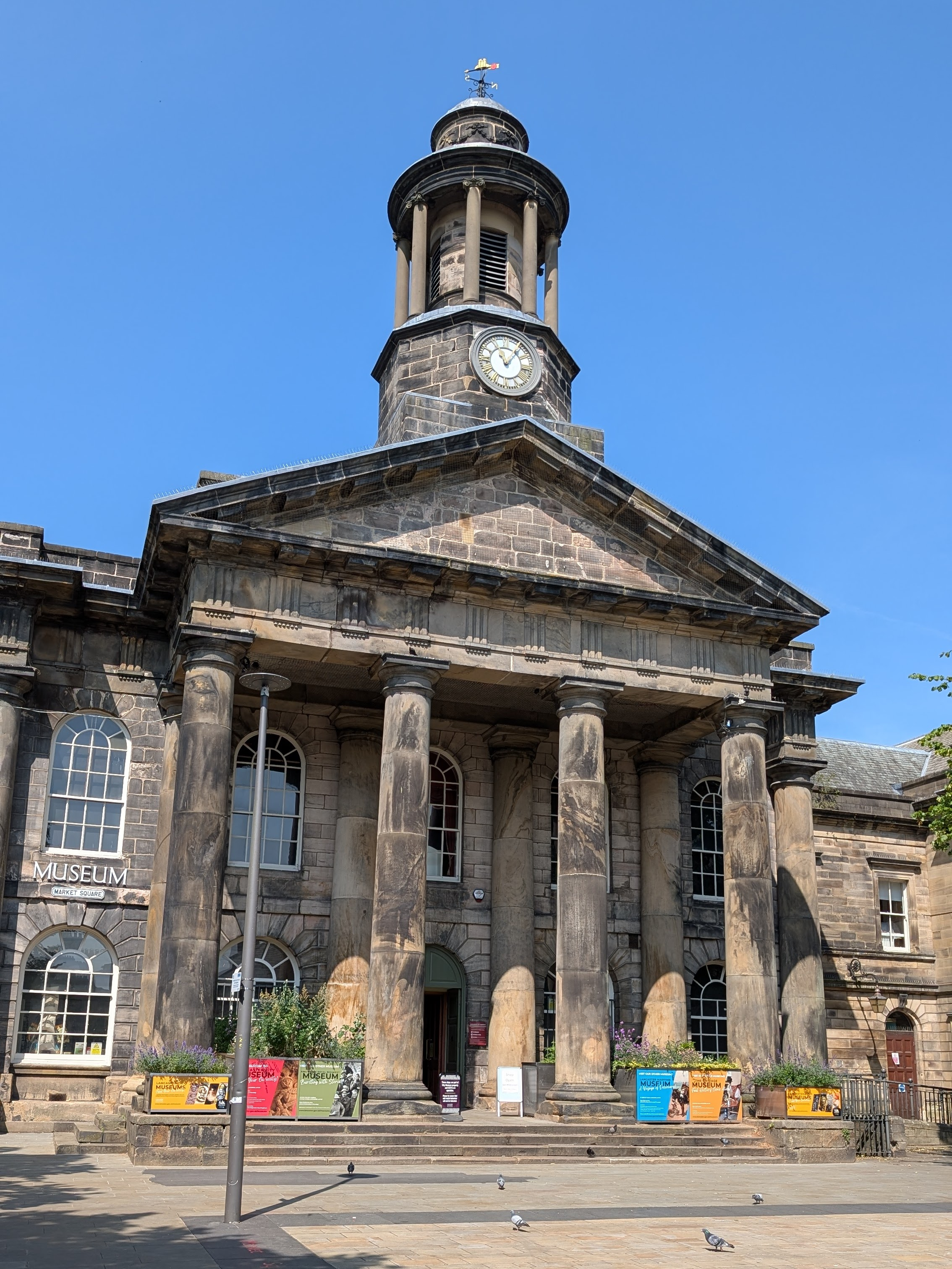
- The museum, seen across Market Square

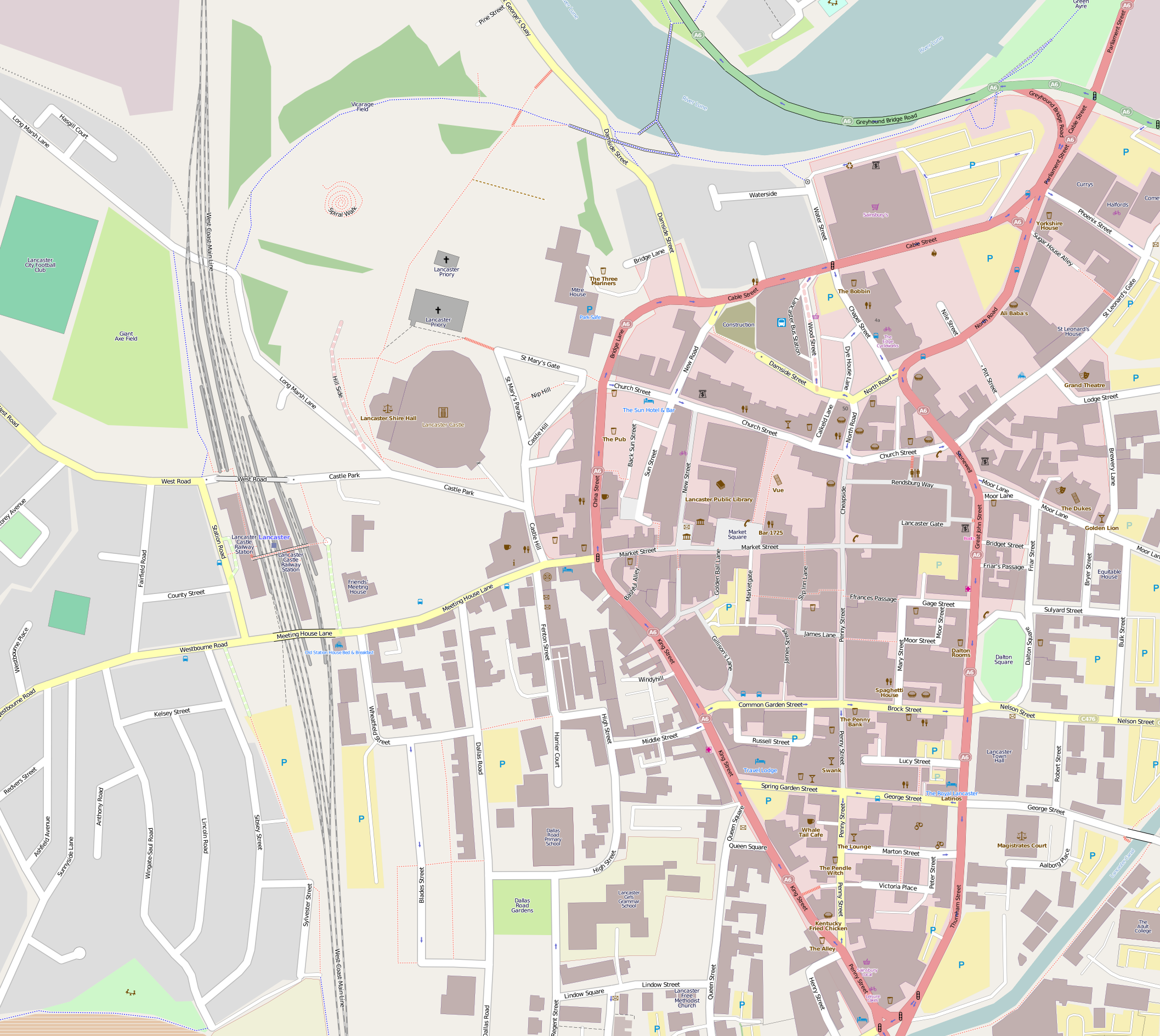
- Location within Lancaster city centre
- Former names: Old Town Hall

General information
- Type: Museum
- Location: Lancaster, Lancashire, England
- Coordinates: 54.0489°N 2.8017°W
- Construction started: 1781
- Completed: 1783
- Opened: (as Lancaster City Museum) 1923

Technical details
- Material: Sandstone ashlar with slate roof
- Floor count: 3

Design and construction
- Architect: Major Thomas Jarrett
- Main contractor: Robert Charnley and Robert Dickinson

Website
- www.lancaster.gov.uk/sites/museums/city

Listed Building – Grade II*
- Official name: City Museum, The Old Town Hall
- Designated: 22 December 1953
- Reference no.: 1194971

Lancaster City Museum is a museum in Lancaster, Lancashire, England. It is housed in the former Lancaster Town Hall building in Market Square.

== History ==
The Old Town Hall building in which the museum is housed is recorded in the National Heritage List for England as a designated Grade II* listed building. It was designed by Major Thomas Jarrett and built between 1781 and 1783, with a cupola added in 1782 to a design by Thomas Harrison. It was extended in 1871 and 1886. In 1910 the functions of the Town Hall were transferred to a new building in nearby Dalton Square. The old Town Hall was converted into a museum in 1923.

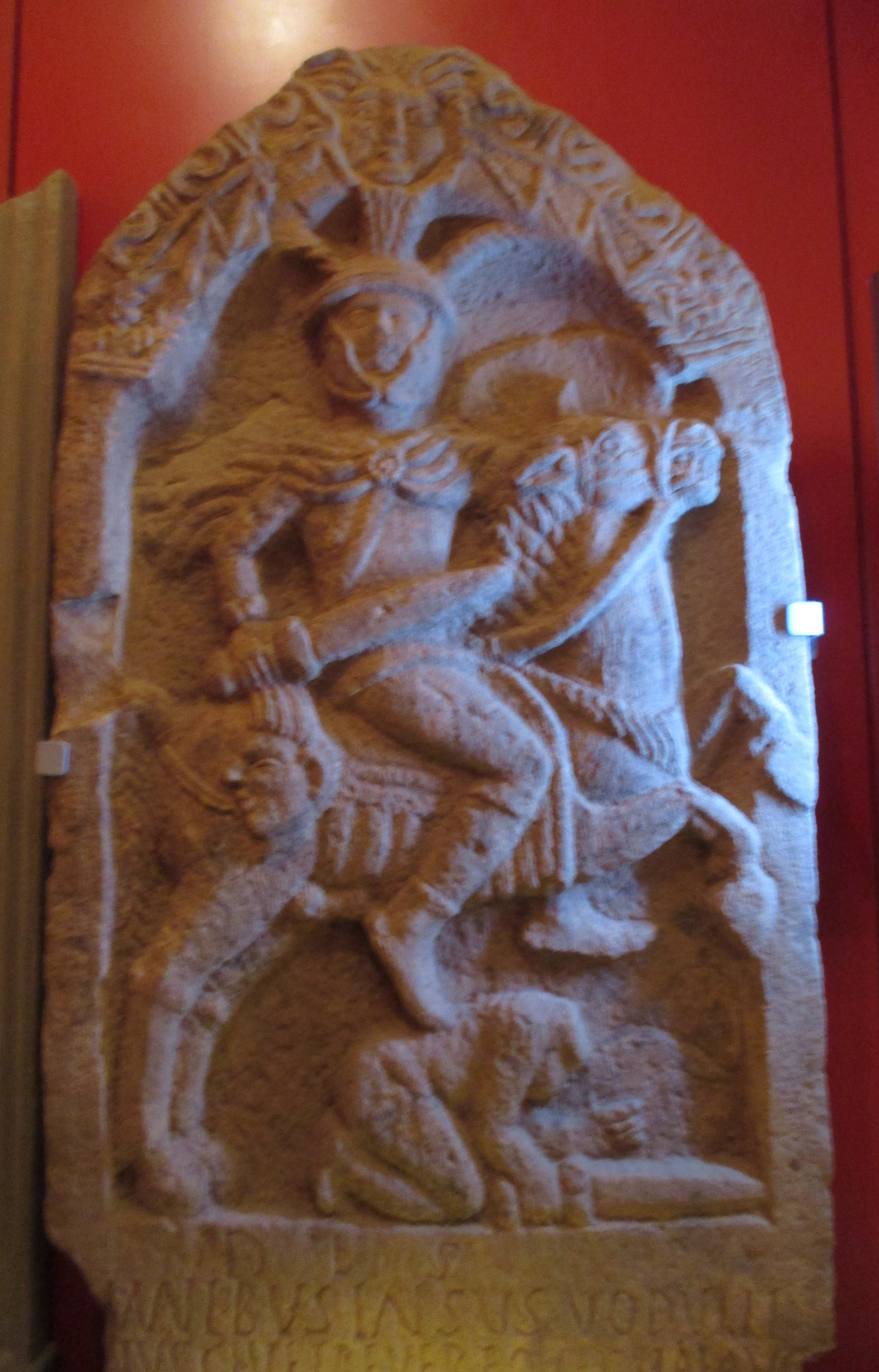
The Lancaster Roman Tombstone

The building is a two-storey structure built from sandstone ashlar, fronted by a projecting tetrastyle Tuscan portico. The façade presents five bays with round-arched windows and, in the centre under the portico, a round-arched door at the top of a set of four steps. The cupola surmounting the building has a square base with a second octagonal stage on the side of which is a clock face. Above is a round drum surrounded by a rotunda of Ionic columns, capped by a dome. The hour-striking turret clock dates from 1851 and is still hand wound each week; its maker's plate reads 'Wm Poulton, Lancaster, 1851' and a separate plate records it as 'The Gift of Henry Gregson Esq, Mayor, 1851'. The ground floor was originally open and contained an arcade housing a market for grain and butter. The openings to the arcade were later filled with the current ground-floor windows. The building has served a number of purposes over the years; as well as housing Lancaster's Council Chamber and subsequently the City Museum, it also housed the town court (complete with lock-ups) and branches of Barclays Bank (until 1969) and the National Westminster Bank (until 1977).

== Collections ==
The museum was founded in 1923, and its collections illustrate the archaeology and history of the city and surrounding areas. Among its highlights is the Lancaster Roman Tombstone, a memorial dating from c. 100 AD which was found locally in 2005. It depicts a Roman soldier on horseback with a decapitated opponent at his feet, and is described as "an iconic piece of Lancaster's dramatic past [giving] a crucial insight into the history of the county." The museum was also successful in acquiring the Viking-era Silverdale Hoard, discovered in the City of Lancaster district in 2011, for its collection. The collections also include the King's Own Royal Regiment Museum.

The Museums, Libraries and Archives Council granted the museum "Accredited" status; since 1 October 2011 accreditation is a responsibility of Arts Council England.

== Gallery ==
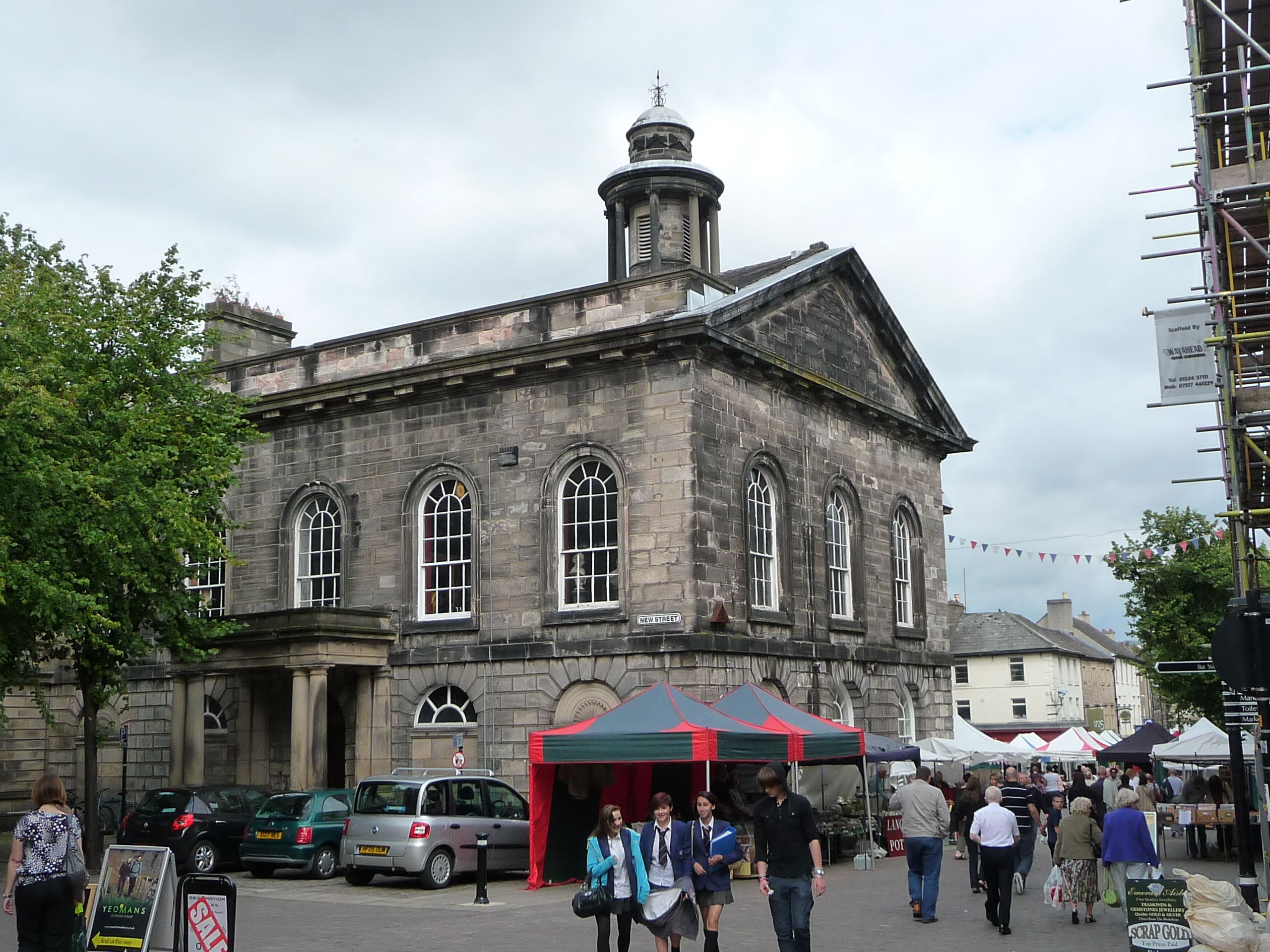
The rear of the museum, on New Street, 2011

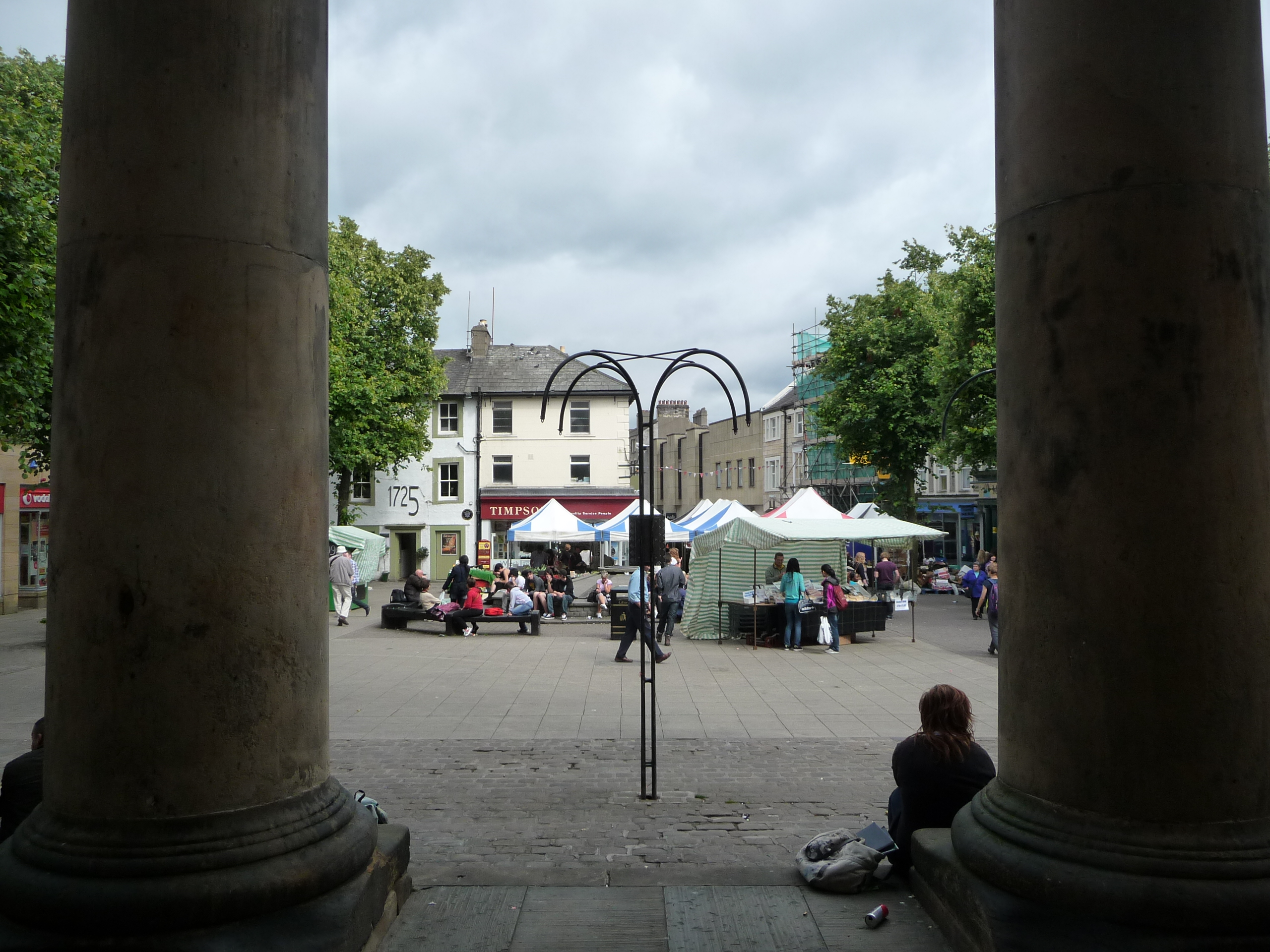
View to the east, across Market Square, from the museum entrance, 2011

== See also ==
- Grade II* listed buildings in Lancashire
- Listed buildings in Lancaster, Lancashire
- List of works by Thomas Harrison
