= Lower Barracks =

Military installation in Winchester, United Kingdom

- Winchester
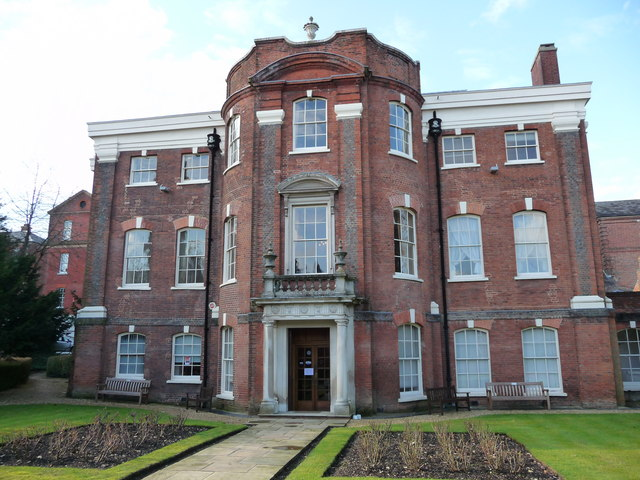
- Serle's House, part of the Lower Barracks

Site information
- Type: Barracks
- Owner: Ministry of Defence
- Operator: British Army

Location
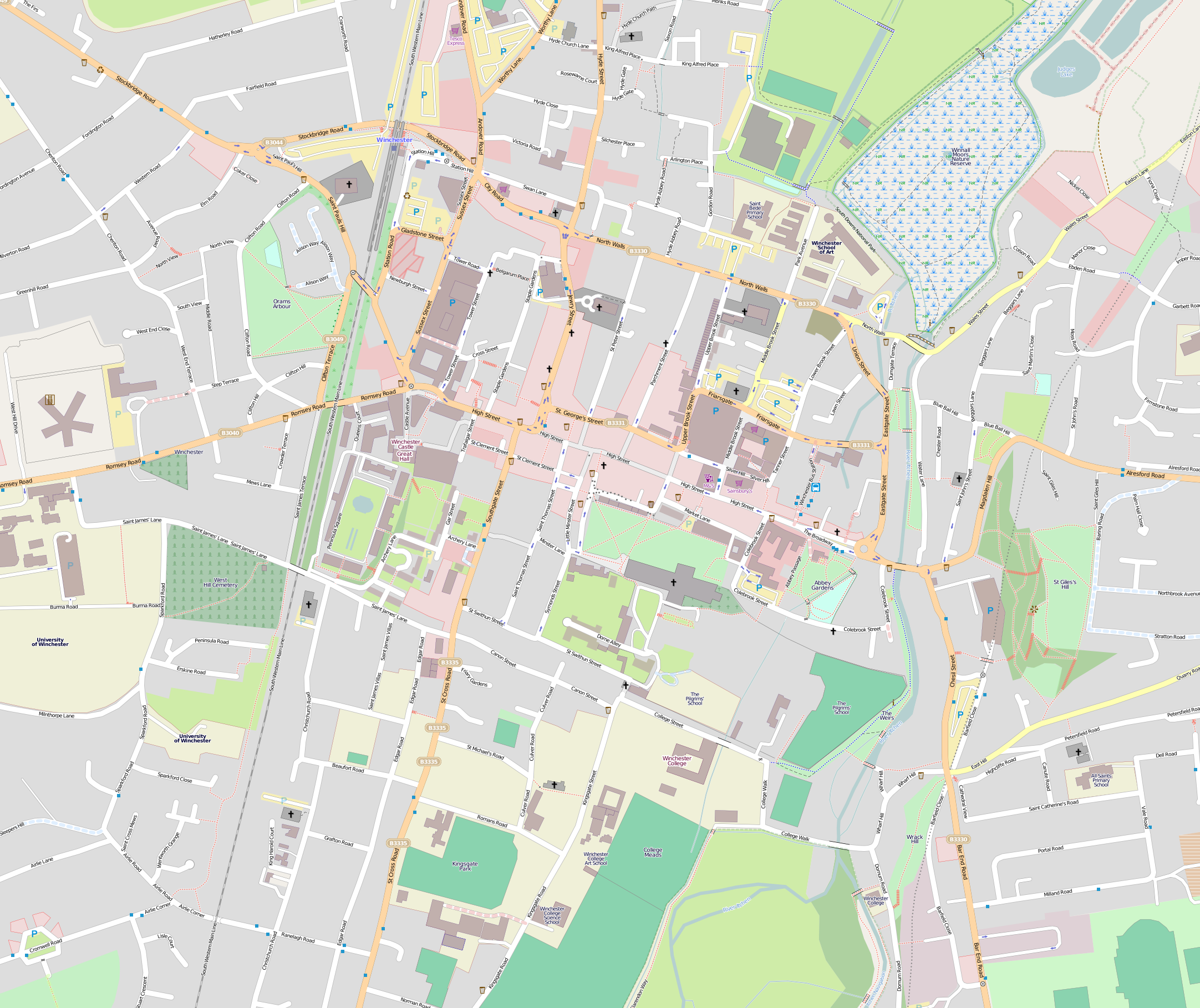
- Location within Winchester
- Coordinates: 51°03′42″N 1°19′06″W

Site history
- Built: 1796
- Built for: War Office
- In use: 1796-1959

Garrison information
- Occupants: Royal Hampshire Regiment

Lower Barracks was a military installation in Winchester. It was the depot of the Royal Hampshire Regiment from its formation in 1881 until it moved out in 1959. The Royal Hampshire Regiment Museum reopened at Serle's House in 2004. It is one of several independent museums that comprise Winchester's Military Museums.

== History ==
The buildings at the Lower Barracks at Winchester date back to 1730 when Serle's House, which had been designed by Thomas Archer, was built for William Sheldon. The house was acquired by James Serle, a lawyer, in 1781 and then sold to the War Office in 1796. Most of the other buildings in the Lower Barracks, including a barrack block and a small parade ground, were built during the Crimean War. In 1873 a system of recruiting areas based on counties was instituted under the Cardwell Reforms and the barracks became the depot for the 37th (North Hampshire) Regiment of Foot and the 67th (South Hampshire) Regiment of Foot. Following the Childers Reforms, the 37th and 67th regiments amalgamated to form the Royal Hampshire Regiment with its depot in the barracks in 1881.

The Lower Barracks were demoted to the status of out-station to the Wessex Brigade depot at Topsham Barracks in Exeter in 1959. Serle's House was retained by the Ministry of Defence but many of the other buildings were converted for private residential use in the late 1990s.

== Royal Hampshire Regiment Museum ==
The Royal Hampshire Regiment Museum reopened at Serle's House in 2004. The museum contains a display of drums, uniforms and personal artifacts.
