= St Michael's Leper Hospital =

Former hospital in Warwick, England

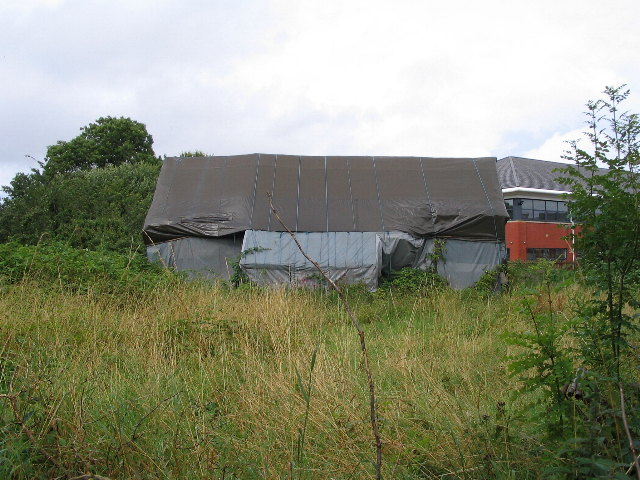
- The Master's House, 2007
- Interactive map of St Michael's Leper Hospital
- Location: Saltisford, Warwick, Warwickshire, England
- Coordinates: 52.28617°N 1.59542°W

Listed Building – Grade II*
- Official name: 4, 5 and 6, St Michael's Place
- Designated: 10 January 1953
- Reference no.: 1364850

Listed Building – Grade II*
- Official name: 108 and 108A, Saltisford
- Designated: 10 January 1953
- Reference no.: 1035366

Scheduled monument
- Official name: St Michael's Hospital, Warwick
- Designated: 15 October 1979
- Reference no.: 1011035

The remaining ruins of St Michael's Leper Hospital, a mediaeval hospital, lie in a patch of scrubland in the Saltisford area in the north of the town of Warwick, England, and are of the last remaining leper hospital in England. The hospital, which was founded by Roger, Earl of Warwick in about 1135, is classified by English Heritage as a scheduled monument. The remains of two of the hospital buildings can still be seen on the site - a chapel and the 15th century, two-storey Master's House. They are both grade II* listed buildings.

== History ==
The hospital was founded by Roger de Beaumont, 2nd Earl of Warwick, in the vicinity of a church of the same name towards the end of the reign of Henry I of England, in about 1135. The warden was a priest. In the 15th century the chapel was probably rebuilt after its parish was merged with the Collegiate Church of St Mary, Warwick. The half-timbered, two-storey Master's House was also constructed around this time.

In 1978 the then owner of Warwick Castle renovated the chapel had plans to move the buildings to the castle site but this was never realized. The structural problems of the surviving Master's House mean that it is listed on Historic England's Heritage at Risk Register as 'very bad'. In 2018 it was announced that after lying unused and covered up for "almost four decades" £530,000 would be allocated to the site to use it for supported housing, preserving the older buildings in their current condition as best as possible.

On January 15 2021, Warwick District Council announced a Compulsory Purchase Order had been served on the owner of the site of the hospital to enable the scheme to proceed. On 13 July 2025 it was announced that the buildings would be converted to affordable housing, following the award of a £2.8 million grant from the National Lottery Heritage Fund.

== Architecture ==
The two-storey "Master's" (or "Priest's") House stands furthest back from the road. It is timber-framed, although some additions have been made with bricks and concrete.

== Bibliography ==
- Page, William, ed. (1908). A History of the County of Warwick: Volume 2. Victoria County History.
- Stephens, W.B., ed. (1969). A History of the County of Warwick: Volume 8: The City of Coventry and Borough of Warwick. Victoria County History.
