= Museum of the Adjutant General's Corps =

The Adjutant General's Corps (AGC) Museum
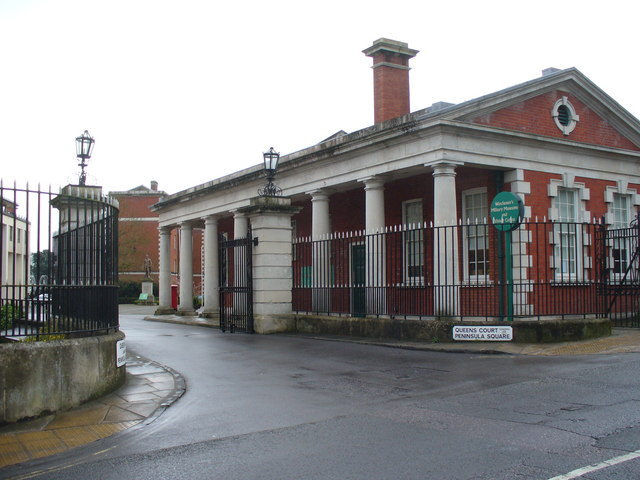

- Location of the museum within Hampshire
- Established: November 2003
- Location: Peninsula Barracks, Romsey Road, Winchester, Hampshire
- Coordinates: 51.06331°N 1.31997°W
- Type: Military Museum
- Website: www.agcmuseum.org.uk

The Adjutant General's Corps Museum, also known as The AGC Museum, is a visitor attraction at Peninsula Barracks in Winchester. It displays the history of the Adjutant General's Corps and its antecedents through objects, text, photographs, and dioramas.

== History ==
The museum was opened in 2003, and brought together the collection of the Royal Army Pay Corps, which had been at Worthy Down Camp, the collection of the Royal Army Educational Corps, which had been at Eltham Palace, elements of the collection of the Women's Royal Army Corps, which had been at Queen Elizabeth Barracks in Guildford and elements of the collection of the Royal Military Police, the majority of which remains at The RMP Museum, Southwick Park. The museum also holds collections related to the other antecedents of the AGC, the Army Legal Corps (Army Legal Services Branch) and the Military Provost Staff Corps. The museum is displayed in a chronological order, from the 18th century to the formation of the AGC in 1992, to present day.
