= Royal Regiment of Fusiliers Museum (Royal Warwickshire) =

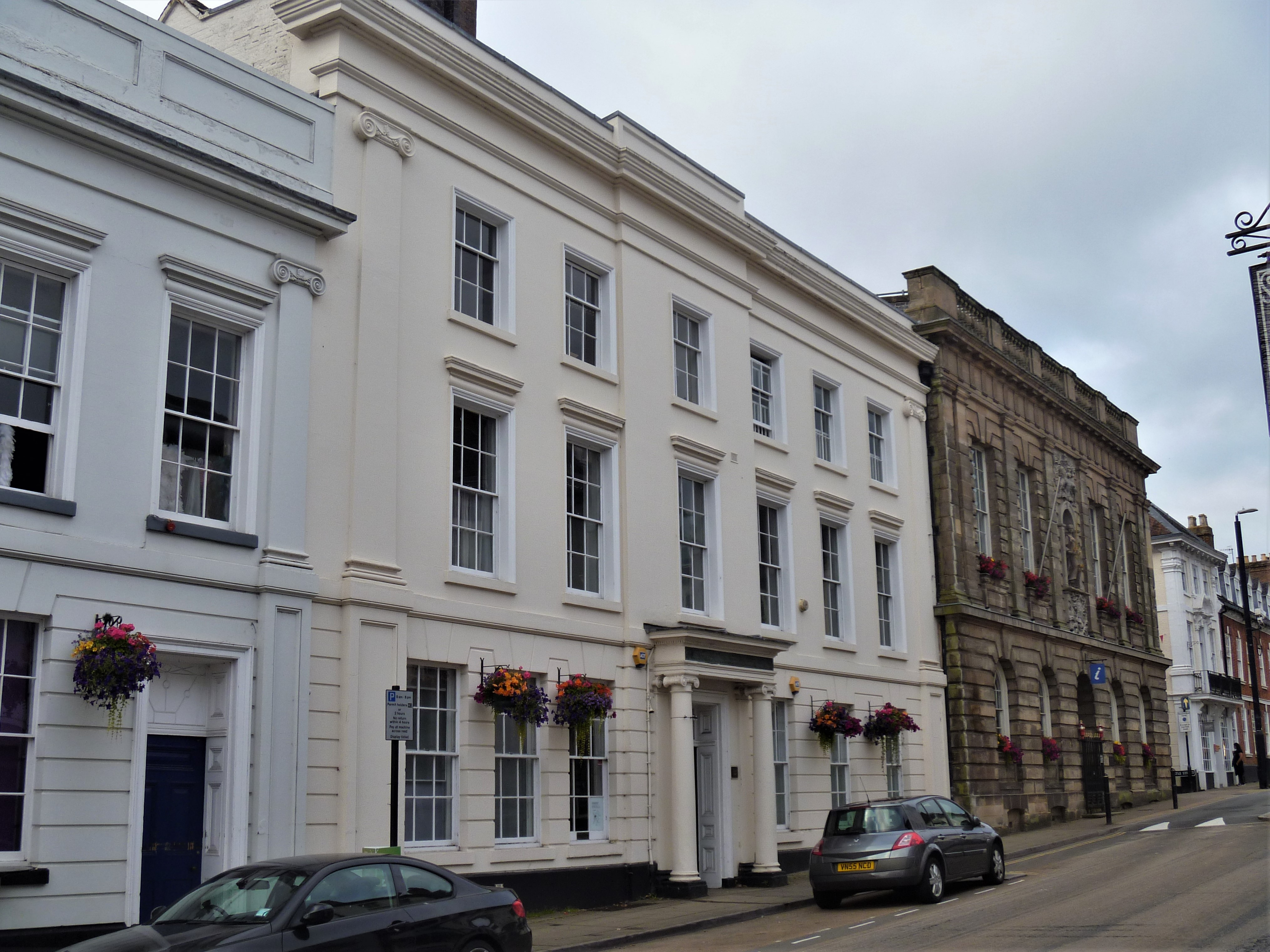
- Pageant House

- Shown in Warwickshire
- Established: 1961
- Location: Pageant House, Jury Street, Warwick
- Coordinates: 52.2812°N 1.5872°W
- Type: Regimental museum
- Website: warwickfusiliers.co.uk

The Royal Regiment of Fusiliers Museum (Royal Warwickshire) is situated at Pageant House in Jury Street, Warwick, England.

== History ==
The trustees of the museum joined forces with Warwickshire County Council to acquire St John's House in 1961. The Council opened their museum of the ground floor and the trustees of the regimental museum occupied the first floor. Both museums were opened by Field Marshal Viscount Montgomery on 2 August 1961. The Royal Regiment of Fusiliers Museum was reopened by his son, David Montgomery, 2nd Viscount Montgomery of Alamein, in 2001 following a major refurbishment with the help of the Heritage Lottery Fund.

The museum moved to new premises at Pageant House in Jury Street in April 2023.

== Collections ==
The museum tells the history of the County infantry Regiment. This includes the present Regiment, the Royal Regiment of Fusiliers and the antecedent Regiments going down the line of the Royal Warwickshire Fusiliers (the Royal Warwickshire Regiment and the 6th Regiment of Foot).

The museum is an Accredited museum (a national scheme run by the Arts Council), a registered charity, governed by a group of trustees, and is supported by the Ministry of Defence. The Royal Regiment of Fusiliers was created in 1968 after the amalgamation of four regiments. Thus the museum is part of a family of other Fusilier museums: the Fusiliers Museum of Northumberland in Alnwick Castle, the Fusilier Museum (Lancashire) in Bury and the Fusiliers Museum (London) at the Tower of London.

In November 2020, the museum purchased at auction the Memorial Plaque of Euan Lucie-Smith of the Royal Warwickshire's 1st Battalion, one of the first mixed-heritage infantry officers in a regular British Army regiment, and the first killed in World War I, at the Second Battle of Ypres on 25 April 1915 .
