= Fusiliers Museum of Northumberland =

Regimental museum in Alnwick, England

- The Abbot's Tower, at the far end of the lawn, home to the Fusiliers Museum of Northumberland

- Shown within Northumberland
- Established: 1929
- Location: Alnwick, Northumberland, England
- Coordinates: 55.416°N 1.706°W
- Website: www.northumberlandfusiliers.org.uk

The Fusiliers Museum of Northumberland, formerly the Northumberland Fusiliers Museum, is a museum located within the 14th century Abbot's Tower of Alnwick Castle in Alnwick, Northumberland, England. It displays the history of the Fusiliers from 1674 to the present day.

== History ==
The museum was first established at Fenham Barracks in Newcastle upon Tyne in 1929 but moved to Alnwick Castle in 1970. The museum received National Lottery funding and was redeveloped between 2014 and 2017.

== Collection ==
The museum displays the history of the Royal Northumberland Fusiliers and its predecessor regiments from 1674 to current times. It is an independent registered charity. It also displays artifacts such as the nameplate from the steam locomotive "Private E Sykes VC" which commemorated the soldier who had been awarded the Victoria Cross while serving with the regiment. It holds items belonging to soldiers such as letters, diaries, drawings, photographs and other possessions that give a personal insight into the experience of being a Fusilier. Items on display date back to the 18th century.

The Royal Regiment of Fusiliers was created in 1968 after the amalgamation of four Regiments. Thus the museum is part of a family of other Fusilier museums: the Royal Regiment of Fusiliers Museum (Royal Warwickshire) in Warwick, the Fusilier Museum (Lancashire) in Bury and the Fusiliers Museum (London) at the Tower of London.

== Victoria Crosses held by the museum ==
The museum holds the Victoria Crosses, the highest military award in the British Forces, awarded to the following members of the regiment:

- Sergeant Robert Grant 5th Regiment of Foot (Indian Rebellion)
- Second Lieutenant James Johnson 2nd Battalion, Northumberland Fusiliers (First World War)
- Private Patrick McHale 5th Regiment of Foot (Indian Rebellion)
- Sergeant Peter McManus 5th Regiment of Foot (Indian Rebellion)
- Private Ernest Sykes 27th Battalion, Northumberland Fusiliers (First World War)

== See also ==
- Royal Northumberland Fusiliers
