= Shire Hall, Warwick =

County building in Warwick, Warwickshire, England

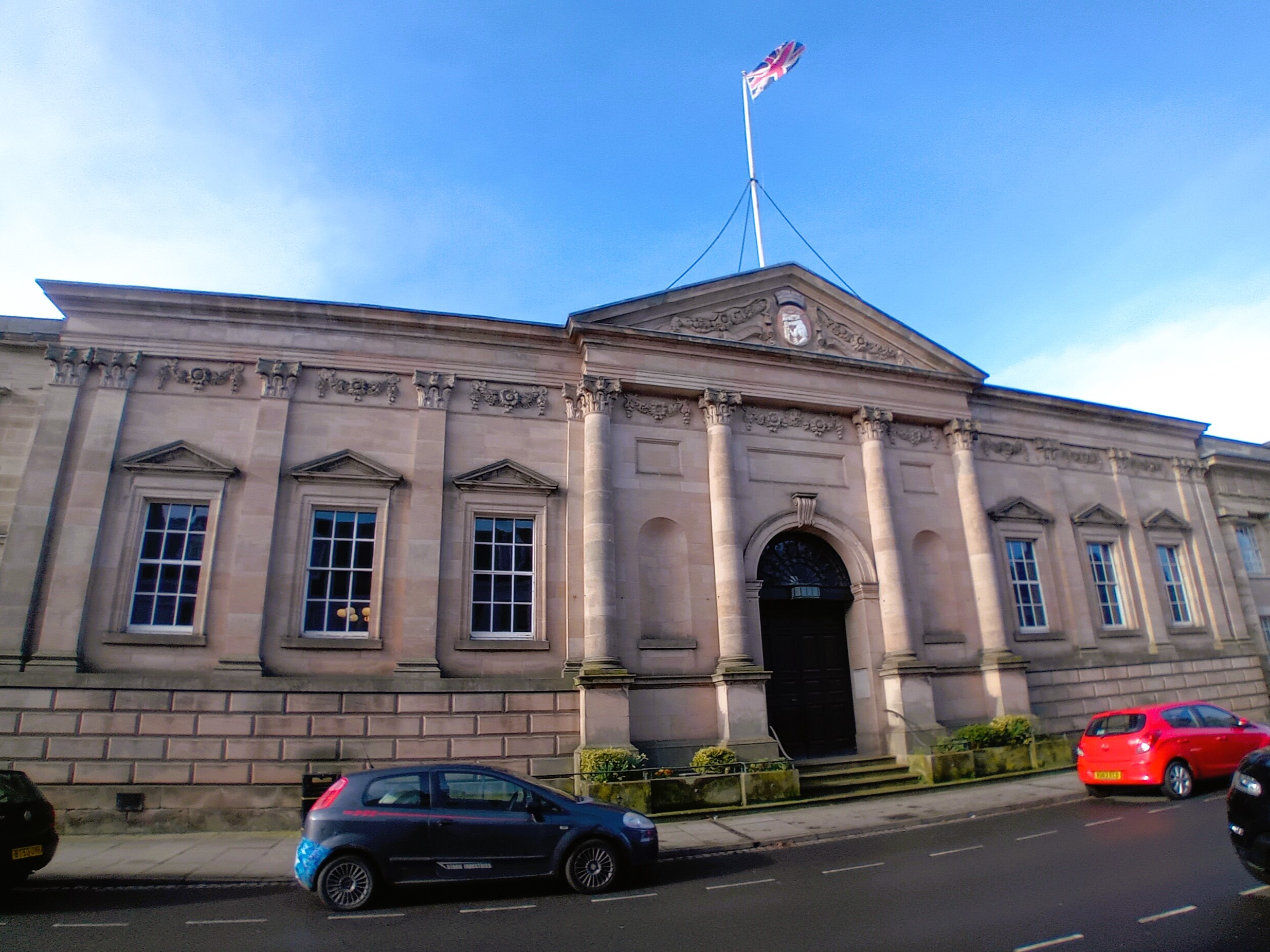
- The Shire Hall
- Interactive map of Shire Hall, Warwick
- 52.2829°N 1.5891°W
- Location: Northgate Street, Warwick, Warwickshire, England

History
- Built: 1758

Site notes
- Architect: Sanderson Miller

Listed Building – Grade I
- Official name: The Old Shire Hall and Law Courts
- Designated: 10 January 1953
- Reference no.: 1184979

Shire Hall is a building complex located in Northgate Street in Warwick, England. It is the main office and the meeting place of Warwickshire County Council. It comprises both the original Shire Hall of 1758 and the more recent adjoining county council offices, both of which are Grade I listed buildings.

== History ==
=== The first hall ===
Although Warwick was founded much earlier, it was not incorporated as a borough until 1545 and it was only in 1576 that justice became a borough matter rather than that of the earls. Little is known about the first hall built on the site following this declaration except that £1,161 was levied for repairs and alterations (and the erection of a gaol next door) in May 1674 to be raised by taxes. Work was undertaken by William Hurlbert who had previously erected the town's Market Hall and refurbished Warwick Castle. Due to the fact that it was a sturdy brick-built structure the hall survived the Great Fire of Warwick on 5 September 1694 which destroyed all the surrounding town centre buildings.

=== The current building ===
Warwick Shire Hall Act 1757
- Act of Parliament
- Parliament of Great Britain
- Long title: An Act for re-building and keeping in Repair the Shire Hall of the County of Warwick.
- Citation: 30 Geo. 2. c. 56
- Territorial extent: Great Britain

Dates
- Royal assent: 6 May 1757
- Commencement: 2 December 1756 (Note: Start of session.)

Status: Current legislation

Text of statute as originally enacted

The original sections of the existing building, which were designed by Sanderson Miller, were constructed by local brothers William and David Hiorn between 1753 and 1758. The design involved a symmetrical main frontage of nine bays facing onto Northgate Street; the central section of three bays featured a round headed doorway flanked by Corinthian order columns supporting a frieze and a pediment containing the county council coat of arms. The principal rooms included a Grand Jury Room on the first floor and the courtrooms on the ground floor.

The building was originally used as a facility for dispensing justice but, following the implementation of the Local Government Act 1888, which established county councils in every county, it also became the meeting place of Warwickshire County Council.

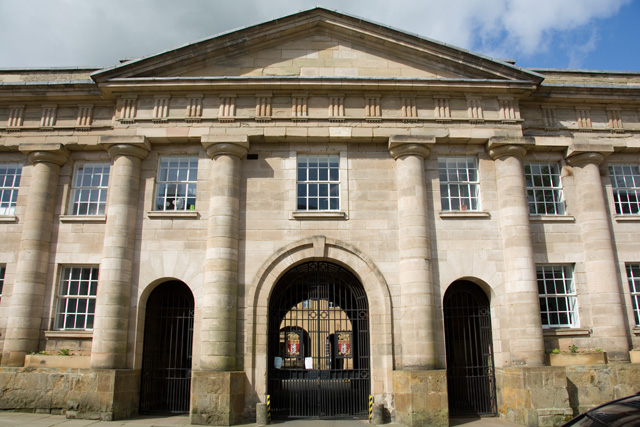
Frontage of old gaol to Northgate Street, built 1783 and retained when new county council offices built on site of gaol in 1929–1932

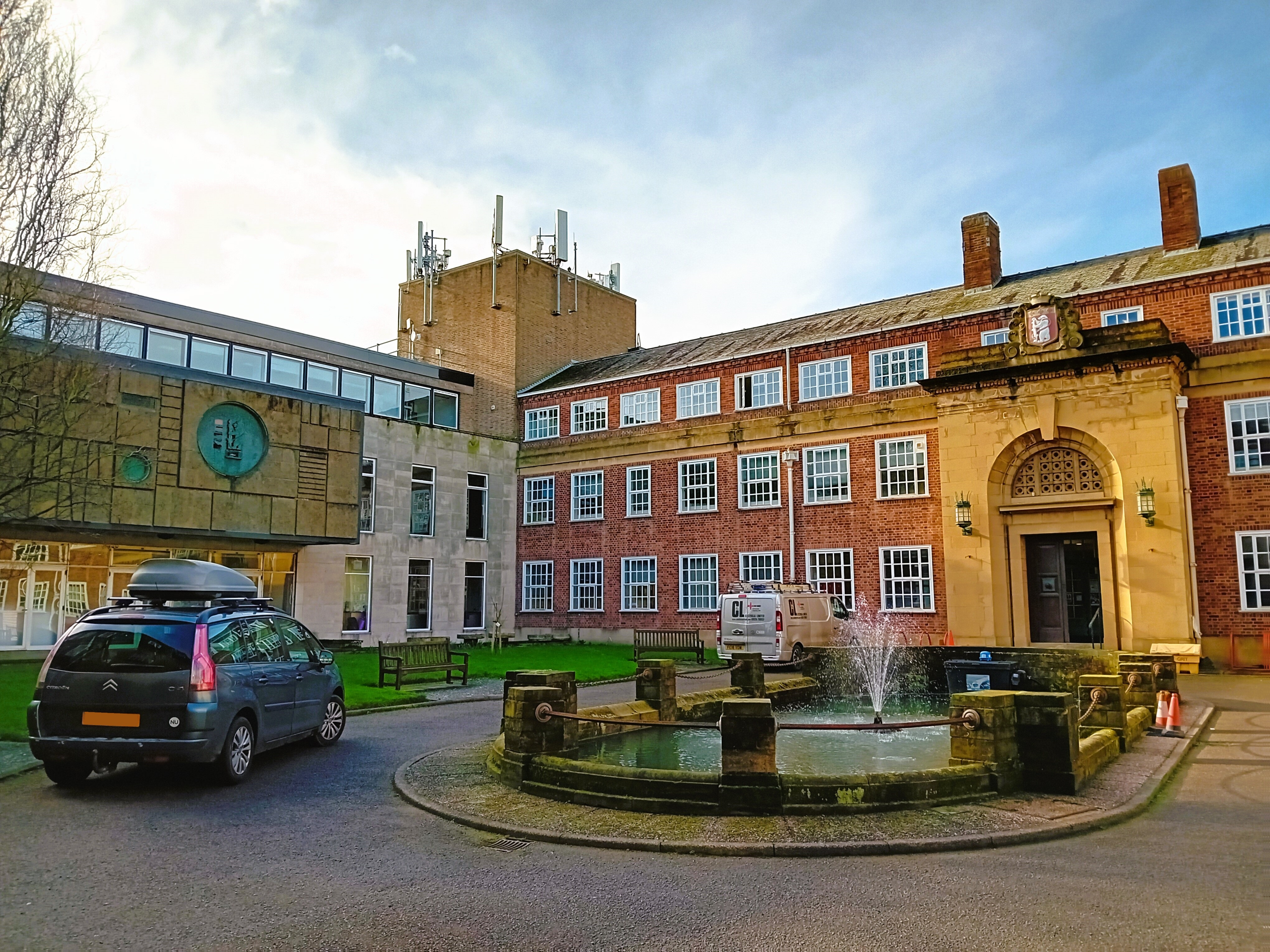
Internal courtyard showing the 1929–1932 buildings to the right and the 1966 wing to the left

The first major extension of the complex beyond the traditional hall and court rooms took place in 1932. Massively increasing its size the complex spread northward, incorporating the frontage of the old gaol, towards the former barracks, onto the site where the Militia Hall had once stood.

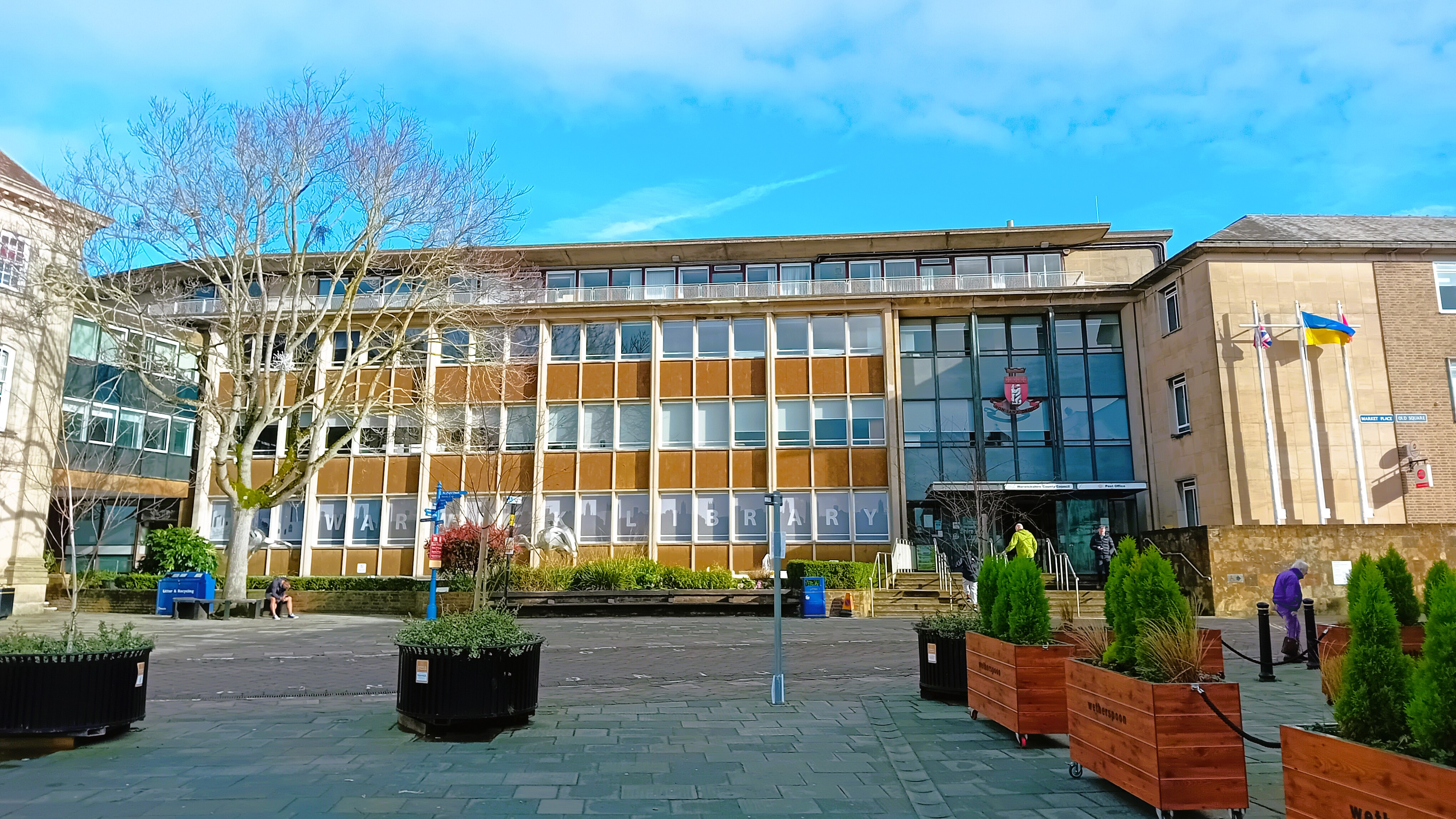
1966 frontage to Market Place, incorporating the main entrance.

The building was brought up to its current size by construction of a new council chamber and further offices in 1958 and a final expansion in 1966, which included a new frontage and main public entrance for the complex facing Market Place. The latter two developments are classic examples of Brutalist architecture. The Queen Elizabeth The Queen Mother officially opened the extension on 3 November 1966.

Included in these alterations were the relocation of the Warwickshire County Emergency Centre, effectively a bunker allowing emergency council business to continue during wartime or terrorist attacks. There are currently two man-made ponds located in the complex, one in the 1930s courtyard and another outside the 1966 section, with metallic sculptures of a heron and fishes added in 2000. The crown and county courts moved to the new Warwickshire Justice Centre in Leamington Spa in 2010.

The television series Father Brown was filmed in and around the Hall in 2014.

In 2024, auction consultant Adam Busiakiewicz collaborated with historian Aaron Manning after identifying a portrait of Henry VIII, commissioned by tapestry maker, Ralph Sheldon (1537–1613). The portrait had originally been listed as missing, yet was hanging unknowingly in the shire hall and was identified as the missing portrait, after a photograph of it appeared on X.
