= Lord Leycester =

Lord Leycester may refer to:

- Lord Leycester Hospital, a 400-year-old retirement home with a 600-year-old chapel on High Street, Warwick
- Lord Leycester Hotel, a 400-year-old hotel, inn, and private house on Jury Street, Warwick

== See also ==
- Robert Dudley, 1st Earl of Leicester, Earl of Leycester
- Lord Leicester
