= Castle Hill Baptist Church =

Church in Warwickshire, England

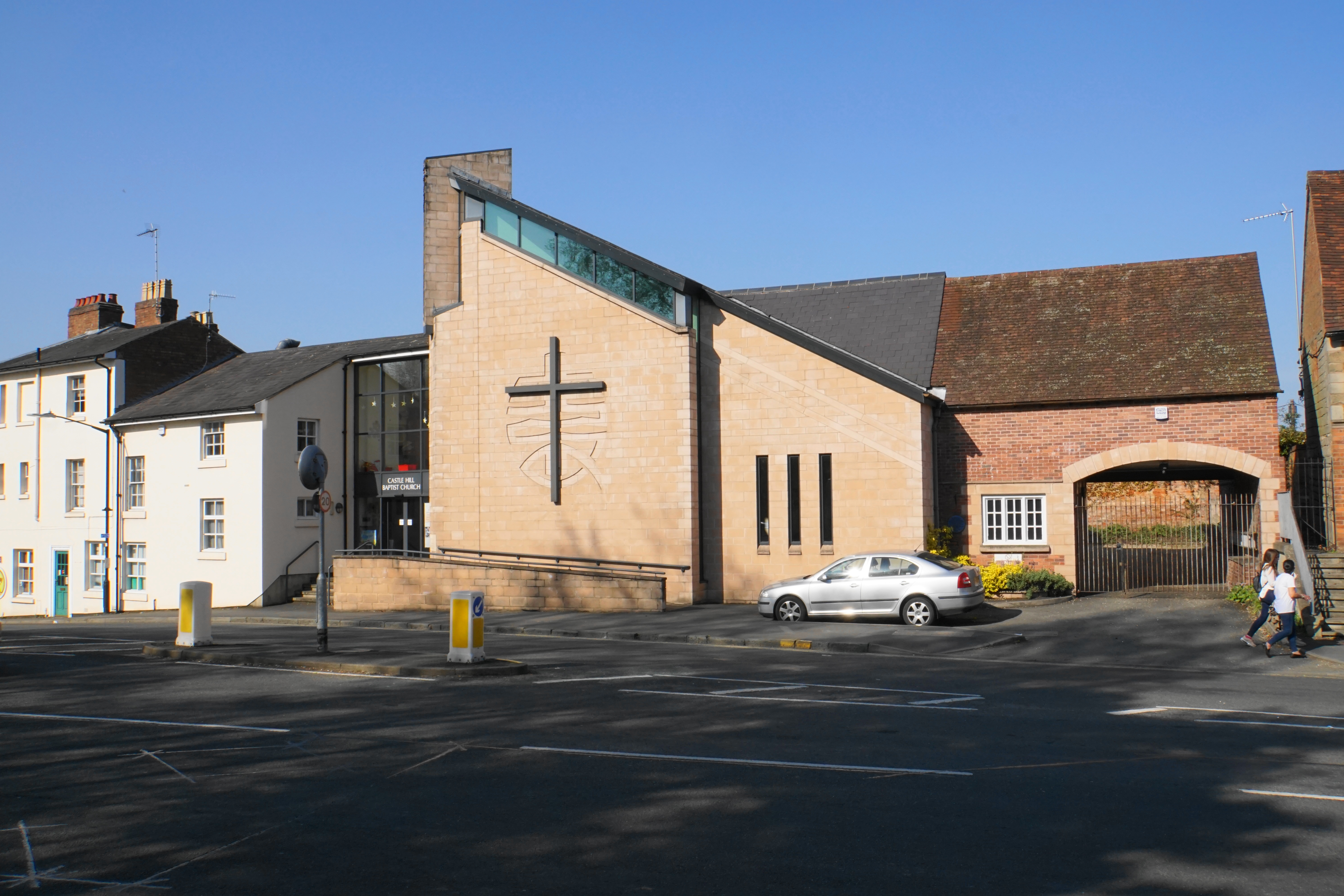
Castle Hill Baptist Church

Castle Hill Baptist Church in the town of Warwick in Warwickshire, England, is one of the oldest Baptist churches in the world. It was founded in the 17th century when non-conformist churches were undergoing persecution in England, although Castle Hill itself escaped much persecution due to the protection offered by Lord Brooke of Warwick Castle.

Due to the threat of persecution the church at first met in private houses. In 1655 the Midland Baptist Association (now termed the Heart of England Baptist Association) was founded at a meeting hosted by Castle Hill and attended by six other Baptist churches in the Midlands. In 1685 the church began meeting at its current site. It had been given a garden plot to act as a cemetery due to restrictions on non-Anglican burials in the graveyards of parish churches. For the next 15 years the church continued to meet in a house on the plot. However in 1700 the first purpose-built church building was constructed on the site. Other key developments of this period in the church's history include earliest date from which continuous church records exist (1697) and the introduction of hymn singing to the church around 1710.

The first church building only lasted some 40 years and shortly afterwards John Cohen Rylands became the minister of the church. Ryland's son was a co-founder of the Baptist Missionary Society. During the 18th century the membership of the church fluctuated between 30 and 100. Church membership was only open to those who were baptised as adults, and this did not change until 1930.

At the end of the 18th century, the church began a Sunday school. This did not stop the early years of the 19th century being hard ones. By 1820 the church was near closure and only the efforts of Lawrence Tatham, a deacon of the church, saved it. In the early 1830s the extension of the vote to a much larger section of the population by the Reform Acts caused the church to split. However by a decade later the congregation had grown so much that an extension to the church building was necessary.

Even this extension proved inadequate to the growing size of the church and in 1866 a much larger Gothic revival style church was built to replace the 1740s structure. That building was to serve the church for the next 120 years and it covered virtually the whole site, including the former graveyard. The 250th anniversary of the Midland Baptist Association in 1905 saw a refurbishment of the interior of the building and the fitting of a pipe organ.

By the mid-20th century the condition of the 1866 church building was causing serious concern. Woodworm had ravaged parts of the structure and dry rot was becoming a constant problem. The church membership had again shrunk and there was a severe danger of a re-run of the problems of 1820. The question of what to do about the old building was a seemingly insolvable problem due to the lack of monetary resources of the church.

In the end a new church building was erected, but the process of realising that project was a long one which began in 1970. In that year the pub which was then next door to the church came on the market. Through various trials, including the church secretary lending the church his pension fund, the pub and its accompanying car park were purchased. The purchase taxed the funds of the church to their utmost, limiting options until the loan was paid off. Further new premises were bought in 1976 when the church hall of the parish church of St Nicholas came on the market. The former pub saw use as general purpose church rooms, the church hall saw use for youth work and the car park was immensely helpful in the congested centre of Warwick. However the condition of the 1866 building was still deteriorating. By 1986 its condition had deteriorated so much that it was no longer safe to use for services. Sunday services were moved to the church hall in Gerard Street purchased a decade earlier.

The late 1980s and early 1990s saw progress begin in earnest on the new building. In 1993 Warwick Town Council, backed by English Heritage, stated that the 1866 building must be preserved, given its historic nature. The planning application for the new building was rejected. After more struggles, including with the Royal Fine Art Commission, a revised planning application for the new building was approved in 1997. Funding for the estimated £650,000 building cost was raised through a combination of congregation giving, charitable grants and bank loans. In April 1998 a final service was held in the old church before demolition. The new building was completed just under a year later.

The church has undergone a renaissance in its new building and holds many events including two Sunday services, a playgroup, toddlers' group, prayer meeting and youth group. In 2019 it was decided that both the church and the church hall would undergo £86,000 worth of re-furbishing in 2020. The current minister of the church is Reverend Kevin Johnson.
