= St Paul's Church, Warwick =

Coordinates: 52°16′47.6″N 01°35′37.7″W

St. Paul's Church, Warwick
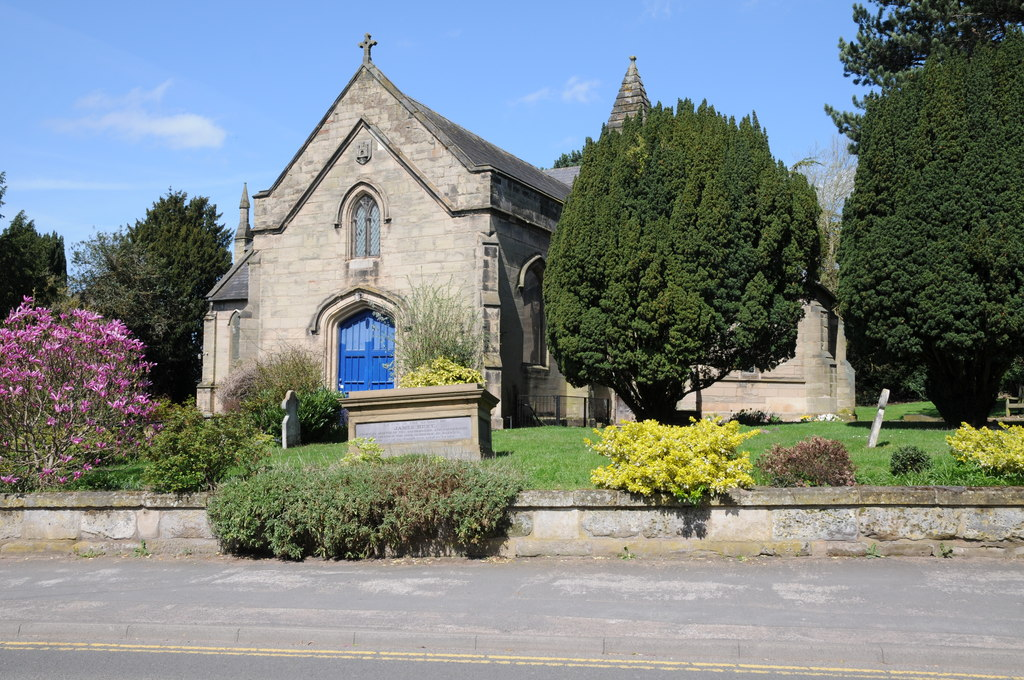
- St. Paul's Church, Warwick
- St. Paul's Church, Warwick
- OS grid reference: SP 28649 64930
- Denomination: Church of England
- Website: stpaulswarwick.co.uk

History
- Dedication: Paul the Apostle

Administration
- Province: Canterbury
- Diocese: Coventry
- Parish: Warwick: St Paul

St Paul's Church is an Anglican church located in Warwick, England. It is a Tudor Gothic Revival church built in 1844 and serves as the parish church for the St Paul parish.

== History ==
The land the church sits on began as a burial ground and a chapel. Churchyards at nearby St Mary and St Nicholas churches became full as Warwick's population boomed in the 19th century following the construction of the Warwick and Birmingham Canal. This led to the consecration of the chapel and cemetery on 23 July 1824, which was originally known as St Mary's Episcopal Chapel and served St Mary's church. The church itself began construction on 8 November 1842 by architect Richard Charles Hussey and was consecrated on 26 July 1844 by the Bishop of Worcester Isaac Maddox. Stone for the church was given by the Earl of Warwick. After consecration, the St Paul parish was formed out of the St Mary parish. New burials ceased in the churchyard in 1870.

The building was made a Grade II listed building on 19 March 1973.

== Design ==
The church has a T-shaped plan and the original chapel forms the south end. The south transept end faces the road at Friars Street and is in the Tudor Gothic Revival style. The nave addition by Hussey is in the Early English Gothic Revival style. The north side of the church has seven bays and the south has four. The interior east contains stained glass completed by William Holland's Holland of Warwick firm.
