= Market Place, Warwick =

Square in Warwick, United Kingdom

Coordinates: 52°16′55″N 1°35′25″W

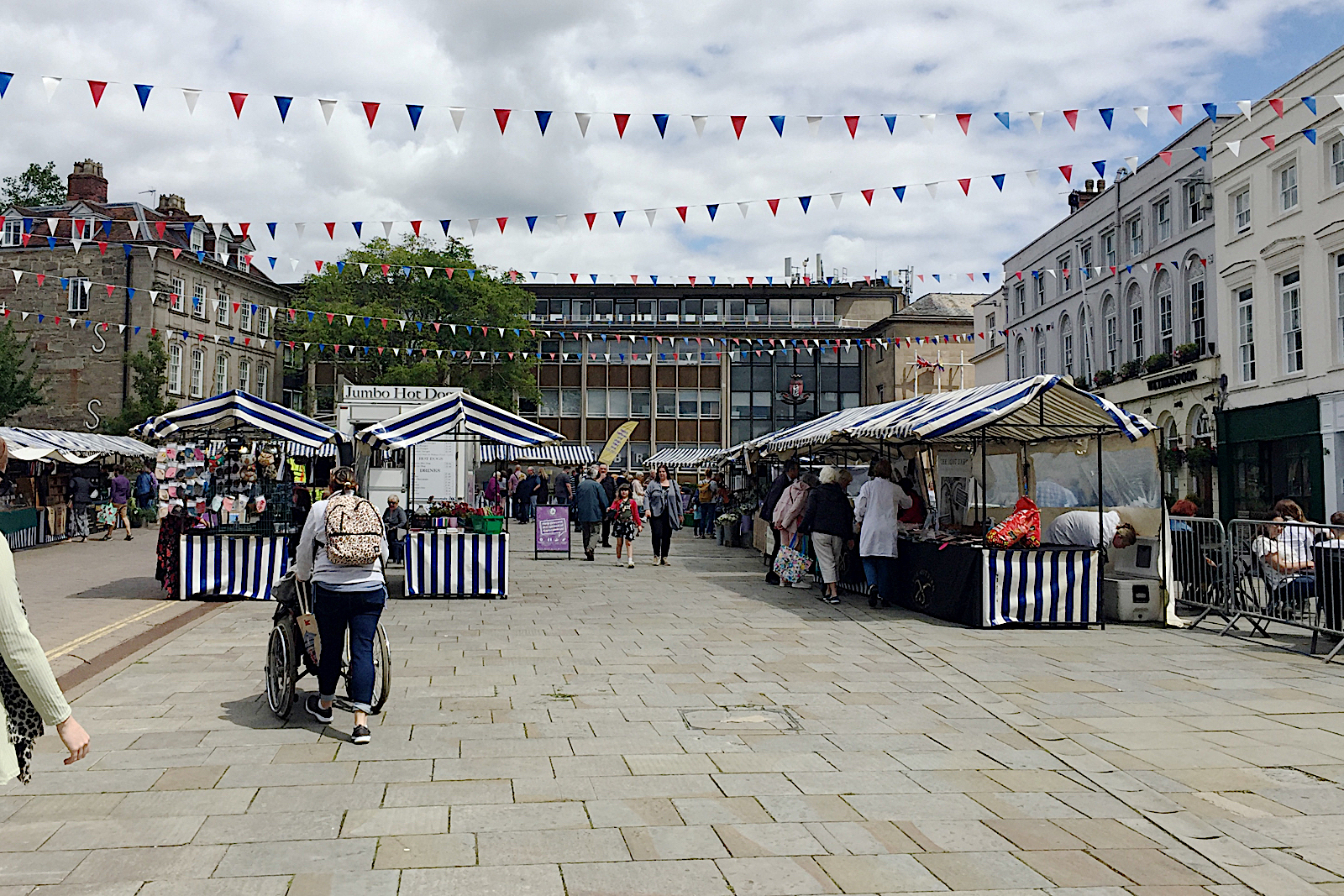
Market Square

Market Place is an open air urban space in Warwick, Warwickshire, England. It has for many centuries been the centre of the town taking on a number of functions during its history.

Although Warwick as a town dates from before the Norman Conquest, one of the earliest recorded events to take place in the square was the mop fair which was chartered in the 14th century by Edward III. The square was named Mount Pleasant in 1806 In 1855 a corn exchange was built at the south of square, was demolished in the mid-20th century and is now a row of shops with flats above. One of the oldest buildings left in the square is the Market Hall which was built in 1670. It exists today as a council run museum. There was a fountain in the middle of the square until the mid-20th century which has now been removed. Connected to its north east corner is the much smaller Old Square, containing St Mary's Church.

== The Square today ==
The square is bounded to the north by Shire Hall, the main offices of Warwickshire County Council and to the south by the Warwickshire County Museum which is located in the old Market Hall. The eastern and western edges contain shops, restaurants and pubs. Street markets take place each Saturday as well as Farmers' markets on the fifth Saturday of each month. For four nights of the year in October the square still hosts the mop, a travelling funfair. In the corner of the square is life sized statue of former World Middleweight boxing champion Randolph Turpin which was unveiled in 2001.

Although mostly pedestrianised there are two one-way streets on the north and west sides of the square and a small number of parking spaces. Public toilets are open during the day and early evening with separate facilities for men, women and disabled users. There are two public car parks and the town's main bus station within two minutes walk of the square.
