= William Hiorne =

William Hiorne (c. 1712 – 22 April 1776) was an architect and builder based in Warwick.

With his younger brother David Hiorne (1715–58), he worked for William Smith of Warwick and they succeeded Smith in business.

His son, Francis Hiorne also became an architect.

His memorial is in St Mary’s Church, Warwick.

== Works ==
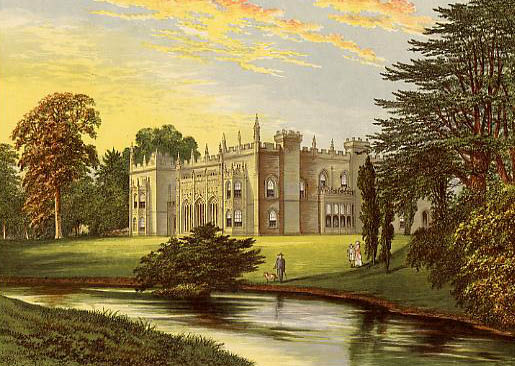
Arbury Hall

- Four Oaks Hall. 1740 remodelling
- Memorial to Thomas Cross Field, St Andrew’s Church, Rugby 1744
- St Michael's Church, Coventry 1747 new wings for the altar piece
- Arbury Hall, Warwickshire from c. 1748
- St Bartholomew’s Church, Birmingham 1749
- Memorial to Edward Action (d1747) in St Margaret’s Church, Acton Scott 1751
- Guys Cliffe House 1751
- Edgbaston Hall, Warwickshire 1751-52 internal alterations
- Rode Hall 1752
- King Edward's School, Birmingham 1752 library fittings
- Holy Cross Church, Daventry 1752–1758
- St Martin in the Bull Ring 1753 spire repairs and 1760 vestry and lobby at east end of the north aisle
- Kyre Park, Tenbury Wells 1753-56
- Delbury Hall, Diddlebury, Shropshire 1753-56
- Shire Hall, Warwick 1754–58 (built to the designs of Sanderson Miller)
- Derby Country Gaol 1755-56
- Meriden Hall, Warwickshire 1757-58 addition of attic
- Stable-block, Packington Hall, Warwickshire 1756–58 (designed by Sanderson Miller)
- St Mary's Church, Nottingham 1762 new west front
- Holy Trinity Church, Stratford-upon-Avon 1763-64 rebuilding of spire in stone
- St Leonard's Church, Over Whitacre 1766
