= Warwick =

County town of Warwickshire, England

Coordinates: 52.28°N 1.59°W

- Town
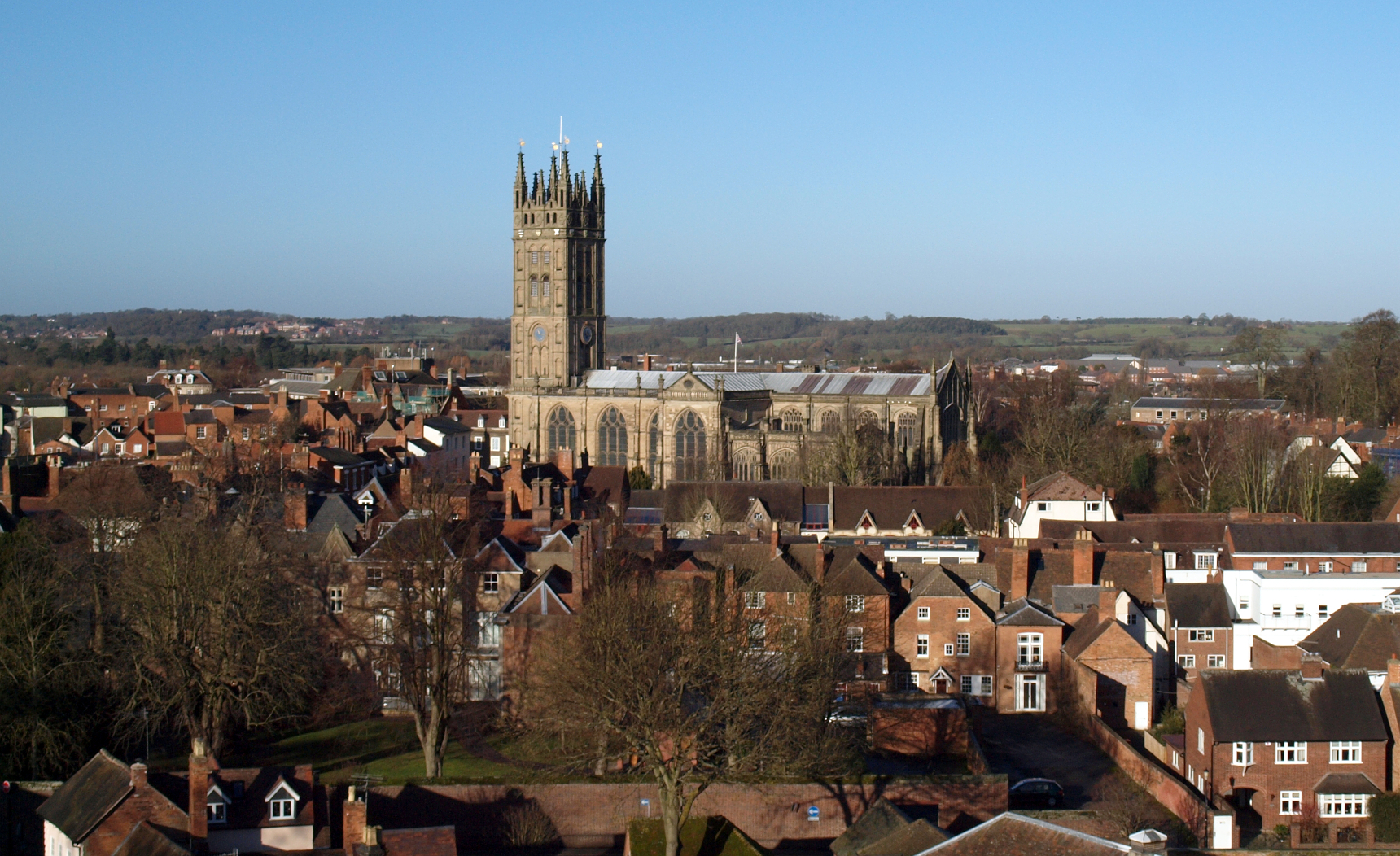
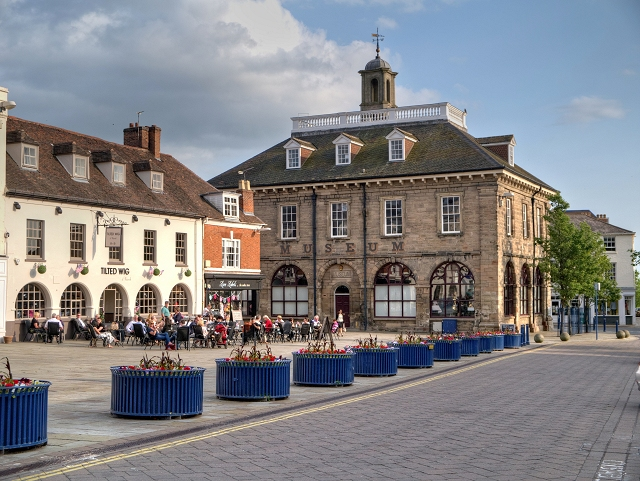
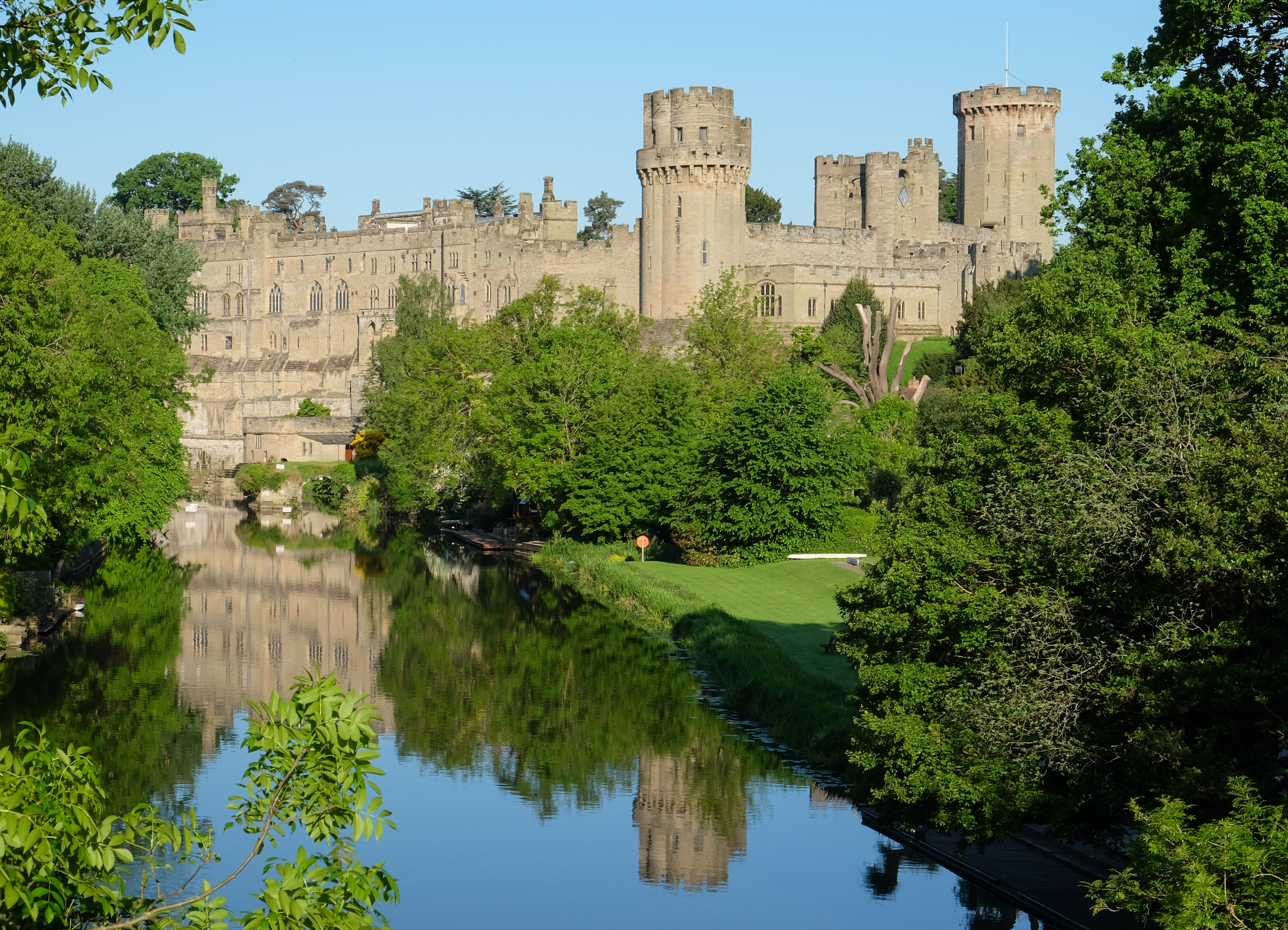
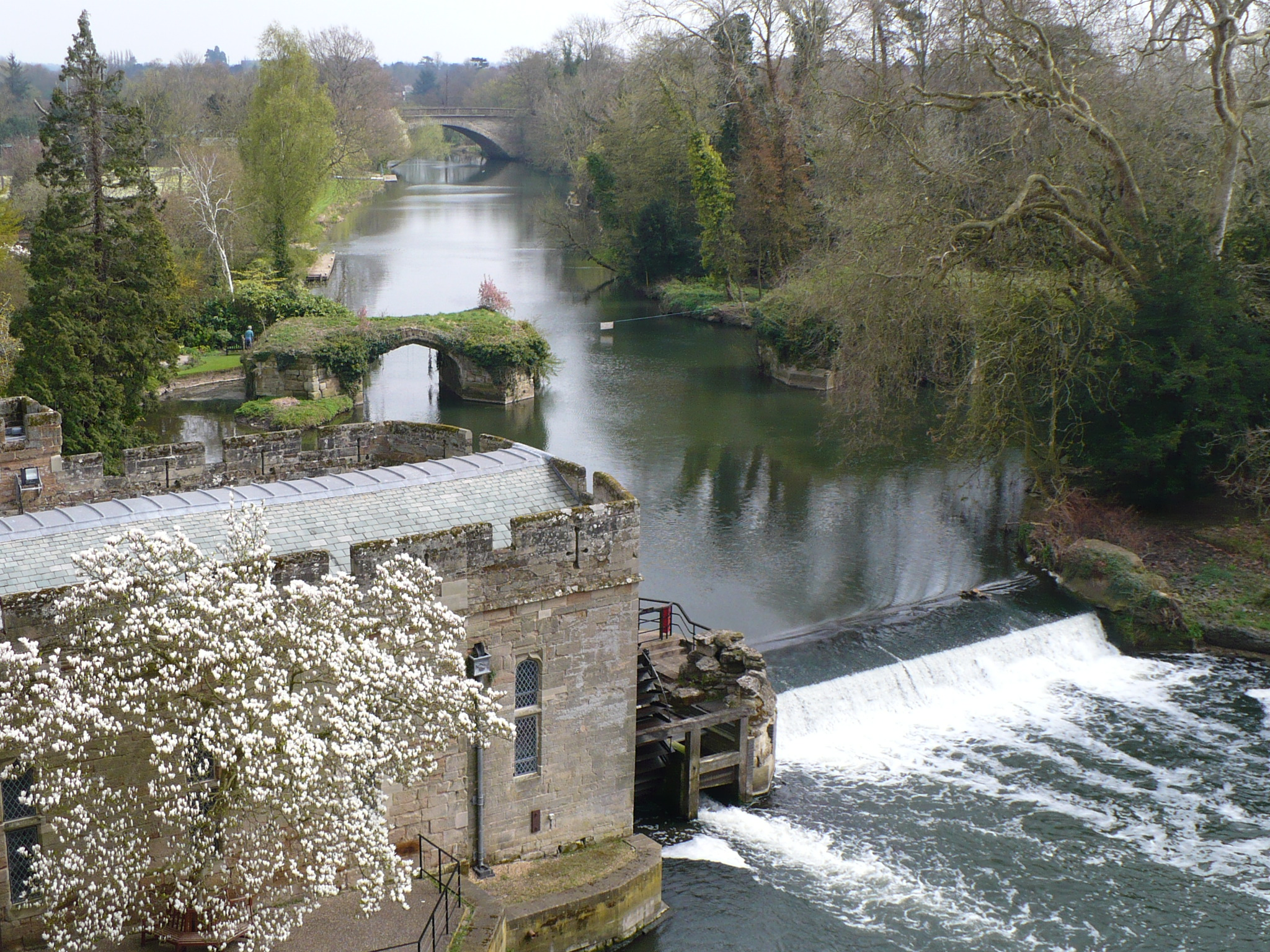
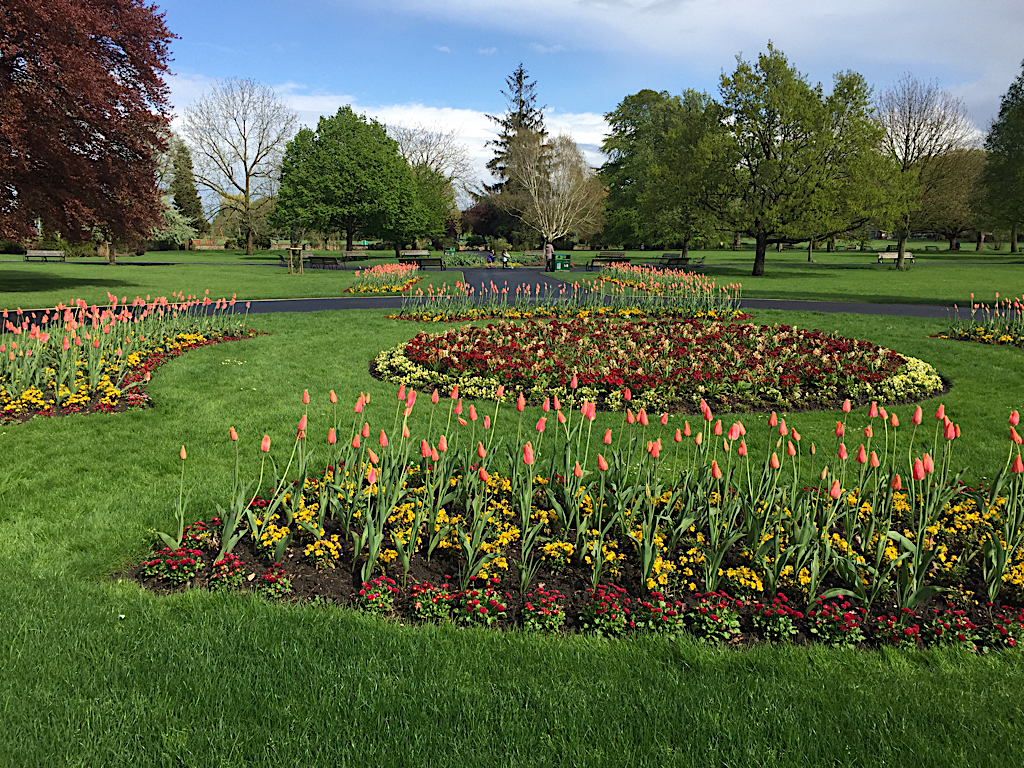
- The Parish Church and view of the town Market Place Warwick Castle River Avon St Nicholas Park

- Location within Warwickshire
- Area: 11.37 km^{2} (4.39 sq mi)
- Population: 36,665 (built-up area, 2021 Census)
  - Density: 3,225/km^{2} (8,350/sq mi)
- Demonym: Warwickian; Warwickestian
- OS grid reference: SP2865
  - London: 82 mi (132 km) SE
- Civil parish: Warwick
- District: Warwick
- Shire county: Warwickshire
- Region: West Midlands
- Country: England
- Sovereign state: United Kingdom
- Post town: WARWICK
- Postcode district: CV34, CV35
- Dialling code: 01926
- Police: Warwickshire
- Fire: Warwickshire
- Ambulance: West Midlands
- UK Parliament: Warwick and Leamington

Warwick (/ˈwɒrɪk/ WORR-ik) is a market town, civil parish and the county town of Warwickshire in the Warwick District in England, adjacent to the River Avon. It is 9 miles (14 km) south of Coventry, and 19 miles (31 km) south-east of Birmingham. It is adjoined with Leamington Spa and Whitnash.

Warwick has ancient origins and an array of historic buildings, notably from the Medieval, Stuart and Georgian eras. It was a major fortified settlement from the early Middle Ages, the most notable relic of this period being Warwick Castle, a major tourist attraction. Much was destroyed in the Great Fire of Warwick in 1694 and then rebuilt with fine 18th century buildings, such as the Collegiate Church of St Mary and the Shire Hall. The population was estimated at 36,665 at the 2021 Census.

== History ==
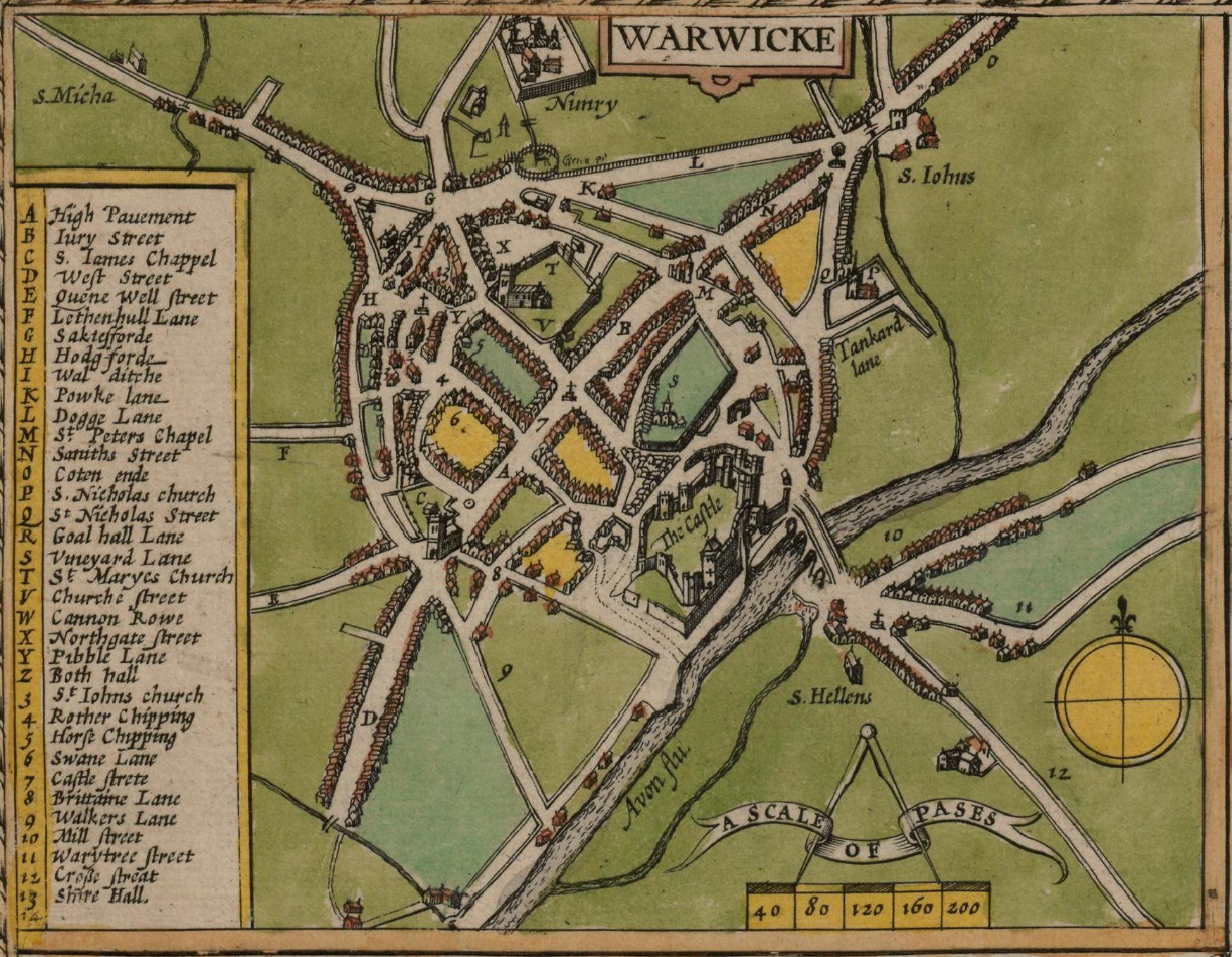
An old map of Warwick published around 1610 by John Speed; the castle is in the south of the town, next to the River Avon.

=== Neolithic ===
Human activity on the site dates back to the Neolithic, when it appears there was a sizable settlement on the Warwick hilltop. Artifacts found include more than 30 shallow pits containing early Neolithic flints and pottery and a number of small post holes indicating rectangular buildings. These are believed to have been created by Early European Farmers, sometime between 4000 and 2351 BC. An arrowhead from the Bell Beaker culture was likewise found, believed to date from 2500 to 1700 BC.

=== Roman ===
Archaeological work on the site of Warwick School in 2017–2018 revealed the footings of a sizeable Roman barn from the 2nd century AD. Roman rule in Britain begin to break down with the Great Conspiracy in 367–368, the withdrawal of Roman troops from Britain from 383 to 406 and the barbarian raids of 408.

=== Saxon ===
Warwick was continuously inhabited from the 5th century onwards. There are three alternative explanations for town's Old English name, Wæringwīc:

1. It may be composed of Wæring, which is a clan name or patronymic, and the suffix wīc, meaning a 'settlement characterised by extensive artisanal activity and trade';
2. Alternatively, it may be derived from wering, meaning a 'fortification'
3. Or it may reflect a 'weir,' the latter implying that the original settlement was located by a natural weir over the River Avon, possibly on the south side of the river, which offered easily cultivable land.

The Anglo-Saxon Chronicle for the year 914 reports that the Anglo-Saxon Æthelflæd, Lady of the Mercians, daughter of king Alfred the Great and sister of king Edward the Elder of Wessex, built a burh or fortified dwelling there on a hilltop site overlooking the earlier riverside settlement, as one of ten to defend Mercia from the Vikings. Warwick was chosen as a site for the burh because the local outcrop of sandstone alongside the Avon provided an easily defensible position at a strategic site by the river crossing, with a good source of water and building material.

In the early 10th century, a shire was founded with Warwick as its county town. During the reign of Æthelstan (924-939) a royal mint was established at Warwick. This was one of two established in Warwickshire at the time, the other being at Tamworth. The Warwick mint continued until the mid-12th century. In 1016 the Danes invaded Mercia and burned down much of Warwick including a nunnery, which stood on the site of today's St Nicholas Church.

=== Norman and medieval ===
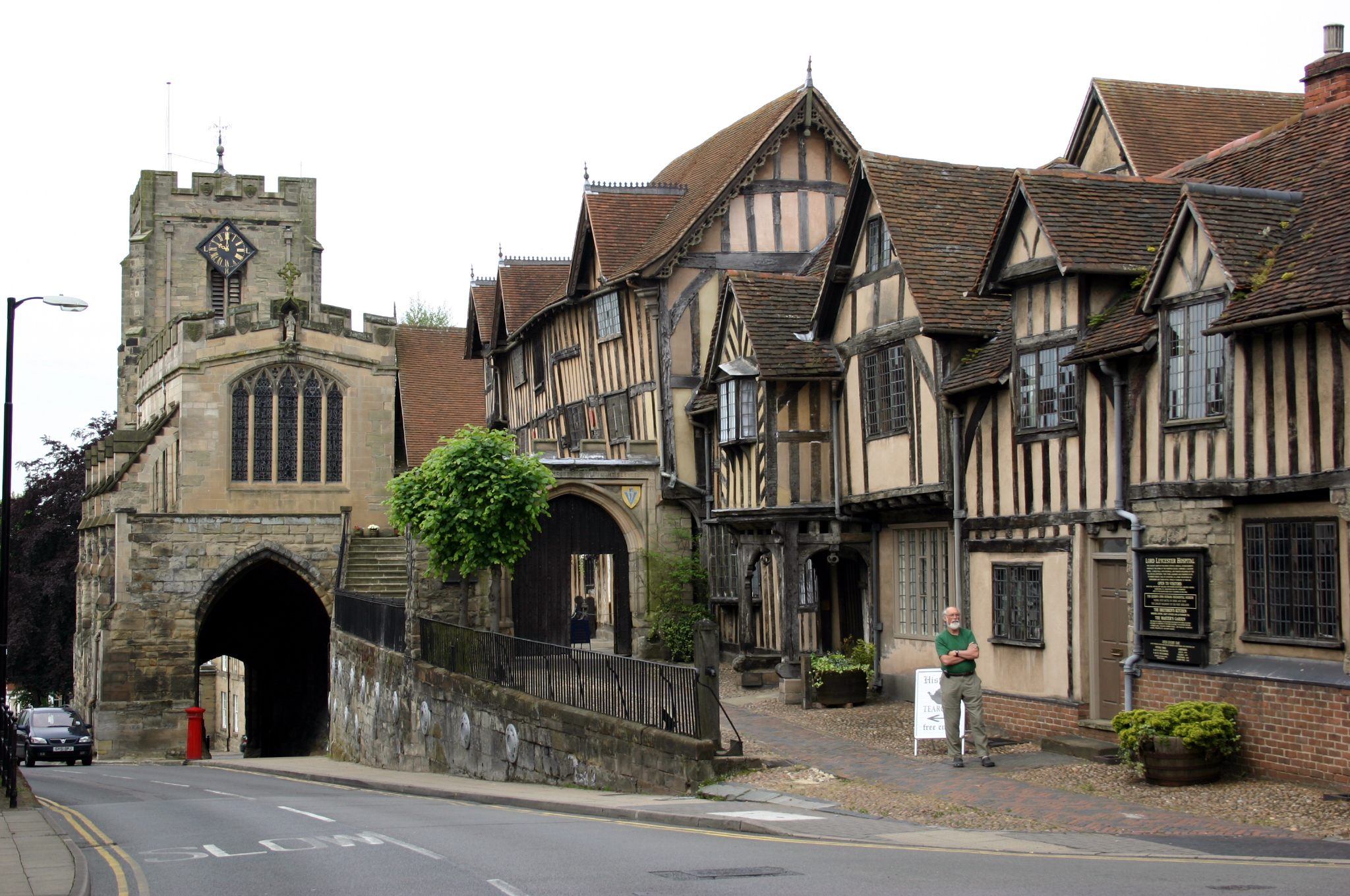
West Gate, and Lord Leycester Hospital, Warwick

William the Conqueror founded Warwick Castle in 1068, while on his way to Yorkshire to deal with rebellion in the north. Building it involved pulling down four houses. The castle stood within the larger Anglo-Saxon burh and a new town wall was created close to the burh ramparts.

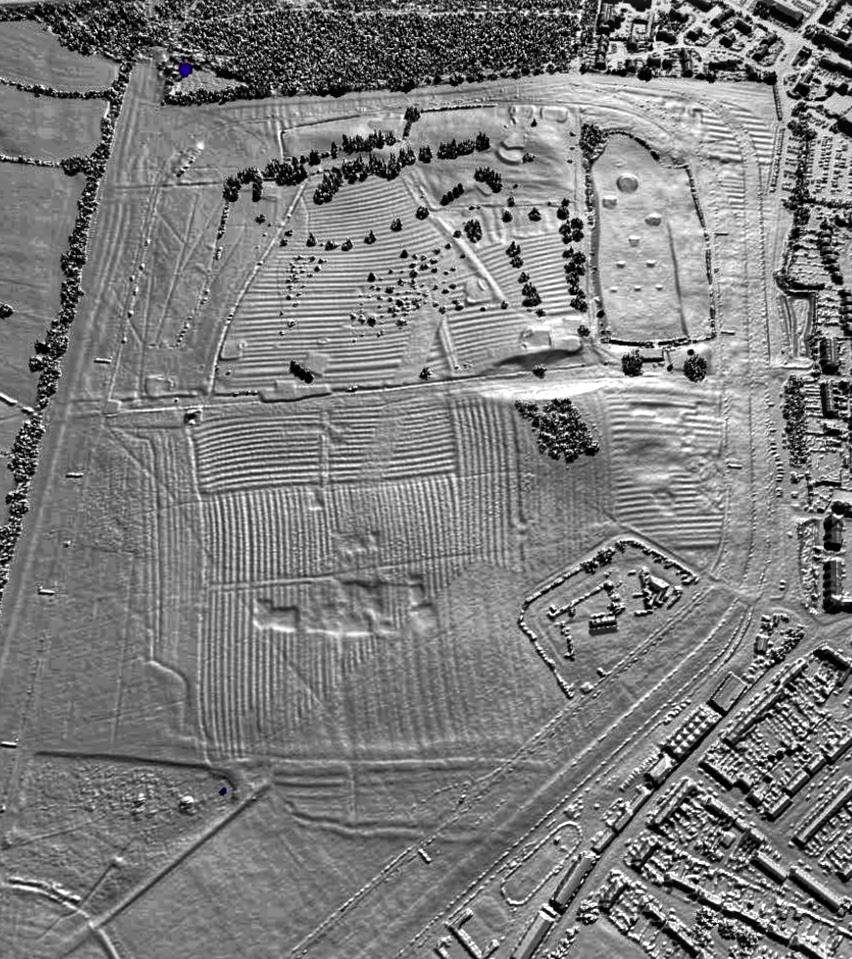
A lidar view of the site of a Deserted Medieval Settlement with ridge and furrow at Warwick Racecourse

The prosperity of medieval Warwick rested on its status as an administrative and military centre, however it was poorly positioned from the point of view of trade, and was consequently never a commercial or industrial centre of more than local significance in medieval times. Medieval Warwick was controlled by various Earls of Warwick, mostly of the Beauchamp family. It became a walled town. It is unknown quite when the town wall was built, but references to it are found as early as the 12th century. It had mostly been demolished by the early 16th century.

Today the only remains are the east and west gatehouses, there was previously also a north gatehouse, but this was demolished. On the south side, the bridge over the Avon was said to fulfil the role of a gatehouse, and likely had a barrier. The west gate was first recorded in 1129, and had a chapel of St James above it, which was reconstructed in the 14th century and extensively restored in 1863–1865. The east gate was rebuilt in the 15th century with the Chapel of St Peter above it. It was rebuilt again in 1788 and was once used as part of The King's High School, but is now a holiday home.

The town's Priory was founded in around 1119 by Henry de Beaumont, the first Earl of Warwick. It was later destroyed during the Dissolution of the Monasteries in 1536, it stood on the site of the current Priory Park. Henry de Beaumont also founded the Hospital of St John near the east town gate. It is now the site of the 17th century St John's House. Relatively few medieval buildings survive in Warwick, however one of the most notable examples is the Lord Leycester Hospital on the High Street, whose oldest parts date from 1383. Warwick was not incorporated as a borough until 1545.

=== 17th century ===
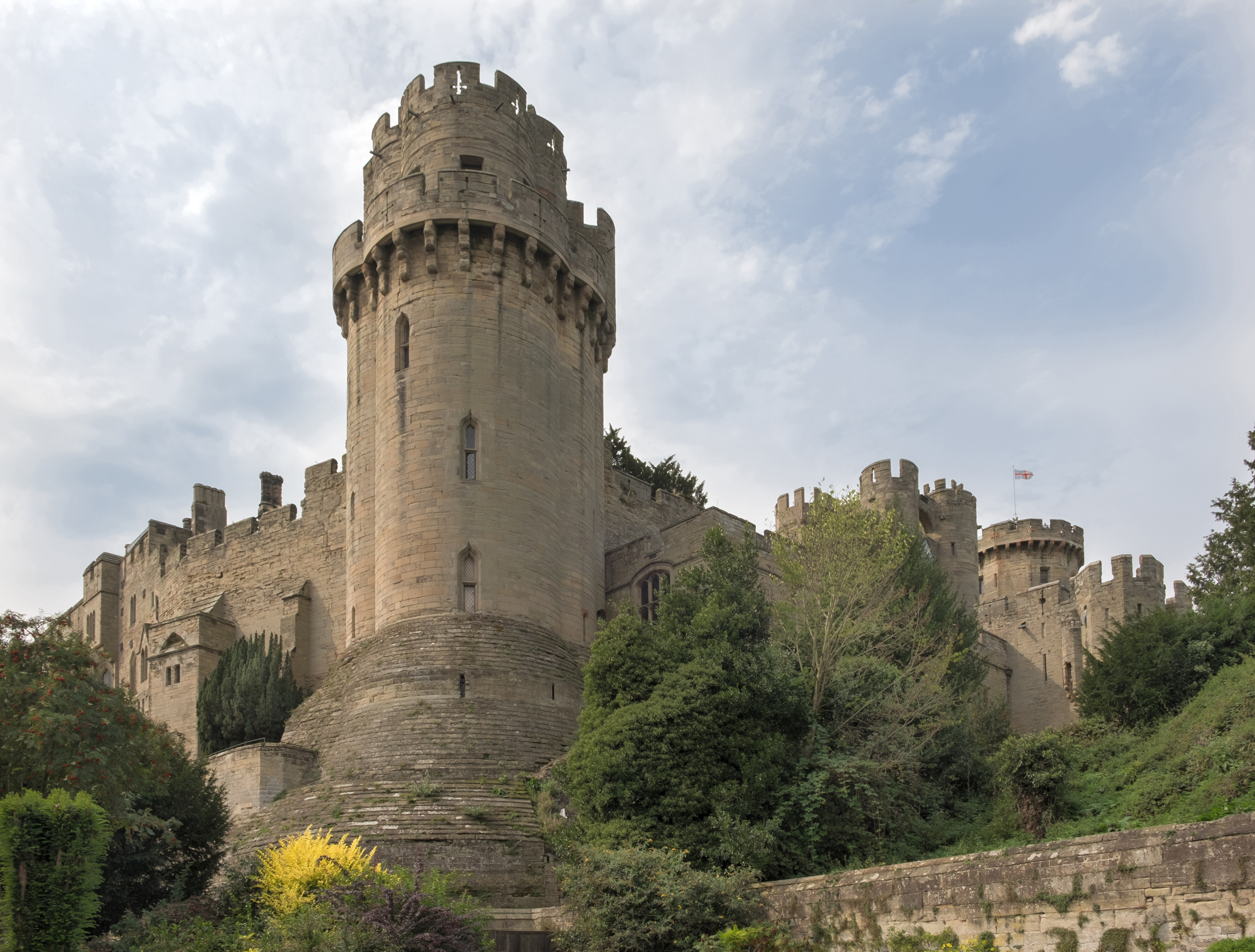
Warwick Castle

During the English Civil War, the town and castle were garrisoned for Parliament under Sir Edward Peyto. In 1642 the castle underwent a two-week siege by the Royalists commanded by the Earl of Northampton, however, the besiegers lacked any cannons powerful enough to damage the castle. The siege collapsed when, on hearing of the approach of the Earl of Essex to Southam, Lord Northampton marched his force away towards Worcester. Major John Bridges was appointed governor of the castle in 1643, and a garrison was maintained there with artillery and other stores until 1659, which at its height in 1645 consisted of 302 soldiers.

The mid-17th century saw the founding of Castle Hill Baptist Church, one of the oldest Baptist churches in the world.

==== Great fire of Warwick ====
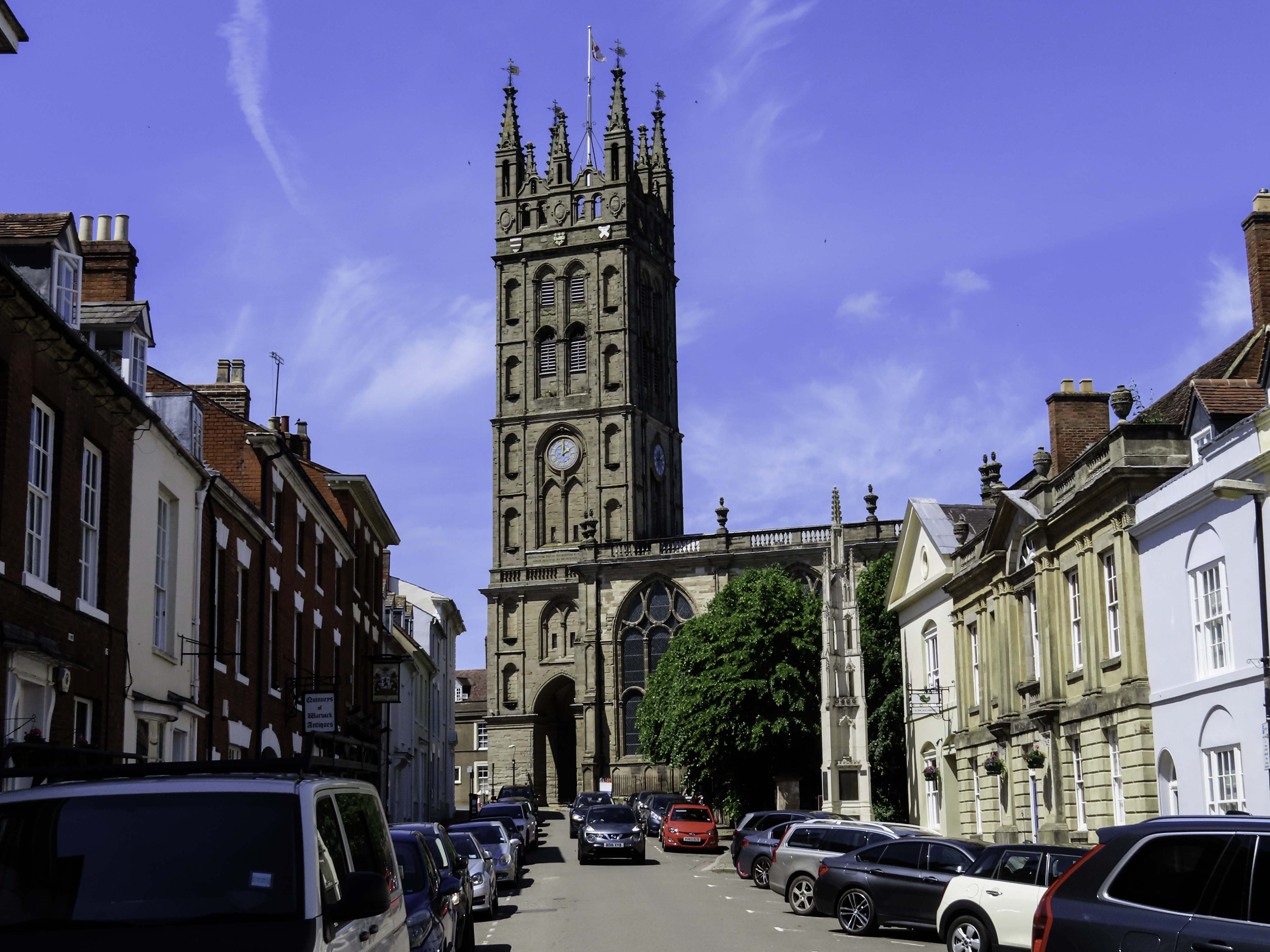
Collegiate Church of St Mary from Church Street, an example of the 18th century rebuilding of Warwick

Much of the medieval town centre was destroyed in the Great Fire of Warwick on 5 September 1694, which, within five hours destroyed 460 buildings and left 250 families homeless. Thus most of the town-centre buildings are of late 17th and early 18th-century origin, although some medieval timber-framed buildings survive, especially around the edges of the town centre.

One of the aims of the rebuilding of Warwick following the fire, was to encourage the gentry and professional men to settle in the town, and so impetus was given to rebuilding the town in the then contemporary Georgian style. Many of the buildings in the rebuilt town were designed by the architects Francis Smith, and later William and David Hiorne, who gave Warwick its 18th century appearance. Daniel Defoe gave his opinion that Warwick had been 'rebuilt in so noble and so beautiful a manner that few towns in England make so fine an appearance'.

The fire burnt down much of the medieval church of St Mary. However, the chancel and the Beauchamp Chapel survived, the latter having been built between 1443 and 1464 according to the wishes of Richard Beauchamp, Earl of Warwick, who had died in Rouen in 1439. A full-size reclining copper-gilt effigy of him lies on his Purbeck marble tomb – a fine piece of medieval metalwork cast in 1459.

=== 18th century to present ===
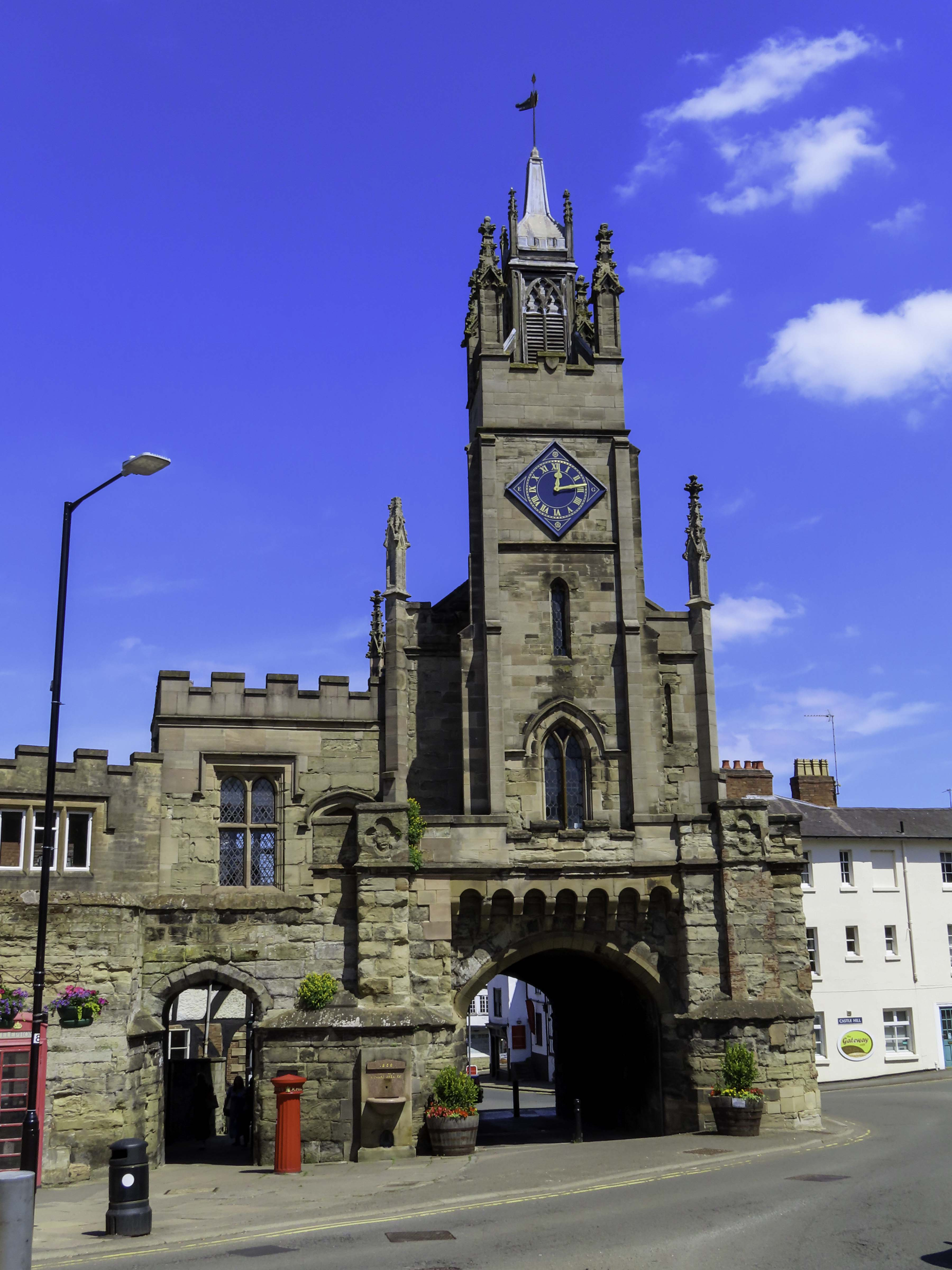
The Eastgate, Warwick

In 1788 the Earl of Warwick obtained an Act of Parliament to enable him to build a new bridge over the Avon: Castle Bridge, which consists of a single sandstone arch was opened in 1793. It replaced an older 14th century bridge further downstream, known as Old Castle Bridge, which fell into ruin, although remains of it can still be seen. The Warwick and Birmingham and Warwick and Napton canals were both opened through Warwick in 1800. They now form parts of the Grand Union Canal.

The Borough of Warwick was reformed under the Municipal Corporations Act 1835, which reconstituted it as a municipal borough with an elected Town Council.

The railway arrived in Warwick in 1852 when the Great Western Railway opened its man line between Birmingham, Oxford and London through the town, along with Warwick railway station. However, the train service proved to be a disappointment to Warwick, as no express trains served the town, stopping at nearby Leamington Spa railway station instead. Warwick was largely bypassed by the Industrial Revolution; during the early 19th century, only minor industrial activities developed in the town, such as hat making. By the early 20th century, some engineering industry had been established locally.

The Warwick Pageant was a major festival in the grounds of Warwick Castle in 1906, organised by Louis N. Parker from a house in Jury Street. As Pageant House, this subsequently served as the offices of Warwick Borough Council, until the enlarged Warwick District Council was formed in Leamington Spa in 1974.

The Leamington & Warwick Tramways & Omnibus Company was established in 1881, and operated a tramway service between Warwick and Leamington Spa until 1930. It ran across Portobello Bridge, a three-arch bridge built 1831 to connect the two towns.

In 2021 it was announced that Warwick had entered a competition with 38 other contenders to be awarded city status as part of the Platinum Jubilee Civic Honours. However, it was not among the eight winners ultimately chosen in May 2022.

=== Population change ===
Populations before the 1801 census can be based on indirect measures. Historians suggest that Warwick had a population of about 1,500 in 1086. Indicators for ensuing centuries are sparse; however, by the mid-16th century, it is thought to have been about 2,000, which increased by the late 17th century to over 3,000. At the time of the first national census in 1801, Warwick had 5,592 inhabitants. This population nearly doubled by 1851, when it reached 10,952; thereafter, growth was slower for more than a century, reaching 15,349 in 1951 and 16,051 in 1961. Since then it has almost doubled, to 31,315 in 2011.

== Governance ==
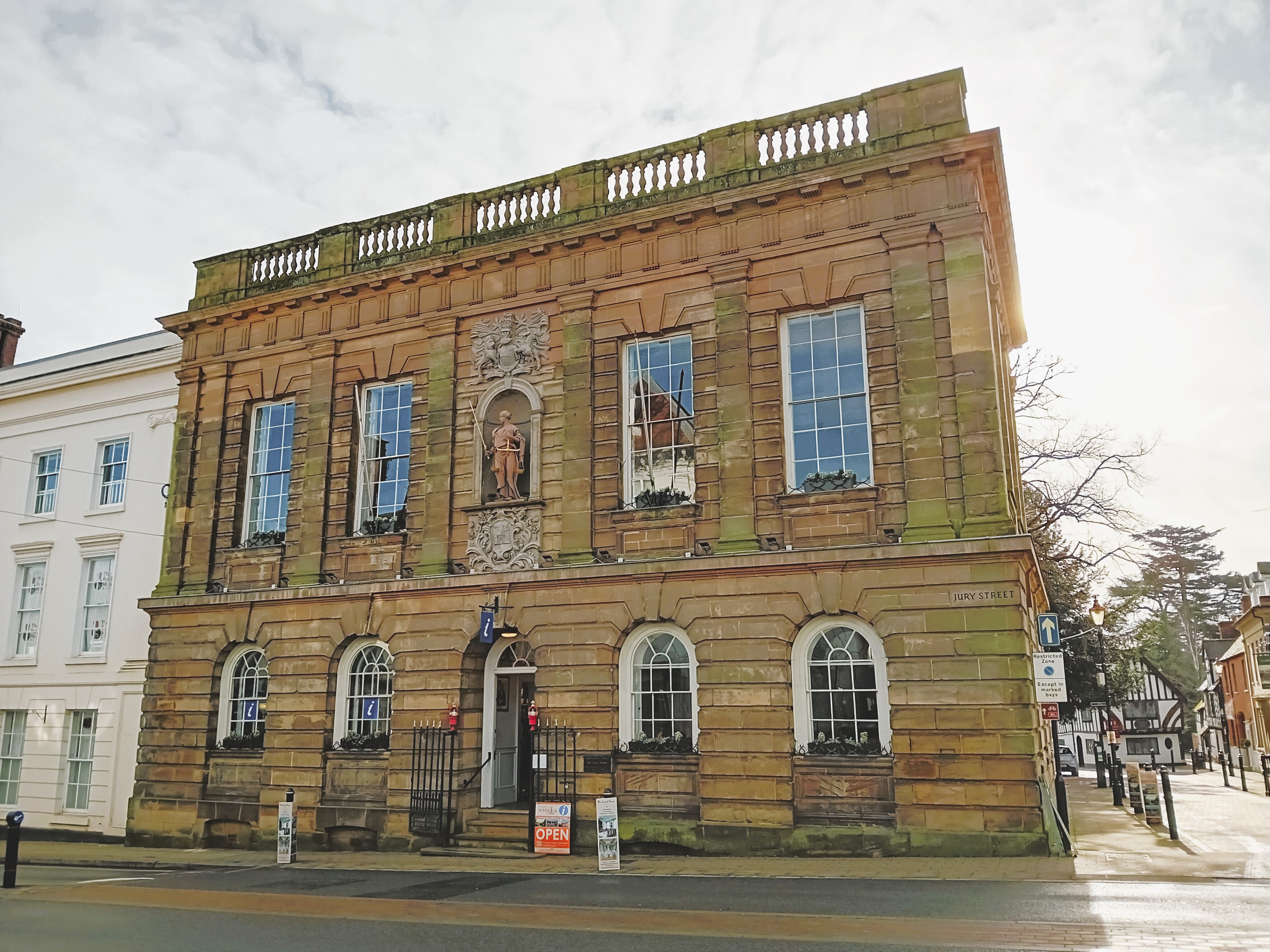
The Court House: Headquarters of Warwick Town Council

There are three tiers of local government covering Warwick, at parish (town), district, and county level: Warwick Town Council, Warwick District Council and Warwickshire County Council. The town council is based at the Court House on Jury Street, which was completed in 1731. The district council, although taking its name from Warwick, is based in the neighbouring town of Leamington Spa. Warwickshire County Council has its headquarters at Shire Hall, a complex of buildings between Market Place and Northgate Street in the centre of Warwick.

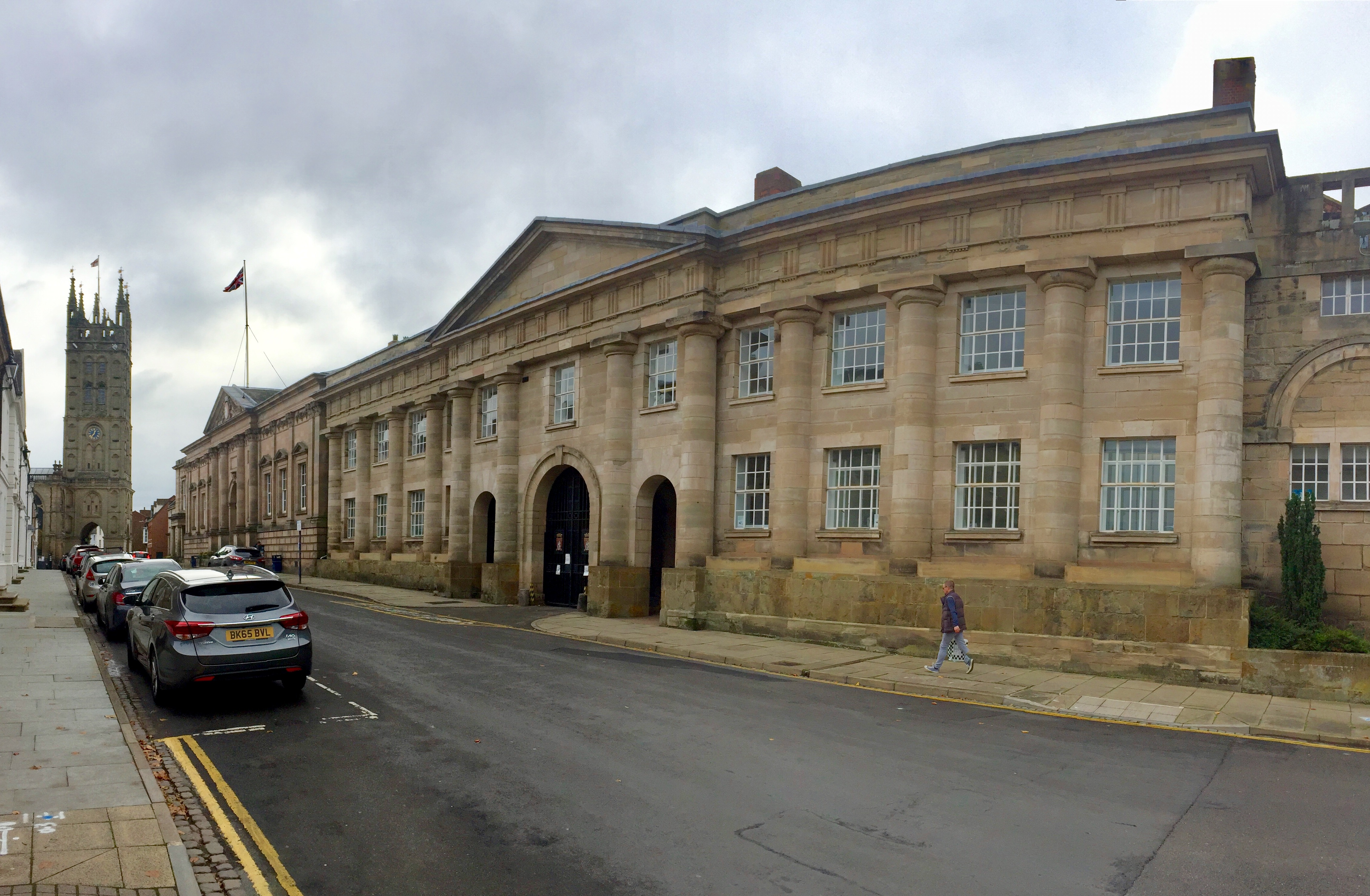
Shire Hall, Warwick, the meeting place of Warwickshire County Council

Population growth has led to Warwick adjoining its larger and younger neighbour Leamington Spa and also Whitnash as part of a conurbation of some 95,000 inhabitants.

The Warwick District, as well as the county council will be abolished in 2028 as part of the 2027–28 local government reforms, and replaced with a new unitary authority of South Warwickshire, which will comprise the areas of the existing Warwick and Stratford-on-Avon districts.

Warwick is represented in Parliament as part of the Warwick and Leamington constituency, the seat from 1923 to 1957 of Anthony Eden, who was Britain's Prime Minister from 1955 to 1957. It has been held by the Labour Party since the 2017 general election, when Matt Western was elected as the constituency's MP. From the 1945 general election until 1997, the constituency elected a Conservative MP. In the 1997 general election, a Labour MP was elected; he held the seat until 2010, when Chris White was elected for the Conservatives. White lost his seat when Theresa May called a snap election in 2017.

== Geography ==
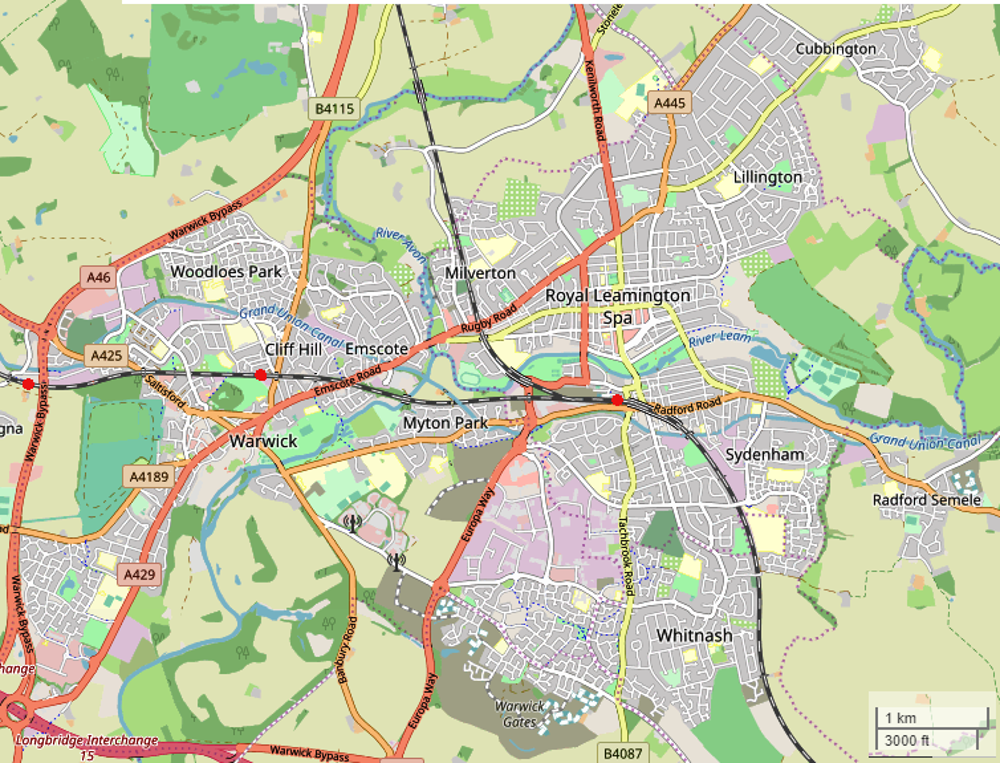
Map of Warwick, Leamington and Whitnash

The 17th-century antiquarian William Dugdale wrote that Warwick was "standing upon a rocky ascent from every side, and in a dry and fertile soil, having... rich and pleasant meadows on the south part... and... woodland on the north." Two factors have affected Warwick's built environment: the Great Fire of 1694 and the lack of industrialisation. In the 19th century, the widespread industrialisation of England largely passed Warwick by. One reason was that the town did not lie on important roads and the River Avon was not navigable as far as Warwick.

=== Suburbs ===
Suburbs of Warwick include Bridge End, Cliff Hill, Emscote, Woodloes Park, Forbes, Myton (connecting Warwick with Leamington Spa), Packmores, The Cape, The Percy, Warwick Gates, Chase Meadow and Myton Green. Warwick Gates is a housing estate and business park in Heathcote, south-east Warwick, which was built in the late 1990s. Although separated from Warwick town centre by open fields, Warwick Gates falls within the Warwick South and Bishops Tachbrook parish.

It is adjacent to Whitnash, a small town near Leamington Spa, and the village of Bishops Tachbrook. The Tachbrook Park and Heathcote industrial estates are also nearby. The NHS Leamington Spa Hospital is adjacent to Warwick Gates. In the early 2010s another new estate, Chase Meadow, was built to the south-west of the town next to Warwick Racecourse. Its amenities include a public house, a Chinese takeaway and a fish and chip shop. Ten year later a new estate south of Myton, named Myton Green was built.

=== Climate ===
Warwick experiences the usual English maritime climate, marked by a narrow temperature range, mild winters and cool summers. The nearest official Met Office weather station is at Wellesbourne, about 6 miles (10 km) south of the town centre and at a similar elevation. The absolute maximum temperature (also the absolute maximum for the county of Warwickshire) stands at 36.1 °C (97.0 °F) recorded in August 1990. During a typical year, the warmest day should reach 30.0 °C (86.0 °F), and 16.5 days should report a maximum of 25.1 °C (77.2 °F) or higher. The lowest recorded temperature is −17.8 °C (0.0 °F), recorded in January 1982. Typically, 53.3 air frosts are recorded in an "average" year. Rainfall averages out at 608 millimetres (23.9 in) per year, with over 114 days seeing 1 mm (0.04 in) or more falling. All averages refer to the 1971–2000 period.

Climate data for Wellesbourne, elevation 47 m (154 ft), 1971–2000, extremes 1960–
Month	Jan	Feb	Mar	Apr	May	Jun	Jul	Aug	Sep	Oct	Nov	Dec	Year
Record high °C (°F)	14.5 (58.1)	17.8 (64.0)	21.7 (71.1)	26.3 (79.3)	28.1 (82.6)	32.8 (91.0)	35.4 (95.7)	36.1 (97.0)	28.9 (84.0)	23.9 (75.0)	18.8 (65.8)	15.6 (60.1)	36.1 (97.0)
Mean daily maximum °C (°F)	7.0 (44.6)	7.5 (45.5)	10.2 (50.4)	12.8 (55.0)	16.5 (61.7)	19.4 (66.9)	22.4 (72.3)	21.9 (71.4)	18.4 (65.1)	14.1 (57.4)	9.8 (49.6)	7.7 (45.9)	14.0 (57.2)
Mean daily minimum °C (°F)	0.9 (33.6)	0.8 (33.4)	2.4 (36.3)	3.6 (38.5)	6.2 (43.2)	9.1 (48.4)	11.3 (52.3)	11.2 (52.2)	9.3 (48.7)	6.5 (43.7)	3.2 (37.8)	1.7 (35.1)	5.5 (41.9)
Record low °C (°F)	−17.8 (0.0)	−14.5 (5.9)	−10 (14)	−6.6 (20.1)	−2.8 (27.0)	−1.7 (28.9)	2.2 (36.0)	1.7 (35.1)	−2.2 (28.0)	−5.7 (21.7)	−8.5 (16.7)	−17.4 (0.7)	−17.8 (0.0)
Average precipitation mm (inches)	53.84 (2.12)	39.86 (1.57)	45.27 (1.78)	44.86 (1.77)	49.3 (1.94)	53.57 (2.11)	44.75 (1.76)	56.32 (2.22)	57.58 (2.27)	54.97 (2.16)	50.18 (1.98)	57.77 (2.27)	608.46 (23.96)
Source: KNMI

== Demographics ==
At the 2011 census, there were 31,345 residents in Warwick in 14,226 households, and the median age of Warwick residents was 39. In terms of ethnicity:

- 88.1% of Warwick residents were White British (Comprising 84.1% White British, 2.9% Other White, and 1.1% Irish)
- 7.9% were Asian (Comprising 5.4% Indian, 0.8% Chinese, 0.4% Pakistani, 0.1% Bangladeshi and 1.2% from another Asian background)
- 0.7% were Black (Comprising 0.4% African, 0.3% Caribbean and 0.1% other Black)
- 2.2% were Mixed
- 0.2% were Arab, and 0.9% were from another ethnic group.

In terms of religion, 58.0% of Warwick residents identified as Christian, 26.9% said they had no religion, 7.4% did not state any religion, 4.6% were Sikh, 1.3% were Hindu, 1.0% were Muslim, 0.4% were Buddhists, 0.2% were Jewish and 0.4% were from another religion.

== Economy ==
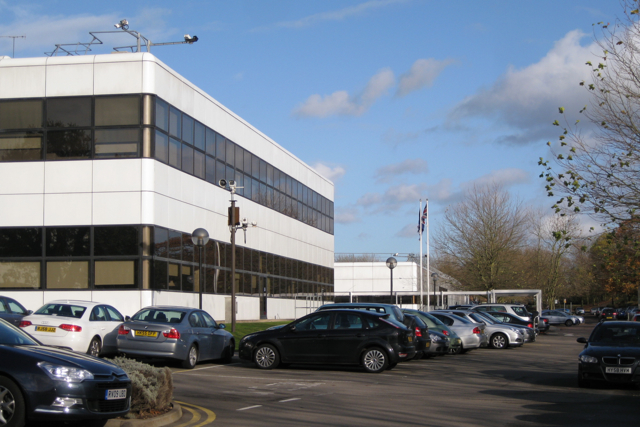
IBM at Warwick

Due to its proximity to north–south and east–west motorway routes, many companies have a head office in the town. Since November 2004, National Grid UK has had its United Kingdom headquarters on the Warwick Technology Park south of the town near the A452 road. Phillips 66 and their petrol station group, JET, have an office on the Technology Park. Other businesses with head offices here include lingerie company Bravissimo. IBM, Wolseley UK and Volvo Group UK have bases on the Wedgnock Industrial Estate in the north of the town, near to the A46 trunk road. Other companies with regional headquarters in Warwick include Bridgestone, Calor Gas, Kantar and Delphi Automotive. In recent years several high-profile national and international companies have set up large office complexes in and around Warwick, notably National Grid and IBM. There is also an out-of-town retail park called Leamington Shopping Park (formerly The Shires Retail Park).

== Culture ==
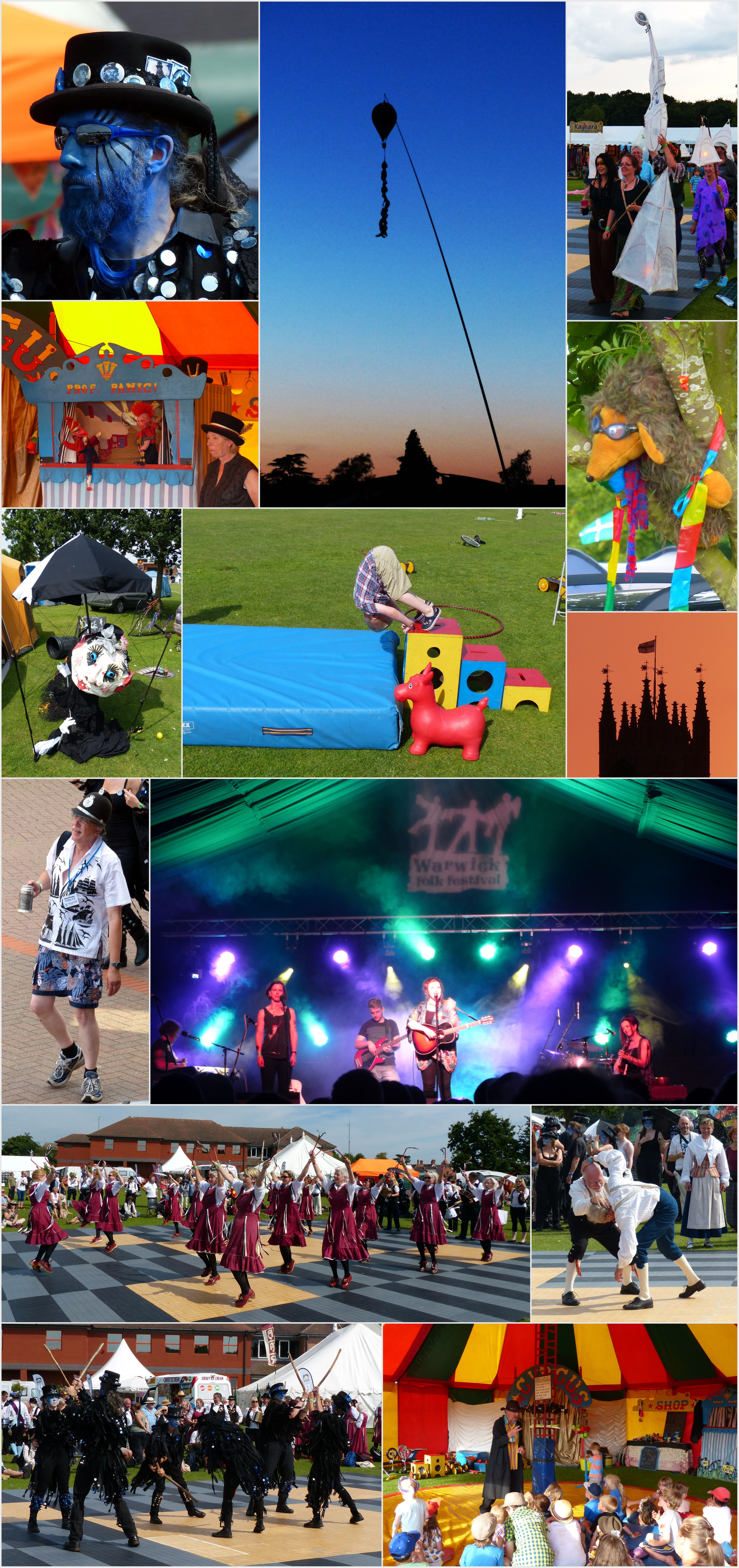
Warwick Folk Festival Montage, 2014

Warwick hosts several annual festivals, including: the spoken word; classical and contemporary music; a folk festival; and a Victorian Evening, held in late November or early December. St. Mary's Church hosts a series of Early Music concerts, and the Bridge House Theatre hosts the Music-in-Round concerts. Warwick Chamber of Trade helps to promote the town for visitors, residents and businesses. The town is also famous for Warwick Castle, whose construction began in 1068. The town centre is also known for its mixture of Tudor and 17th-century buildings.

Warwick is also known for Warwick Racecourse, near the west gate of the medieval town, which hosts several televised horse racing meetings a year. Within the racecourse is a small golf course. J. R. R. Tolkien seems to have been very influenced by Warwick (where he was married in the Catholic Church of Saint Mary Immaculate and is commemorated by a blue plaque) and by its Mercian connections: Lynn Forest-Hill, in an article in the Times Literary Supplement (TLS 8 July 2005 pp 12–13) argues cogently that two important settlements in Tolkien's work were modelled on Warwick – Edoras closely on the early town, and Minas Tirith more remotely on the Norman; and that aspects of the plot of The Lord of the Rings are paralleled in the romance known as Guy of Warwick. Christopher Tolkien, in The Book of Lost Tales, stated that Kortirion, the main city of Tol Eressëa, "would become in after days Warwick."

Warwick and its historic buildings have featured in a number of television series, including the BBC's drama series Dangerfield, the period dramas Pride and Prejudice and Tom Jones and Granada Television's Moll Flanders. Parts of the town substituted for Elizabethan and Jacobean era London in the third-series episode two ("The Shakespeare Code") of Doctor Who which ran 7 April 2007. Filming took place in June 2019 for A Christmas Carol, which was screened on United Kingdom television at Christmas 2019.

=== Museums ===
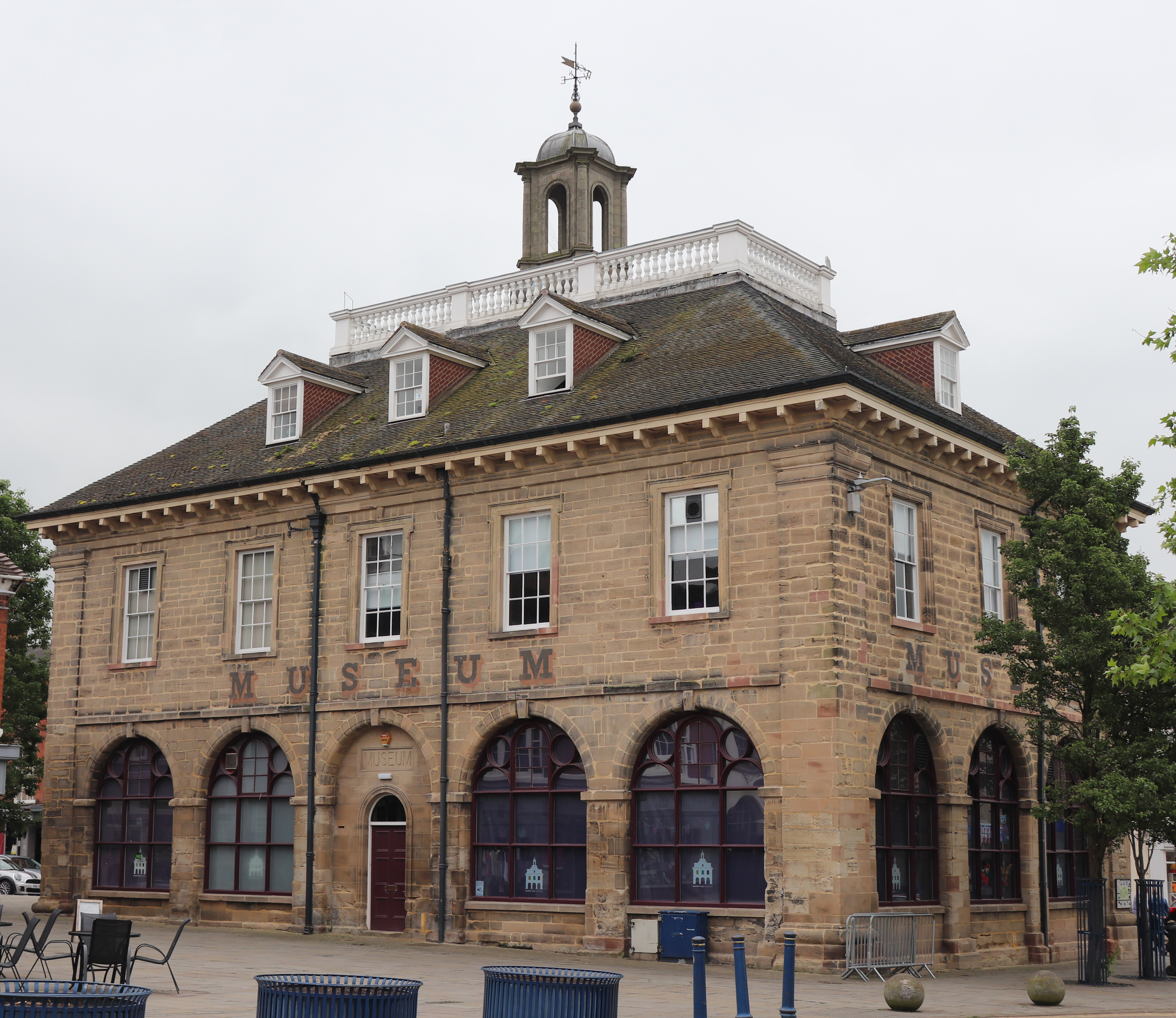
Market Hall museum, in the Market Square

The Warwickshire Museum has two sites in Warwick, firstly the historic 17th century Market Hall in the Market Square, which hosts collections which are primarily focused on objects in the fields of archaeology, geology and natural history, and particularly those local to Warwickshire. Secondly, the 17th century St John's House, which hosts, among other things, a full sized replica of a Victorian kitchen and classroom, and the Royal Warwickshire Regiment of Fusiliers Museum.

=== Local media ===
Local news and television programmes are provided by BBC West Midlands and ITV Central. Television signals are received from the Lark Stoke TV transmitter and the local relay transmitter in Leamington Spa.

Warwick's local radio stations are BBC CWR on 103.7 FM, Capital Mid-Counties on 107.3 FM, Hits Radio Coventry & Warwickshire on 102.9 FM and Fresh (Coventry & Warwickshire), DAB radio station.

Local newspapers are the Warwickshire Telegraph and The Boar, a student newspaper for the University of Warwick.

== Hospitals ==
Warwick Hospital, Leamington Spa Hospital and St Michael's Hospital (a psychiatric unit that superseded Central Hospital) are in the town.

== Sport ==
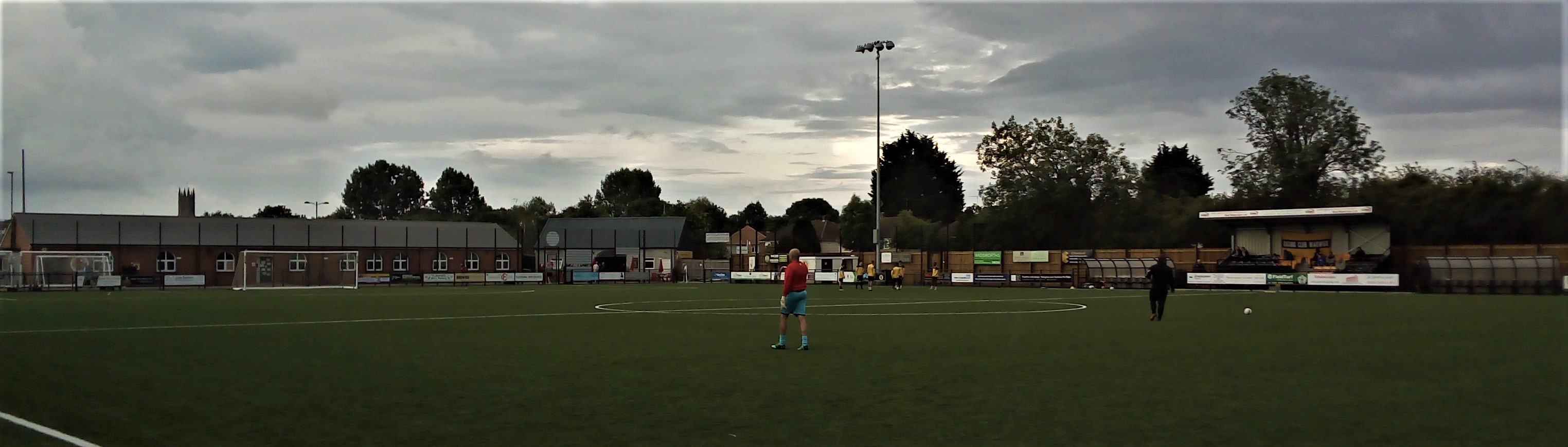
A panorama of the club from 2021

Warwick Racecourse is located just west of the town centre. Adjacent to it is Racing Club Warwick F.C., founded in 1919. The city has many long-established sports clubs, including Warwick Hockey Club, founded in 1920.

== Education ==
=== Schools ===
Secondary schools in Warwick include Warwick School, an independent day and boarding school for boys. The King's High School For Girls is also independent, but Myton School and Aylesford School are state-run co-educational schools. Campion School and Trinity Catholic School in Leamington include parts of Warwick in their catchment areas. Warwick Preparatory School is an independent day school and nursery for boys aged 3–7 and girls 3–11. It is part of the Warwick Independent Schools Foundation, together with King's High School and Warwick School.

=== Warwick School ===
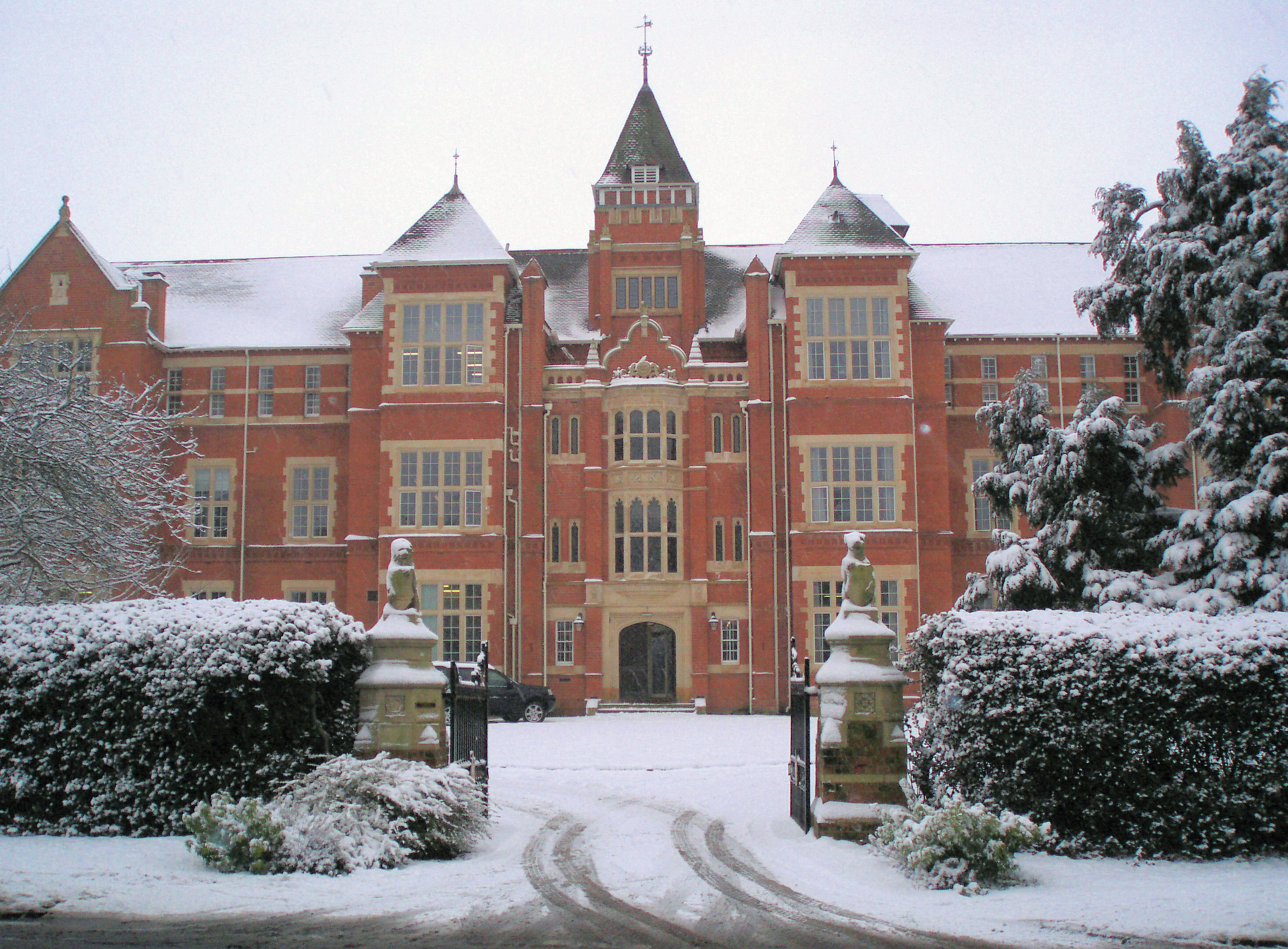
The 1879 facade of the school

Warwick School is an independent school for boys which claims to be the oldest boys' school in England. The actual foundation date is unknown, although 914 has sometimes been quoted. For some years the school claimed that King Edward the Confessor (c. 1004–1066) chartered it, although there is no clear evidence for this and King Henry VIII re-founded it in 1545. Whatever the case, there has undoubtedly been a grammar school in the town of Warwick since before the Norman Conquest. Its present successor has occupied its current site south of the River Avon since 1879.

=== University of Warwick ===
The nearest university is the University of Warwick, which is named after the county of Warwickshire, rather than the town, and is in fact situated several miles north of Warwick on the southern outskirts of Coventry.

== Landmarks and notable buildings ==
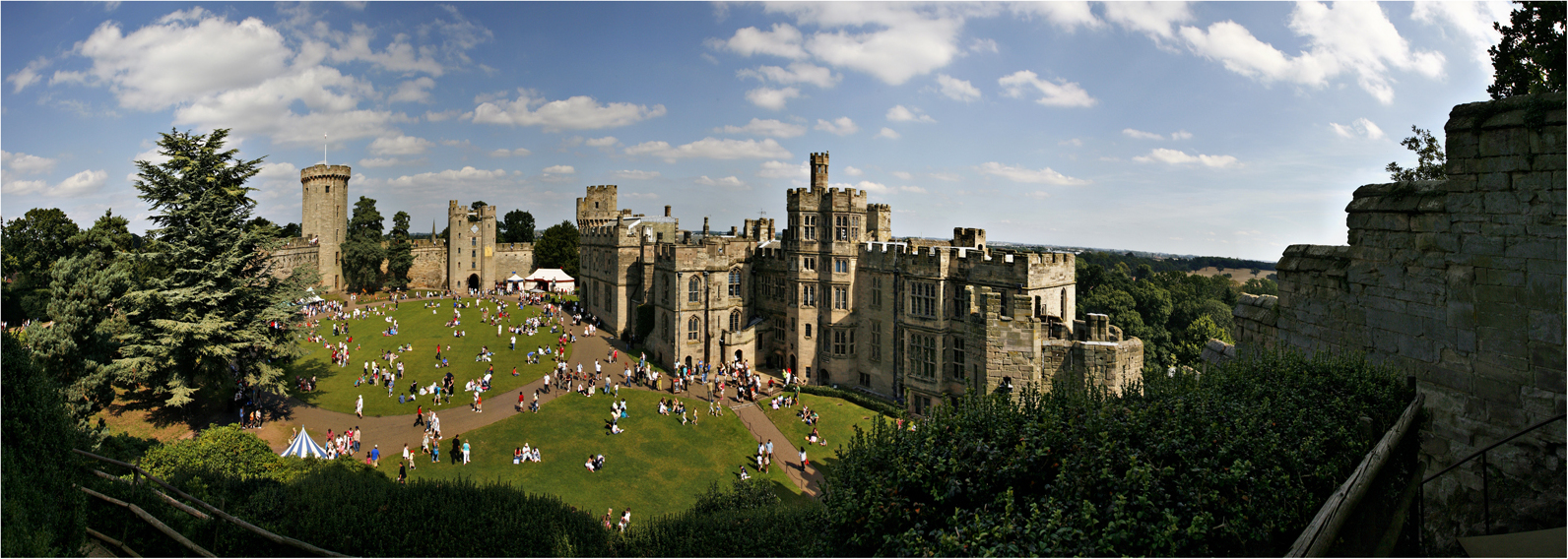
Warwick Castle

- Collegiate Church of St Mary
- Gurdwara Sahib Leamington and Warwick
- Guy's Cliffe House
- Lord Leycester Hospital
- Lord Leycester Hotel
- Market Hall
- Market Square
- The Dream Factory
- St John's Museum
- St Michael's Leper Hospital
- St. Nicholas' Park
- St Paul's Church, Warwick
- Saxon Mill
- Shire Hall
- Warwick Castle
- Warwick Hospital
- Warwick Racecourse
- Warwick School
- Hill Close Gardens
- St Mary Immaculate Roman Catholic Church

== Transport ==
=== Road ===
Warwick is on the M40 London-Birmingham motorway, connected to junctions 13, 14 and 15; it is also on the A46 dual-carriageway trunk road positioned between Coventry and Stratford-upon-Avon. Warwick has several council off-street car parks in the town. There are also a few privately run car parks, including those at the railway station and the castle.

=== Rail ===
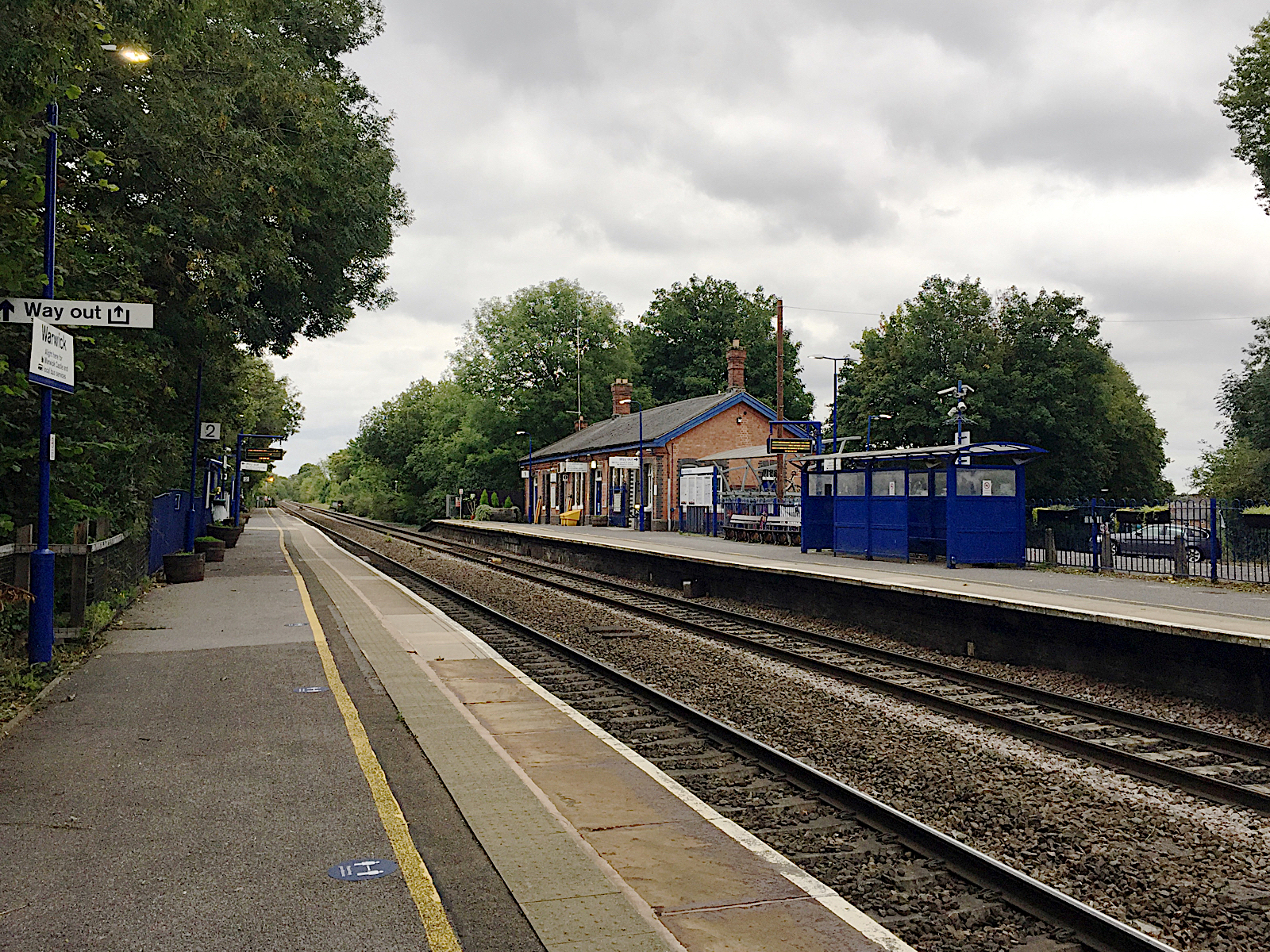
Warwick railway station

The town has two railway stations, both on the Chiltern Main Line: Located a short distance north of the town centre is Warwick railway station, which has direct rail services to Leamington Spa, London, Birmingham and Stratford-upon-Avon; these services are provided by Chiltern Railways. In addition, a few peak-hour trains to and from Birmingham are operated by West Midlands Trains. The second station is Warwick Parkway, an out-of-town station opened in 2000 on the western outskirts of the town, this provides frequent services to London and Birmingham. Historically, the Leamington & Warwick Tramways & Omnibus Company operated between the towns from 1881 to 1930.

=== Bus and coach ===
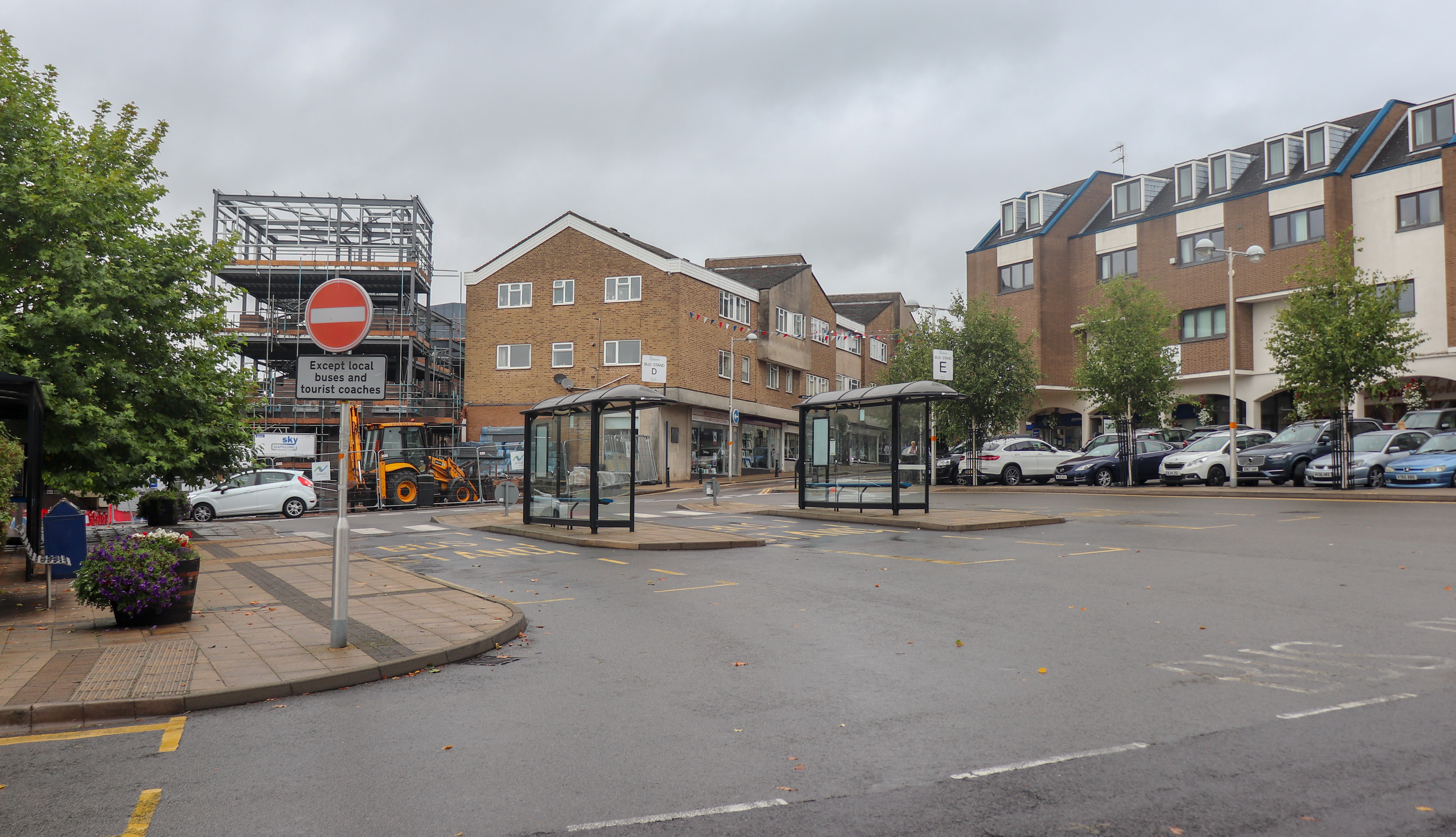
Warwick bus station near the Lord Leycester Hospital

Bus services to Leamington Spa, Stratford-upon-Avon and Coventry are operated by Stagecoach in Warwickshire from the bus station in the town centre. There is also a National Express coach stop in the town's bus station with limited services. The nearby Warwick Parkway railway station also has a coach stop with more frequent services.

=== Waterways ===
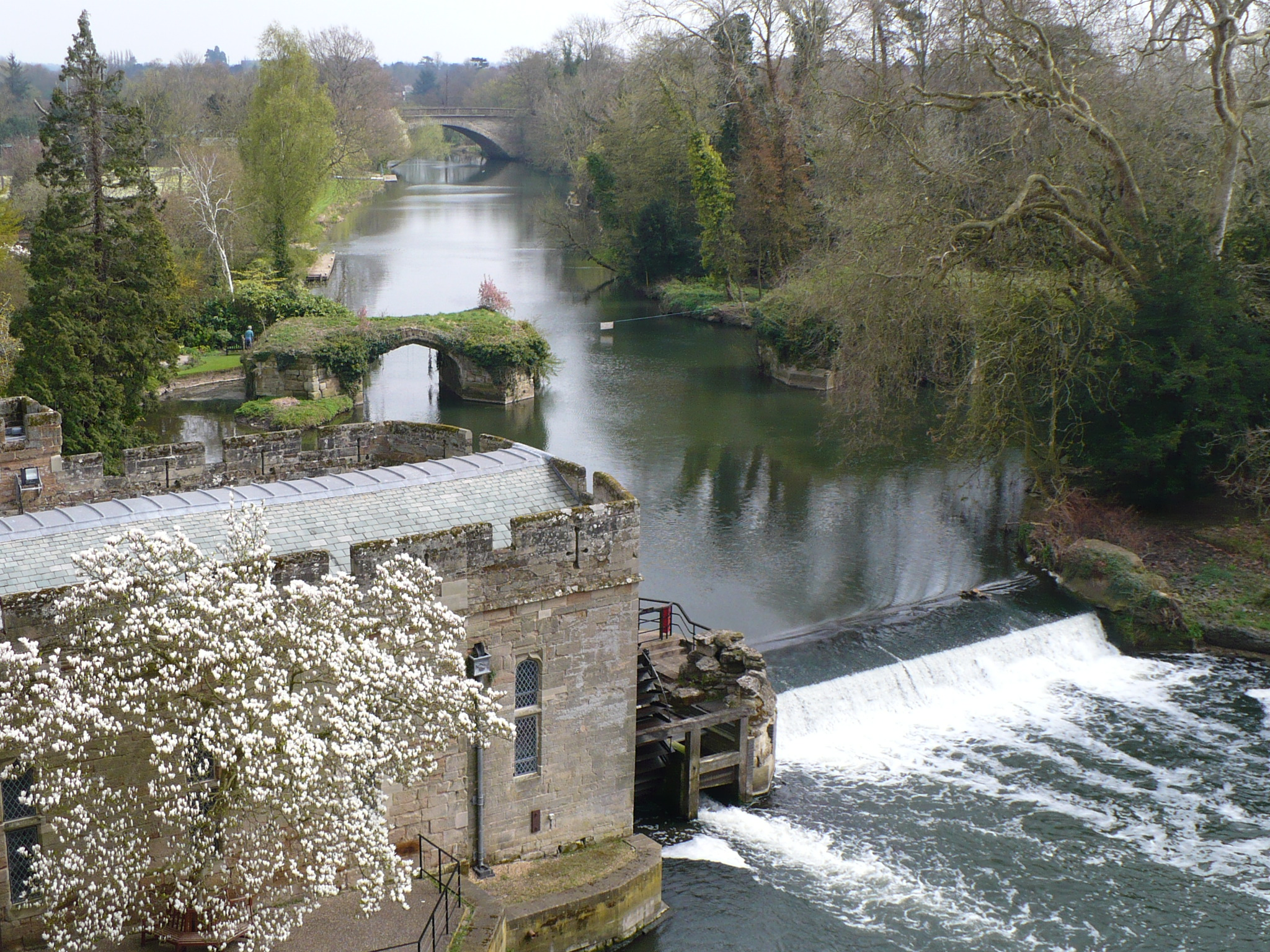
River Avon at Warwick, near the castle.

The Grand Union Canal passes through Warwick. The restored Saltisford Canal Arm is close to the town centre – it is a short branch of the Grand Union Canal, the remains of the original terminus of the Warwick and Birmingham Canal, dating back to 1799. The Saltisford Canal Trust has restored most of the surviving canal, which is now the mooring for colourful narrowboats and a waterside park open to the public.

The River Avon which also passes through the town is not navigable as far as Warwick; the navigable stretch of the river currently ends at Stratford-upon-Avon. There have been proposals made to extend the Avon navigation to Warwick, which would involve the construction of seven new locks, some dredging, and some new canal sections. The most recent proposals, which would have seen the river linked with the Grand Union Canal at Warwick, failed to win the support of the local council in 2019.

=== Air ===
The nearest international airport to Warwick is Birmingham Airport, about 20 miles (32 km) by road from the town centre. There also used to be a Royal Air Force station called RAF Warwick.

== Twin towns ==
The town of Warwick has formal twinning arrangements with three European towns:

- Saumur, France (since 1976)
- Verden, Germany (since 1989)
- Hérouville-Saint-Clair, France (since 2025)

And partnership links with two more European towns:

- Havelberg, Germany
- Formigine, Italy

There is also a friendship link between Warwick District and Bo District in Sierra Leone.
