= Lord Leycester Hotel =

Hotel in Warwick, England

Coordinates: 52.2818°N 1.5865°W

The Lord Leycester Hotel, often known simply as the Lord Leycester, is a former hotel in Warwick, England, that is located on Jury Street in the centre of the town. The building has variously been private housing, a hotel, and an inn during its history. Both the main building and the annexe are Grade II-listed buildings.

== History ==
Jury Street House was built in the 16th century, and was originally the property of Ward of Barford, an Elizabethan merchant. In 1654 it was purchased by Sir Simon Archer, MP then local Justice of the Peace, as his town residence.

In 1694, it was the 0.5 metre thick stone walls of Jury Street House that prevented the Great Fire of Warwick, which destroyed the town's centre, from progressing down Jury Street to the half-timbered houses beyond. In the 18th century the town centre was rebuilt in Georgian style, and Jury Street House was given the Georgian frontage that it has retained to 2005.

The Archer family of Umberslade in Tanworth-in-Arden, who added the frontage and made extensive alterations, then turned Jury Street House into the Three Tuns Inn. In 1800 the inn was sold to John Evans, who divided it into two town houses, numbers 17 and 19 Jury Street. In 1925, Arthur Henry Tyack, the then owner of the Warwick Arms hotel, bought 19 Jury Street in order to turn it into a hotel, and opened the Lord Leycester hotel in 1926. In 1927 Tyack bought 17 Jury Street as well and combined the two back into a single whole.

During World War II, the hotel was requisitioned for use by the Ministry of Production. It was handed over to the United States military in 1943, which used it as an Officers' Club, adding the "tower" extension. At the end of the war, the hotel was handed back to Tyack.

In 1967 the hotel was bought by Norfolk Hotels, and in 1998 it was bought by Hoby Hotels. It closed in summer 2016 for conversion to residential use.
