= Great Fire of Warwick =

Fire in Warwick

Coordinates: 52.2802°N 1.5895°W

The Great Fire of Warwick was a major conflagration that swept through the small town of Warwick, England, beginning at 2:00 p.m. on 5 September 1694 and lasting for six hours. The fire started from a stray spark from the blacksmith located in High Street which blew into the thatch. The fire spread quickly down High Street. The town's small population, the close-packed nature of the environment, hot dry weather and the amount of combustible building material all led to the fire's start and spread, and the limited fire-fighting methods which were unfortunately located very close to the fire origin at the time helped transform the small torch fire into a catastrophic event.

== Damage ==
The Collegiate Church of St Mary, Warwick was severely damaged by the fire. This was mostly due to the townspeople fleeing to the church for protection, one of only a few stone buildings in the town, as they fled however they carried their possessions with them, some of which were either ablaze or smoldering. These set aflame the timber supports of the stone church causing it to collapse. Fire progressed through Castle Street, Market Street, and High Street until it was halted by the 0.5 metre thick stone walls of the former Lord Leycester Hotel on Jury Street. If the fire had not been stopped by the church and struck the suburbs, it would have burnt all the way to the edge of town. The original estimates had the financial damage totalling around £90,000–£120,000 and the physical damage at around 250–460 houses, but later the Book of Estimates had the damage at 157 houses totalling between £40,000–£60,000.

== Effects on architecture ==
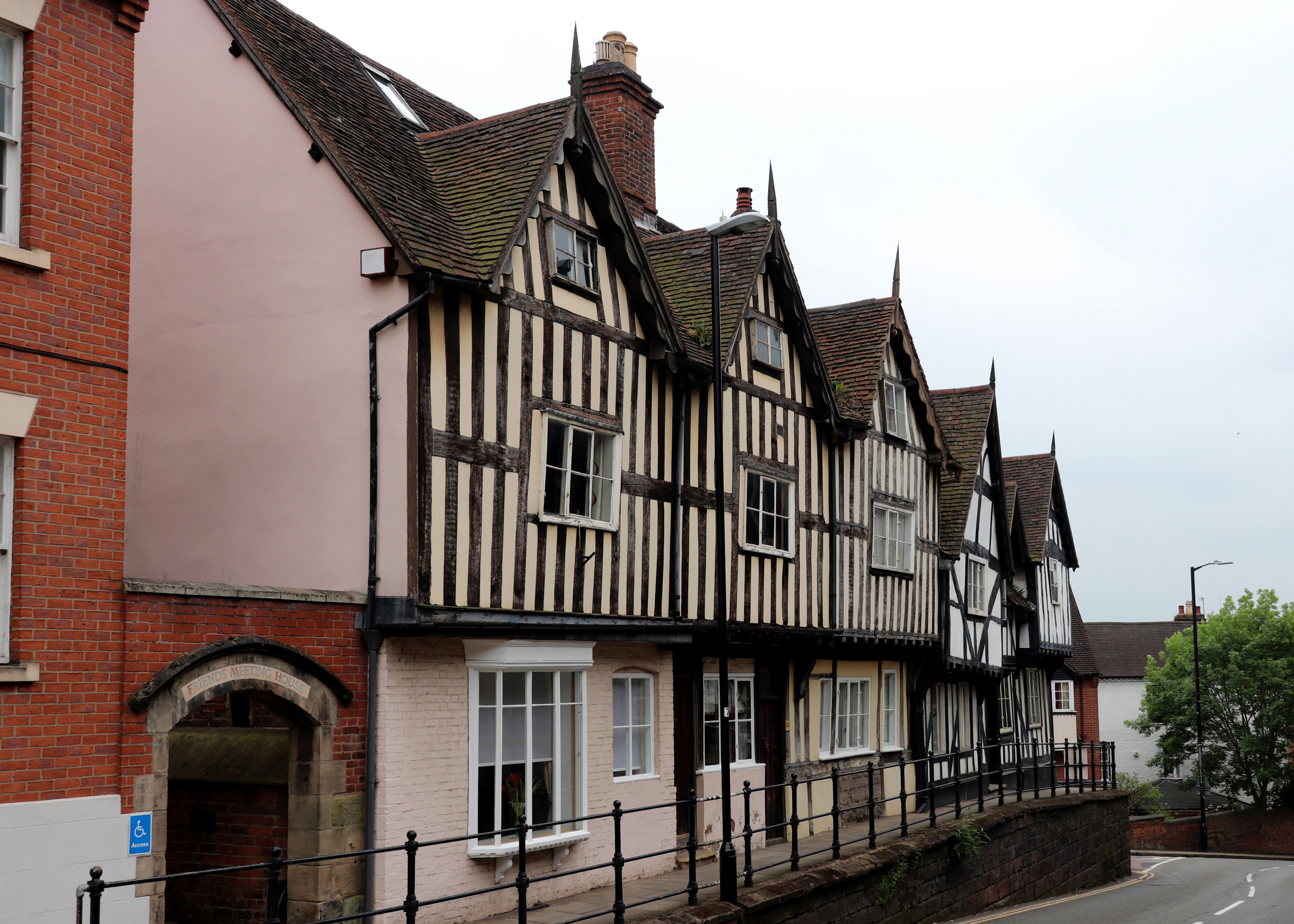
Houses opposite the Lord Leycester Hospital. The red brick indicates the Friends Meeting House where the Great Fire of Warwick began in 1694

The Great Fire of Warwick made builders review the way they constructed buildings. The Warwick Fire Rebuilding, &c. Act 1694 established new rules and regulations on architecture. The act stated that public streets and roads should all be made a certain regulated width. It also provided regulations for a standard house design: two storeys of 10 feet in height each with cellars and garrets. This gave the town of Warwick symmetry, uniformity, and a new flair. The fire caused an urban design revolution of sorts. The post-fire homes in Warwick also got rid of the jetted façades and the concept of timber-framed construction in which floors of buildings overhung each other. The town gave compensation to those whose property was destroyed by the street widening process just so that the Fire Act rules would be followed.

The beautiful post-fire buildings are credited to Francis and William Smith. In 1695, William was appointed as the surveyor for the fire council. Although he was officially appointed just to follow the council's orders, William took some direction to oversee the rebuilding himself. William throughout his life had a lasting legacy on Warwick, twice serving as the city's mayor from 1713–1714 and 1728–1729. Francis joined his brother in the reconstruction of St. Mary's Church, but later became a successful architect, overseeing the project of the new courthouse. Francis also had a lasting impact on the town. Francis served on the town corporation in the 1720s and was the head of maintenance during the 1730s until he died in 1738. The Smith brothers had a lasting impact on the new and beautiful architecture of Warwick and passed on the tradition of architecture to their sons.
