= Beckwith =

Beckwith may refer to

== Places ==
- Beckwith, North Yorkshire, England, United Kingdom
- Beckwith, Ontario, township in eastern Ontario, Canada
- Beckwith, California, former name of Beckwourth, California, United States
- Beckwith, West Virginia, United States

== People ==
- Beckwith baronets, an English title from 1681 to 1796
- Abijah Beckwith (New York politician) (1785–1874), New York politician
- Abijah Beckwith (Wisconsin politician) (1843–1897), Wisconsin politician
- Andrew Beckwith (born 1995), American baseball player
- Asahel C. Beckwith (1827–1896), Wyoming senator
- Athelstan Beckwith (1930–2010), Australian chemist
- Bob Beckwith (1932–2024), American firefighter
- Carol Beckwith, photographer
- Charles Beckwith (disambiguation)
- Christopher Beckwith (born 1945), American linguist and historian
- Clarence Beckwith (1849–1931), American theologian
- Cora Jipson Beckwith (1875–1955), American zoologist
- Corydon Beckwith (1823–1890), American jurist and lawyer
- Darry Beckwith (born 1987), American footballer
- Dean Beckwith (born 1983), English footballer
- Denise Beckwith (born 1977), Australian swimmer
- Edward Griffin Beckwith (1818–1881), conducted one of the Pacific Railroad Surveys
- Emma Beckwith (1849–1919), American suffragette, bookkeeper, optician and inventor
- Francis J. Beckwith (born 1960), legal scholar
- Frank R. Beckwith (1904–1965), American lawyer and civil rights activist
- Henry L. P. Beckwith Jr. (born 1935), American author
- Holmes Beckwith, American political scientist
- George Beckwith (British Army officer) (1753–1823)
- George Beckwith (Carl Jung associate) (1896–1931), American patient and associate of Carl Jung
- Gladys Beckwith (1929–2020), American women's studies academic
- Holmes Beckwith (1884–1921), American academic
- J. Bruce Beckwith (1933–2025), American pediatric pathologist
- James Carroll Beckwith (1852–1917), American portrait painter
- James R. Beckwith (1857–1935), American politician
- James P. Beckwith, better known as James Beckwourth (1800−1866), trapper, Indian chief, fur trader, scout
- Jefferson H. Beckwith (1813–1865), American politician
- Joe Beckwith (1955–2021), American baseball player
- John Beckwith (disambiguation)
- Jon Beckwith (born 1935), American microbiologist
- Josiah Beckwith (1734–?), English antiquary
- Julia Catherine Beckwith (1796–1867), Canadian novelist
- Kendell Beckwith (born 1994), American football player
- Laurette Beckwith (1896–1956), American politician
- Lillian Beckwith, English author
- Mark M. Beckwith, American bishop
- Martha Warren Beckwith (1871–1959), American folklorist
- Mary Lincoln Beckwith (1898–1975), great-granddaughter of Abraham Lincoln
- Mayhew Beckwith (1798–1871), Canadian merchant and politician
- Michael Beckwith, New Thought minister
- Naomi Beckwith (born 1976), American curator
- Reginald Beckwith (1908–1965), English actor
- Rob Beckwith (born 1984), English footballer
- Robert Todd Lincoln Beckwith (1904–1985), great-grandson of Abraham Lincoln
- Roger Beckwith (disambiguation)
  - Sir Roger Beckwith (died 1700), 1st Beckwith baronet
  - Sir Roger Beckwith (1682–1743), 2nd Beckwith baronet who also served as the High Sheriff of Yorkshire
  - Roger Beckwith (actor) (born Wilhelm von Brincken) (1881–1946), German diplomat and spy who later became an American actor
  - Roger T. Beckwith (1929–2023), English church historian and liturgist
- Sandra Beckwith (born 1943), American judge
- Tamara Beckwith (born 1970), English socialite
- Thomas Beckwith (1731–1786), English painter
- Thomas Sydney Beckwith (1775–1831), British army officer
- Wally Beckwith (1893–1983), Australian runner and footballer
- Warren Wallace Beckwith, Lincoln family member
- William Beckwith (1795–1871), English Army officer

== Other uses ==
- Beckwith Company, American book publisher
- Beckwith Island, Ontario, Canada

== See also ==
- Byron De La Beckwith, American murderer of Medgar Evers
- Beckworth, a surname
- James Beckwourth, grandson of the 3rd Beckwith baronet
