= Arthur Beckwith =

Arthur Beckwith may refer to:

- Arthur Beckwith (died 1700) of the Beckwith baronets
- Arthur Beckwith (violinist) of the Philharmonic Quartet

== See also ==
- Beckwith (surname)
