= John Beckwith =

John Beckwith may refer to:

== Music ==
- John Christmas Beckwith (1750–1809), English organist and composer
- John Charles Beckwith (organist) (1788–1819), English organist
- John Beckwith (composer) (1927–2022), Canadian composer

== Politics ==
- John Adolphus Beckwith (1800–1880), Canadian politician
- John L. Beckwith (1856–1934), Canadian entrepreneur and politician
- John Beckwith (MP) for Lewes

== Sports ==
- John Beckwith (baseball) (1900–1956), American baseball player, infielder in the Negro leagues
- John Beckwith (footballer) (1932–2024), Australian rules football player and coach

== Others ==
- John Beckwith (major-general), commanded the 20th Regiment of Foot at the Battle of Minden (1759)
- John Charles Beckwith (British Army officer) (1789–1862), British army officer
- John W. Beckwith (1831–1890), American clergyman, Second Bishop of Georgia
- John Beckwith (curator) (1918–1991), museum curator and art historian
- Sir John Beckwith (entrepreneur) (born 1947), British business tycoon
- John Bruce Beckwith (1933–2025), American pathologist

== Characters ==
- John Beckwith (character), main character in the movie "Wedding Crashers", played by Owen Wilson

== See also ==
- Jon Beckwith (born 1935), American microbiologist
- Jonathan Beckwith (disambiguation)
- Beckwith (disambiguation)
