= Jonathan Beckwith =

Jonathan Beckwith may refer to:

- Sir Jonathan Beckwith, 4th Baronet of the Beckwith baronets (died 1796)
- Jon Beckwith (born 1935), American microbiologist

== See also ==
- John Beckwith (disambiguation)
- Beckwith (disambiguation)
