= Farebrother =

Farebrother is a surname of English origin. Notable people with the surname include:

- Bernard Farebrother (1846–1888), English organist
- Ernest William Farebrother (died 1891), English architect
- Michael Farebrother (1920–1987), English cricketer
- Violet Farebrother (1888–1969), English actress
