= Collegiate Church of St Mary, Warwick =

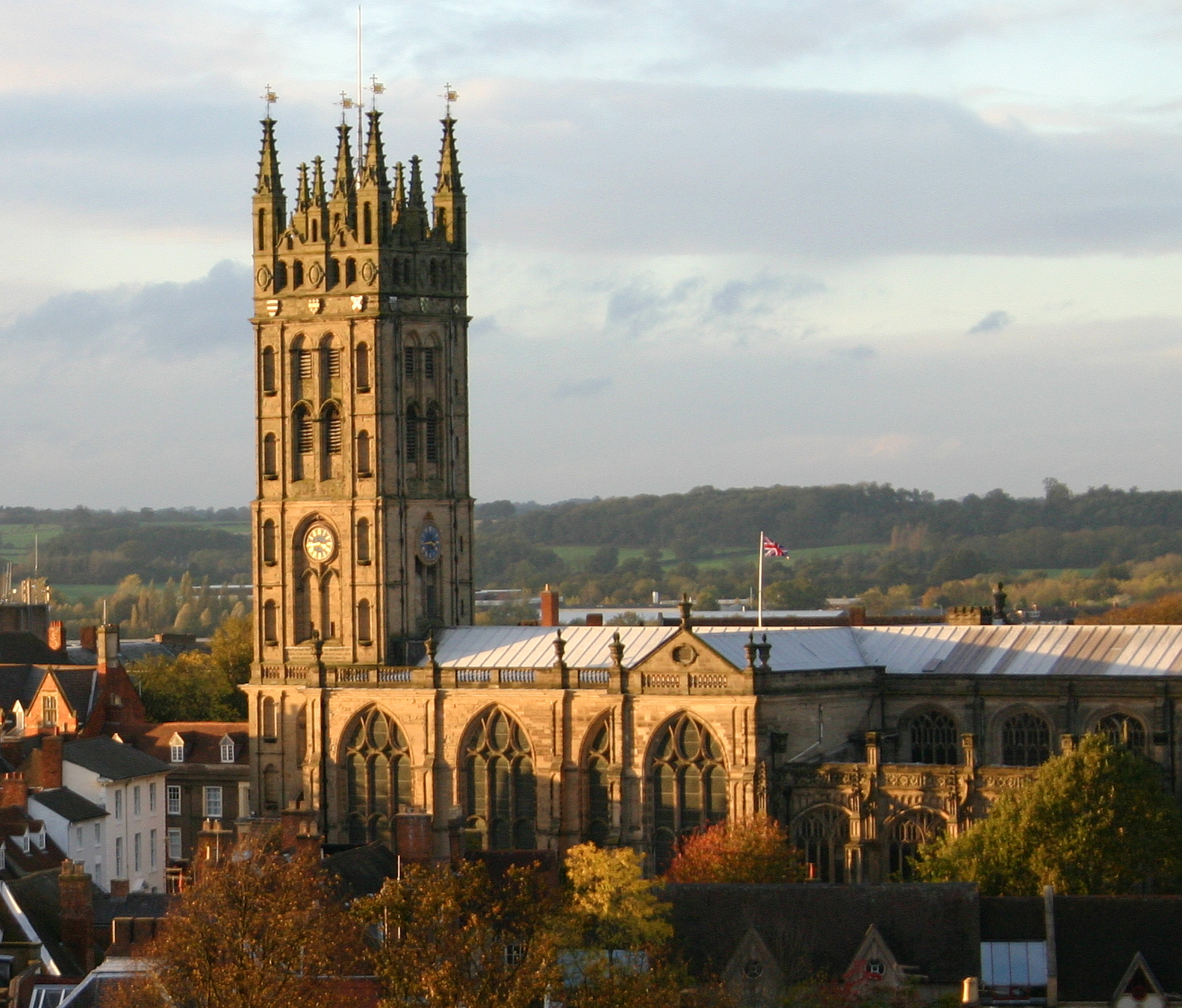
- Tower and nave of the church as viewed from Warwick Castle
- Collegiate Church of St Mary, Warwick
- 52°16′56″N 1°35′17″W
- OS grid reference: SP 28199 64982
- Location: Old Square
- Address: Warwick, Warwickshire
- Country: England
- Denomination: Church of England
- Churchmanship: High Church
- Website: website

History
- Founded: 1123-?
- Dedication: Blessed Virgin Mary

Administration
- Province: Canterbury
- Diocese: Coventry
- Archdeaconry: Warwick
- Deanery: Warwick & Leamington
- Parish: Warwick, St Mary

Clergy
- Vicar: The Rev'd Canon Angus Aagaard CF

Listed Building – Grade I
- Official name: Church of Saint Mary including Beauchamp Chapel
- Designated: 10 January 1953
- Reference no.: 1035500

The Collegiate Church of St Mary is a Church of England parish church in Warwick, Warwickshire, England. It is in the centre of the town just east of the market place. It is Grade I listed, and a member of the Major Churches Network.

The church has the status of collegiate church as it had a college of secular canons. In governance and religious observance it was similar to a cathedral (although not the seat of a bishop and without diocesan responsibilities). There is a Bishop of Warwick, but this is an episcopal title used by a suffragan bishop of the Diocese of Coventry.

== History ==
=== Foundation and early years ===
The church foundations date back nine hundred years, being created by Roger de Beaumont, 2nd Earl of Warwick, in 1123. In addition to founding the church, de Beaumont established the college of dean and canons at the church. The only surviving part of the Norman church which de Beaumont had built is the crypt.

The chancel vestries and chapter house of the church were extensively rebuilt in the 14th century by a later Earl of Warwick, Thomas de Beauchamp (died 1369, later pronounced Beecham), in the Perpendicular Gothic style. Between c. 1370 and 1394, the chancel, transept, nave and aisles were rebuilt, then forming a basilica with wooden roofs. Thomas Beauchamp's descendants built the Chapel of Our Lady, commonly known as the Beauchamp Chapel. It contains the effigial monuments of Richard de Beauchamp, 13th Earl of Warwick, Ambrose Dudley, 3rd Earl of Warwick, and Robert Dudley, 1st Earl of Leicester. Buried in the chancel of the church is William Parr, 1st Marquess of Northampton, the brother of queen consort Catherine Parr.

=== Sixteenth century onwards ===
The college was dissolved in 1546, and the church was granted by the Crown to the burgesses of Warwick. Before their destruction in the Civil War, Wenceslaus Hollar copied many of the stained glass windows in the Beauchamp Chapel, showing heraldry of the Beauchamp family.

The church, along with much of Warwick, was devastated by the Great Fire of Warwick in 1693. The nave and tower of the building were completely destroyed. In 1704, the rebuilt church was completed in a Gothic design by William Wilson (appointed by the Crown Commissioners). Sir Christopher Wren is also said to have contributed to the design, but that is disputed. The tower rises to the height of 130 feet (40 m). The design was described by John Summerson as being "as remarkable for its success as for its independence in style from other seventeenth-century English Gothic".

The church has been undergoing significant maintenance for renovation since early 2023 and is expected to be complete by the end of 2023. At a cost of £1.4 million, the renovation was planned after a piece of masonry fell from the church's tower.

=== Deans of the College ===
- Robert Plesset, 1282
- Thomas de Sodynton, 1290
- William de Apperley, 1297
- Robert Tankard, 1306
- Richard de Alcester, 1313
- Robert de Geryn, 1314
- Robert de Lee, 1321
- Thomas Lench, 1338
- Robert de Endredeby, 1340
- Nicholas Southam, 1361
- Thomas Yonge, 1395
- John Porter, 1432
- Robert Cherbury, 1443
- William Berkswell, 14
- John Southwell, 1469
- Edmund Albone, M.D., 1481
- Richard Brackenburgh, 1485
- William Stokedale, 1498
- Edward Haseley, 1498
- Ralph Colingwode, 1507
- John Allestre, 1510
- John Carvanell, 1515
- John Knightley, 1542

== Music ==
=== Organs ===
There are two organs in St Mary's, the transept organ and one at the west end. The specifications of both organs can be found on the National Pipe Organ Register. The Transept Organ has been rebuilt several times since the 19th century. The West End Organ is described as having been built in 1980. The NPOR does not give a date for the organ case with its gilt diapasons, which appears to predate the instrument itself.

=== Organists (prior to 1976) ===
- William Witteney 1409
- John Soursby 1432
- John Skyrrowe 1562
- Richard Charpe 1565
- Thomas Dean 1719
- William Dean 1744
- Jonathan Hobbs 1773
- Mary Hobbs 1787
- Mrs R. Hobbs 1801
- James Marshall 1802
- Edward Dearle 1833
- William Clayton 1844
- W. Wyver 1861
- James Shaw 1864
- D. Middleton 1864
- Bernard Farebrother 1867
- Edwin Aspa 1871
- A.J. Sutton 1874
- Hanson de la Haye Blackith 1882
- William Bellamy 1886
- William McDuff 1894
- Allen Blackall 1898
- Peter Burton 1946
- Thomas Tunnard 1950
- Douglas Clarke 1958
- Geoffrey Holroyde 1962
- Andrew Fletcher 1973

(The position of Organist was replaced with that of Director of Music from 1976)

=== Directors of Music ===
- Andrew Fletcher 1976 (originally appointed as Organist in 1973)
- Paul Trepte 1981
- Simon Lole 1985
- Mark Shepherd 1994
- Chris Betts 1998
- Katherine Dienes 2001-2007
- Thomas Corns 2008-2017
- Oliver Hancock 2018

=== Assistant Organists ===
- Arthur Wills 1946-48
- Edward Higginbottom 1965-67
- Colin Roy 1967-1969
- Andrew Fletcher 1971-73
- Arthur Hilyer 1974
- Tim Peters
- Charles Matthews 1987-89

(The position of Assistant Organist was replaced with that of Organist from 1989)

=== Organists (from 1989) ===
- Kevin Bowyer 1989
- Christopher Monks 1998

(from 1999 the position of Organist was combined with the new post of assistant director of Music)

=== Organists and assistant directors of Music ===
- Christopher Monks 1999 (originally appointed as Organist in 1998)
- Luke Bond 2002 (assistant director of Music, Truro Cathedral from 2008 to 2017, then at St George's Chapel, Windsor Castle)
- Ruaraidh Sutherland 2006 (Organist at Christ's Hospital from 2019)
- Mark Swinton 2011

== Clock ==
The clock was built by John Smith and Sons of Derby and installed in 1902 There are four dials, each 6 feet 6 inches (1.98 m) across, having gilded figures and minutes. The Cambridge Quarters chime on the 3rd, 4th, 5th and 9th bells, and the hour strikes on the 10th. The clock movement is fixed in the ringing chamber in a glass-fronted case, the connection to the four dials at the higher level being by rods, level wheels, and universal joints, and there are small dials on the movement showing the time indicated by the outside hands. The clock is controlled by Lord Grimthorpe’s double three-legged gravity escapement, and the compensated pendulum was designed to provide less variation than two seconds each week. The hands of the clock are made of copper, gilded and counterposed inside the tower by adjustable balances. The clock was set going on 21 June 1902 by the Countess of Warwick.

== Image gallery ==
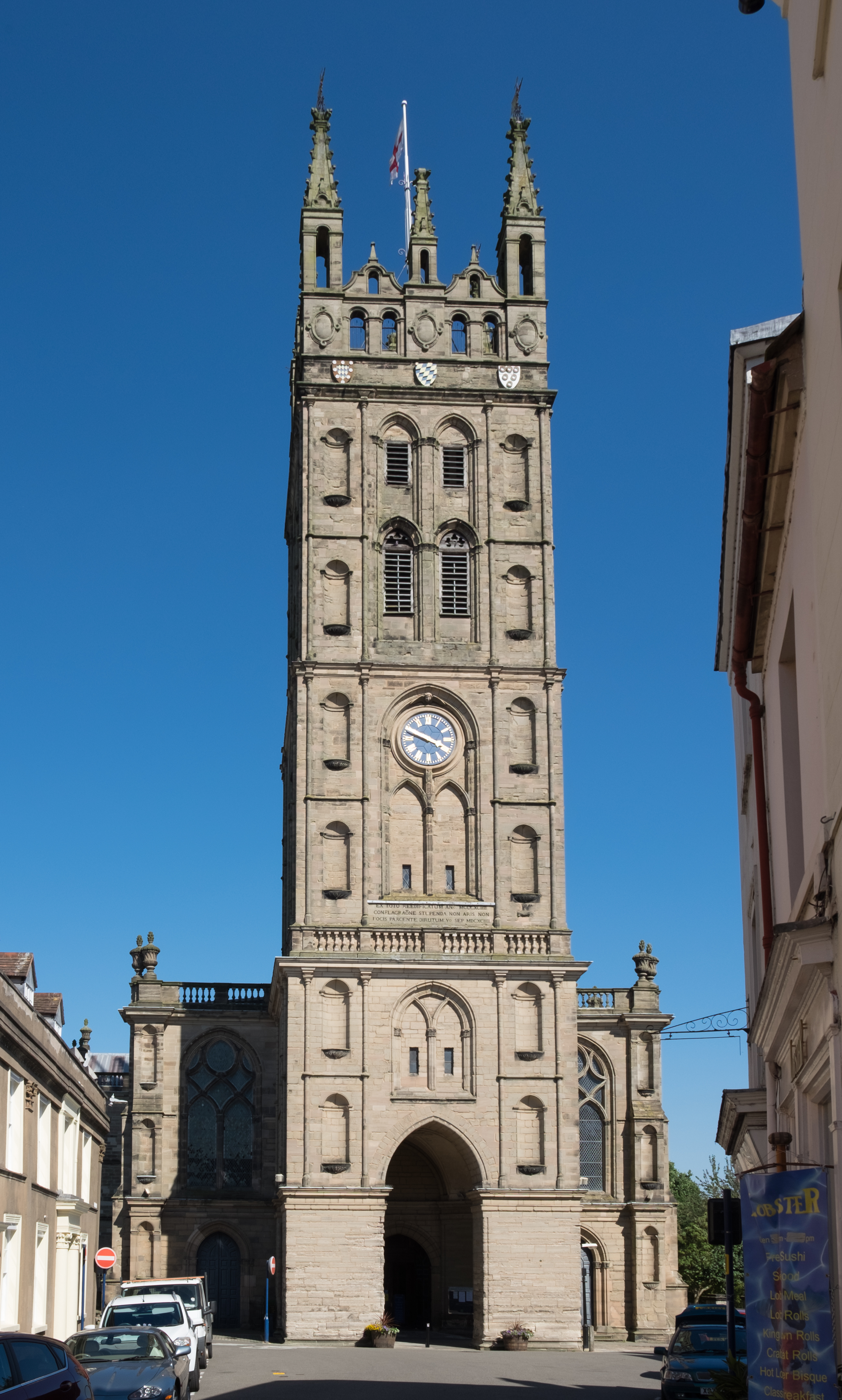
The tower in 2016

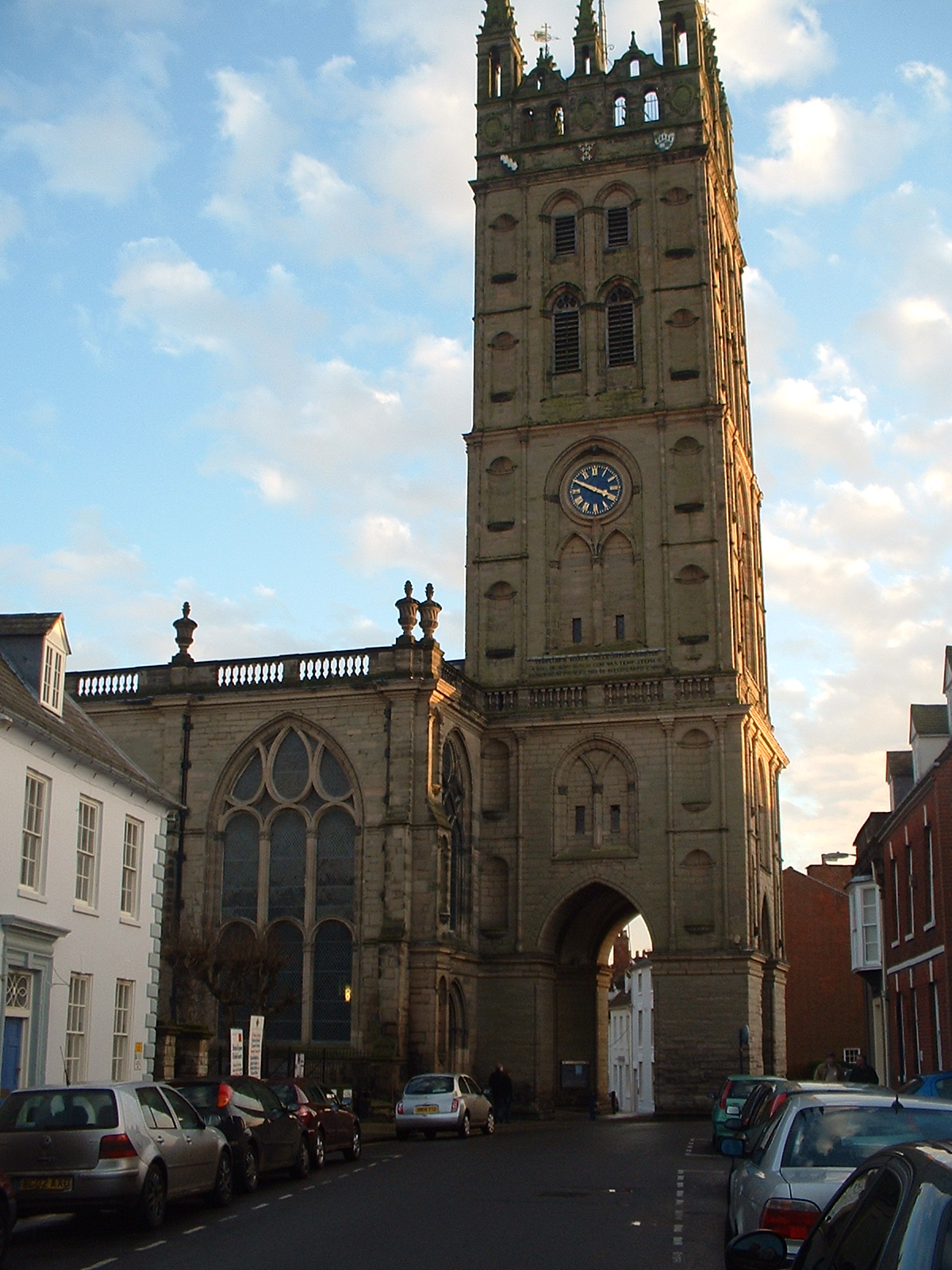
From Northgate Street

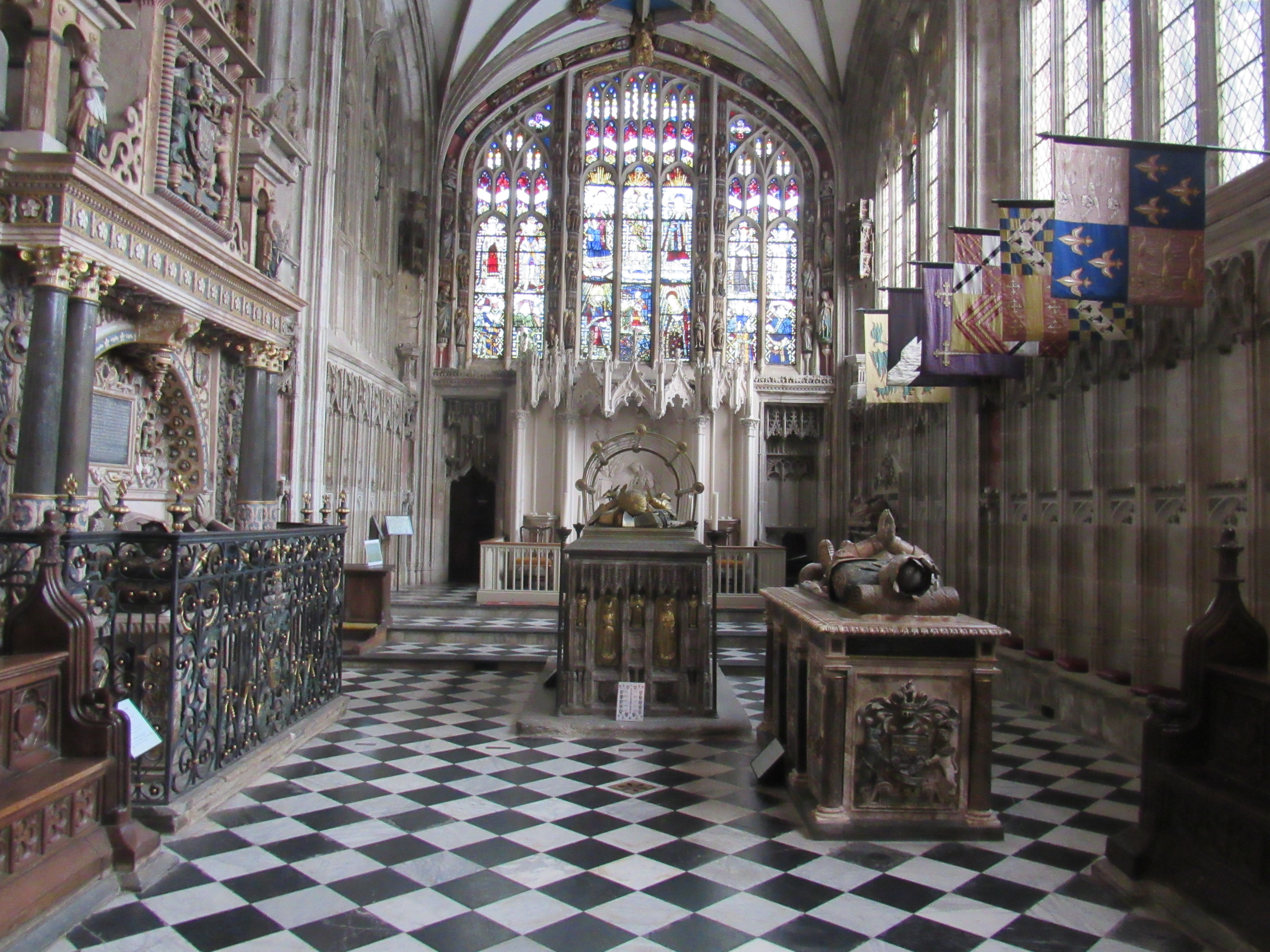
Beauchamp Chapel

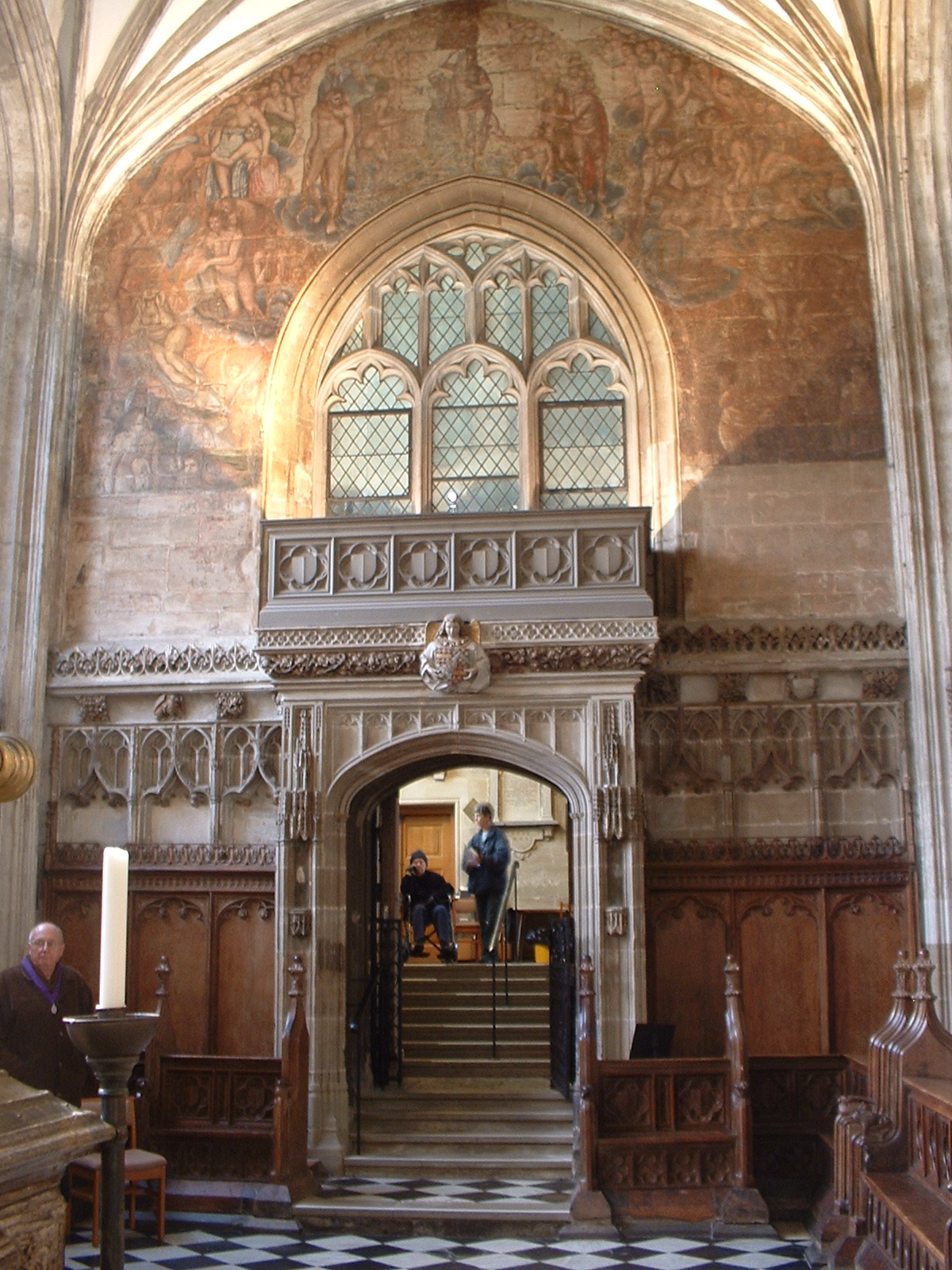
Beauchamp Chapel west wall

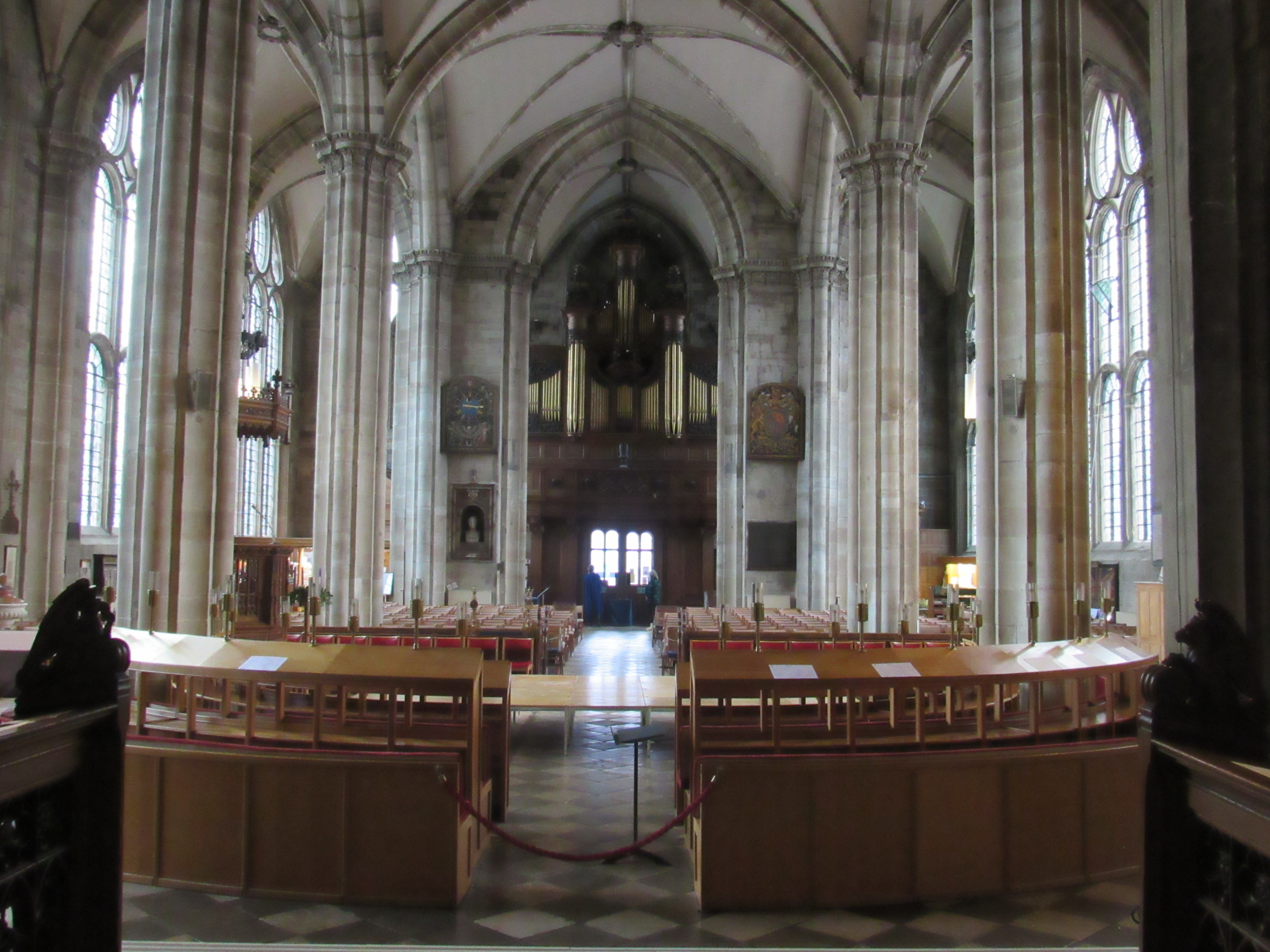
Church Nave Altar

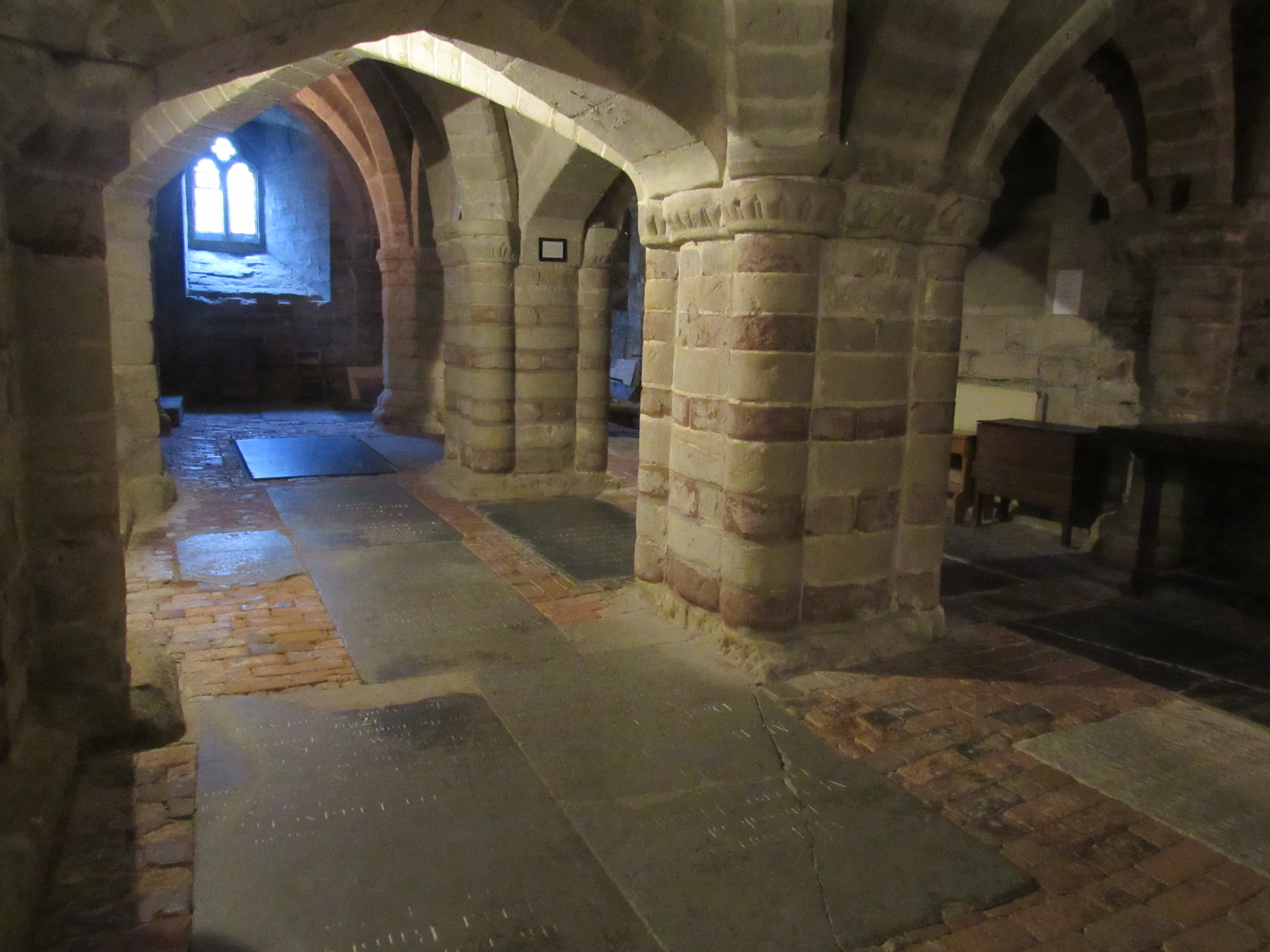
The Crypt

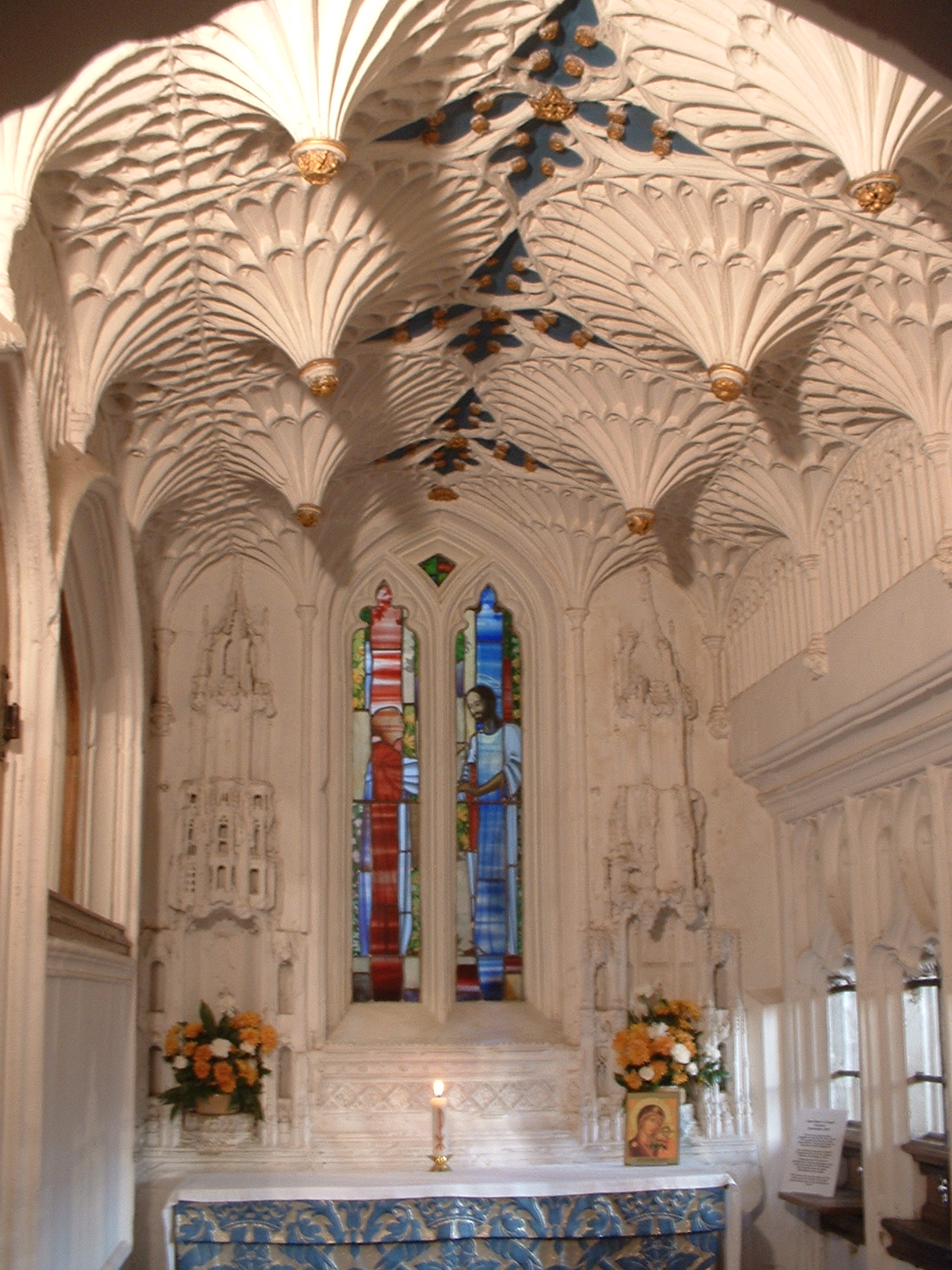
Dean's Chapel

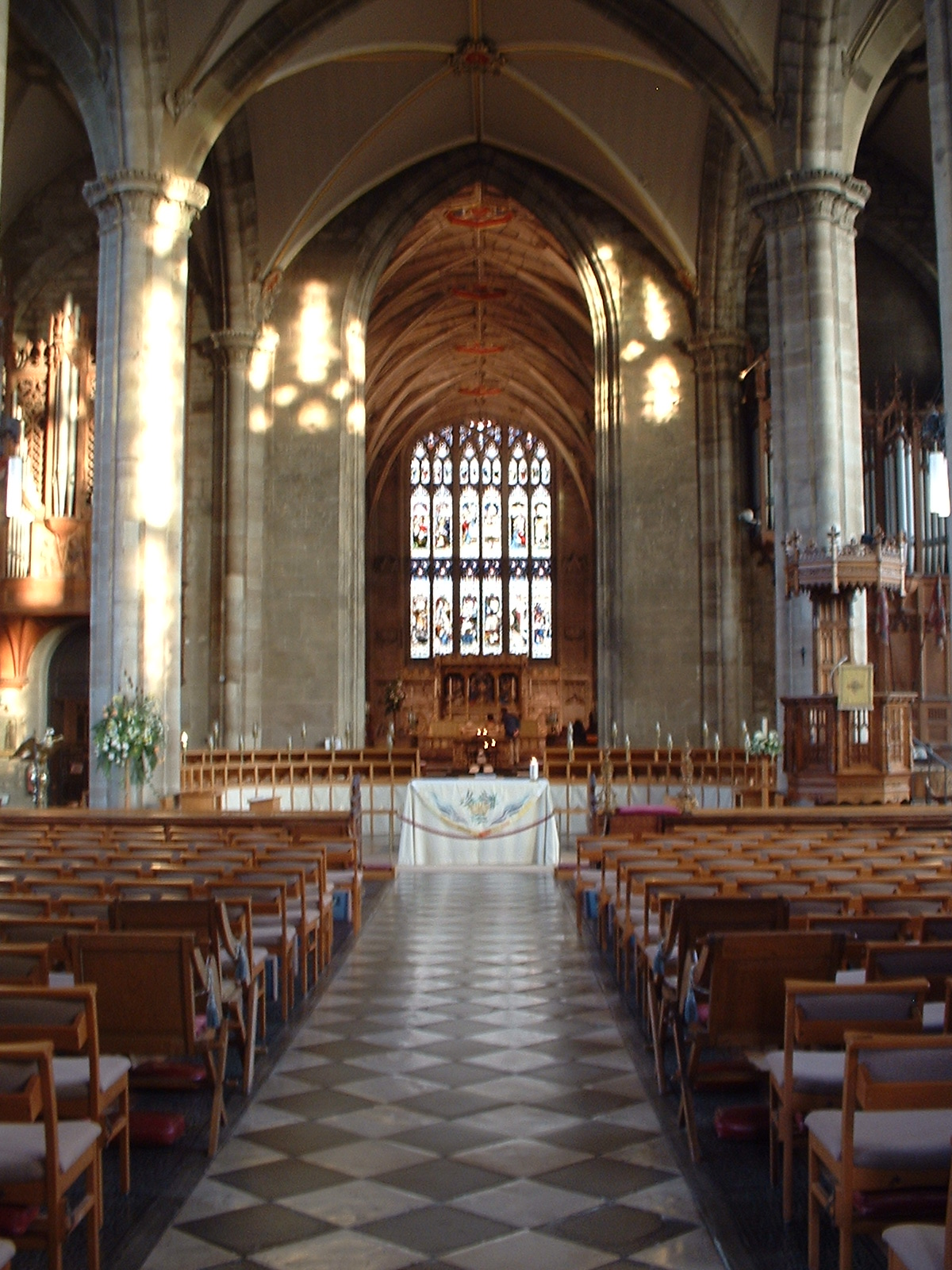
Interior looking east

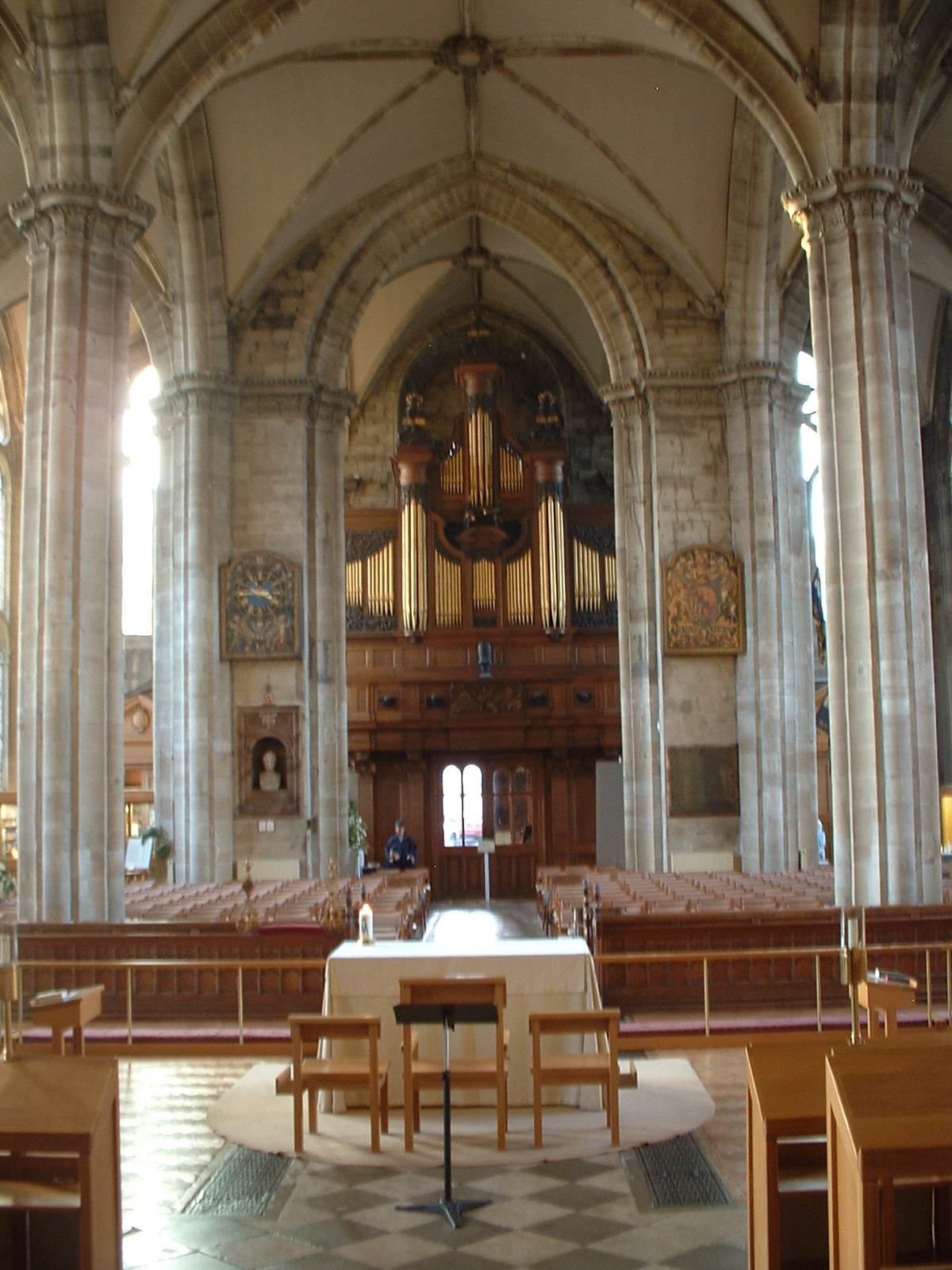
Interior looking west

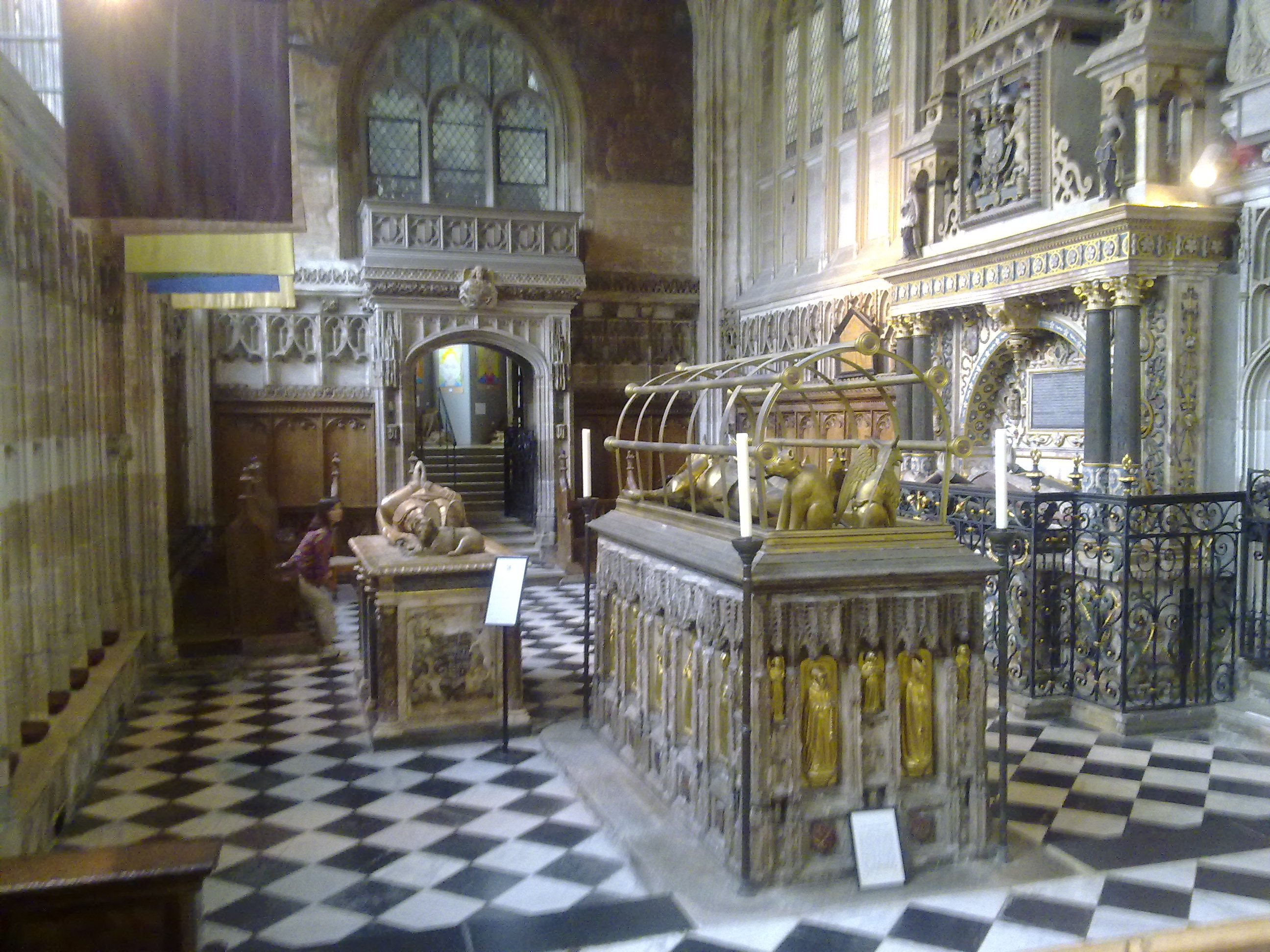
The view from within the Beauchamp Chapel

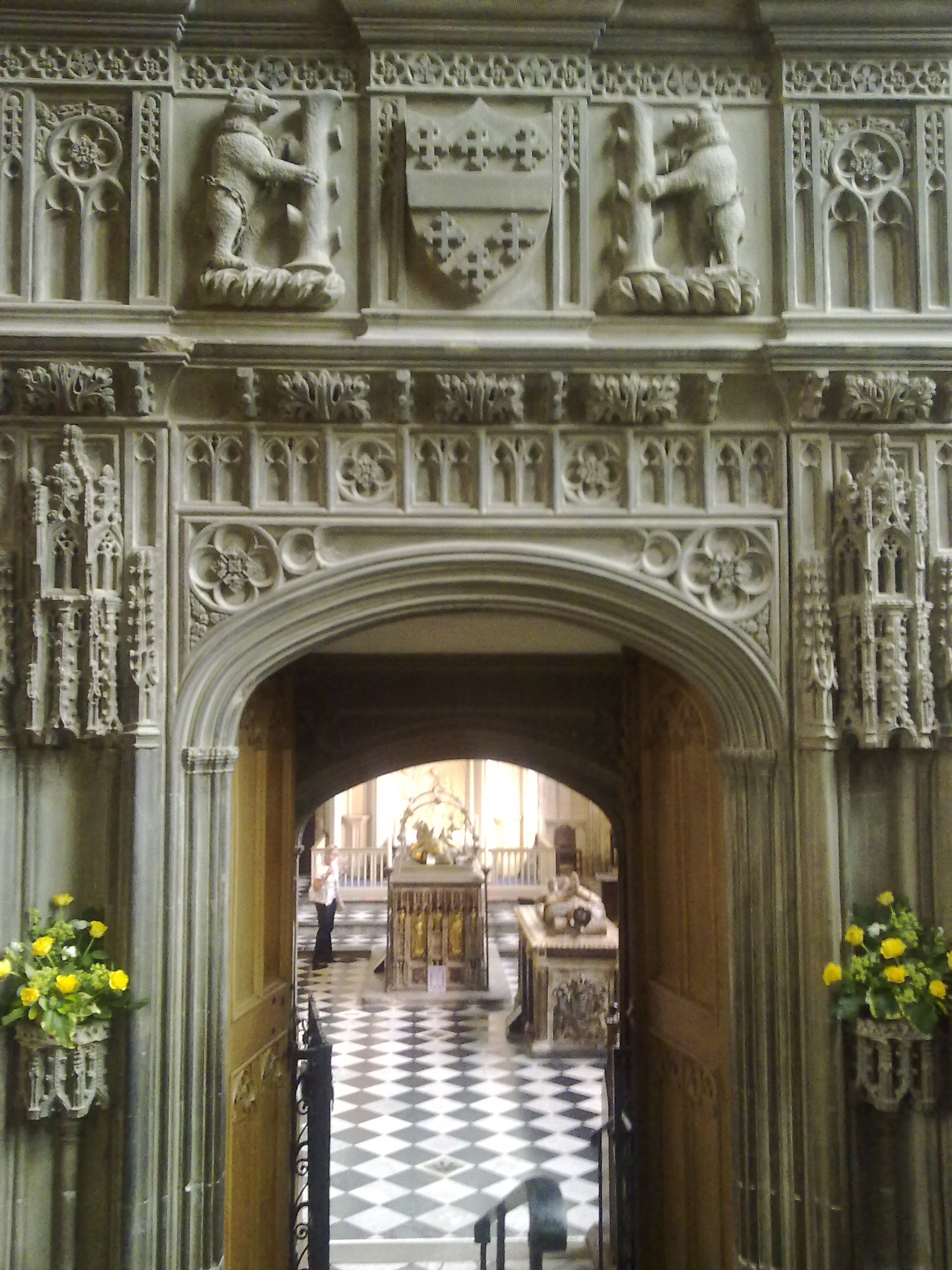
The entrance to the Beauchamp family chapel in St Mary's

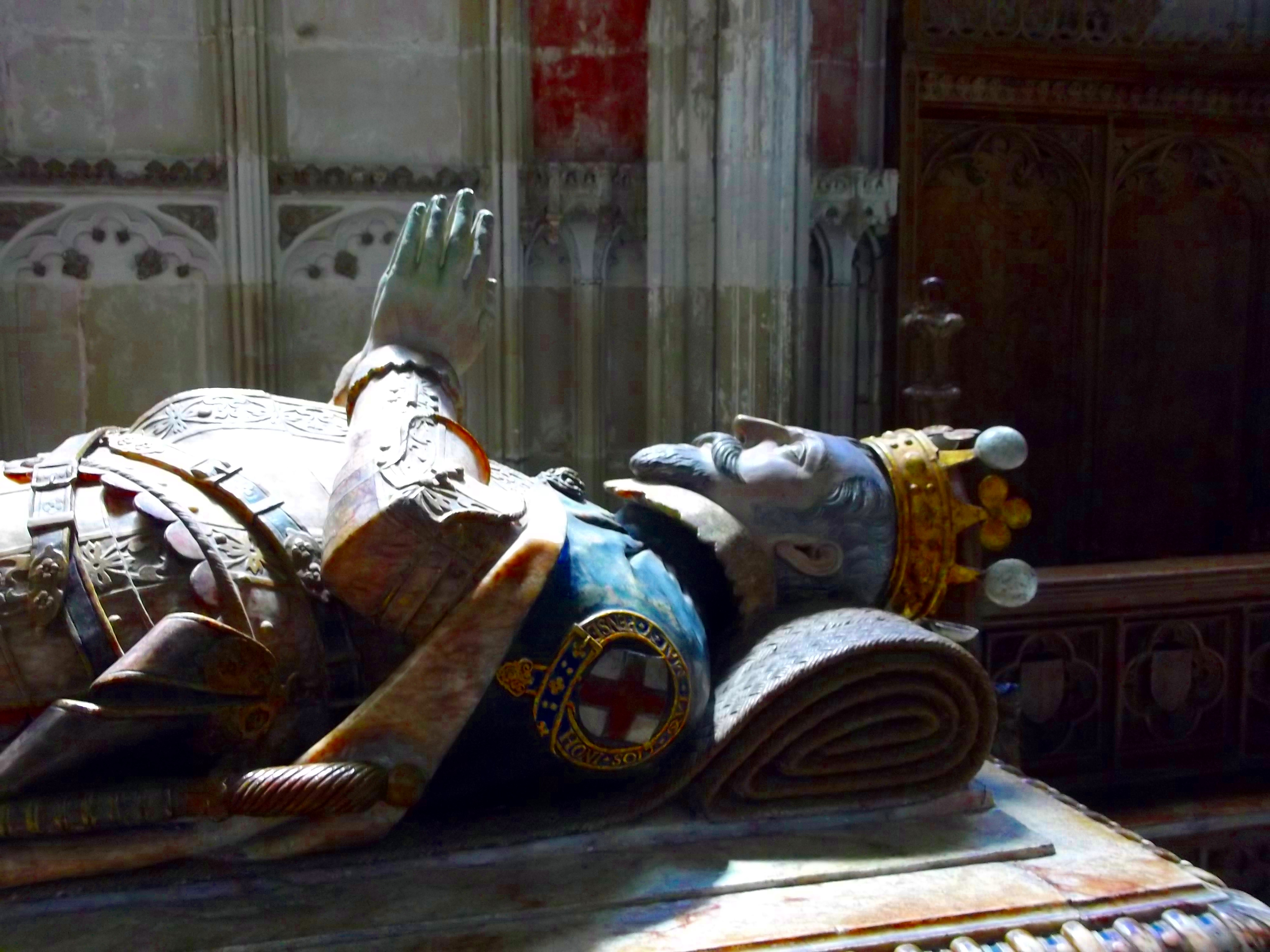
Effigy of Ambrose Dudley on his tomb in the Beauchamp Chapel

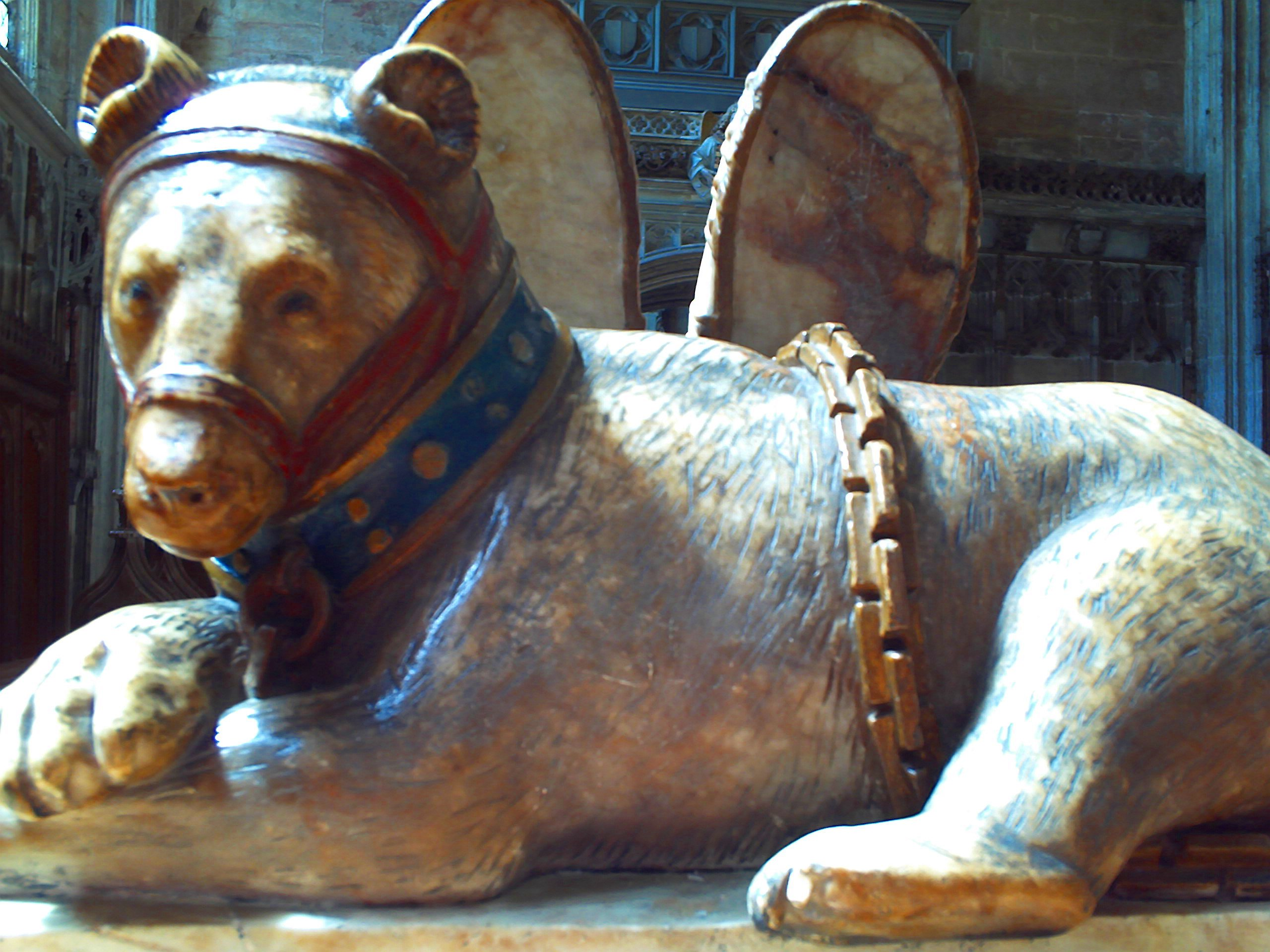
Bear at feet of Ambrose Dudley on his tomb

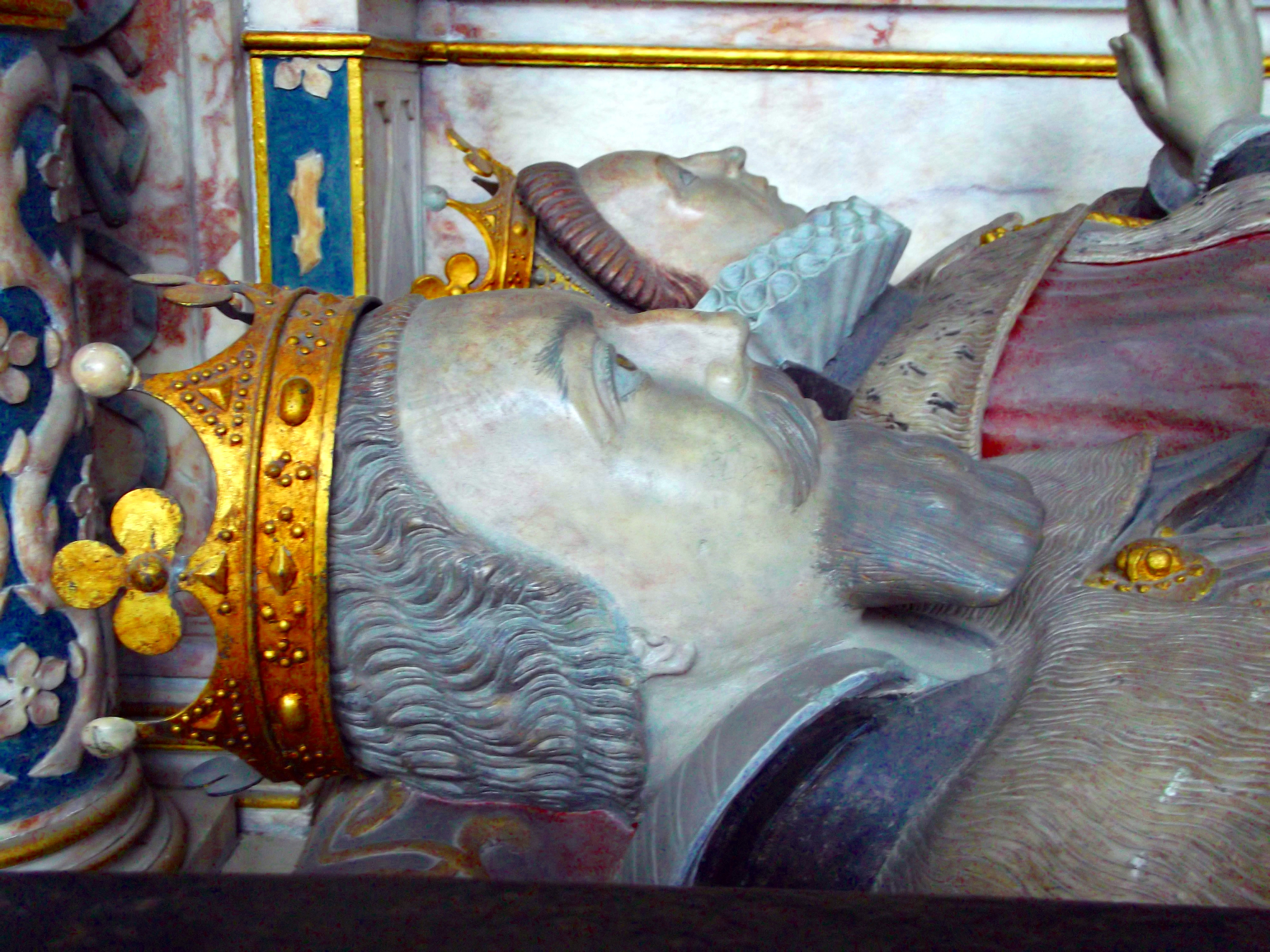
Effigies of Robert Dudley and Lettice Knollys on their tomb in the Beauchamp Chapel

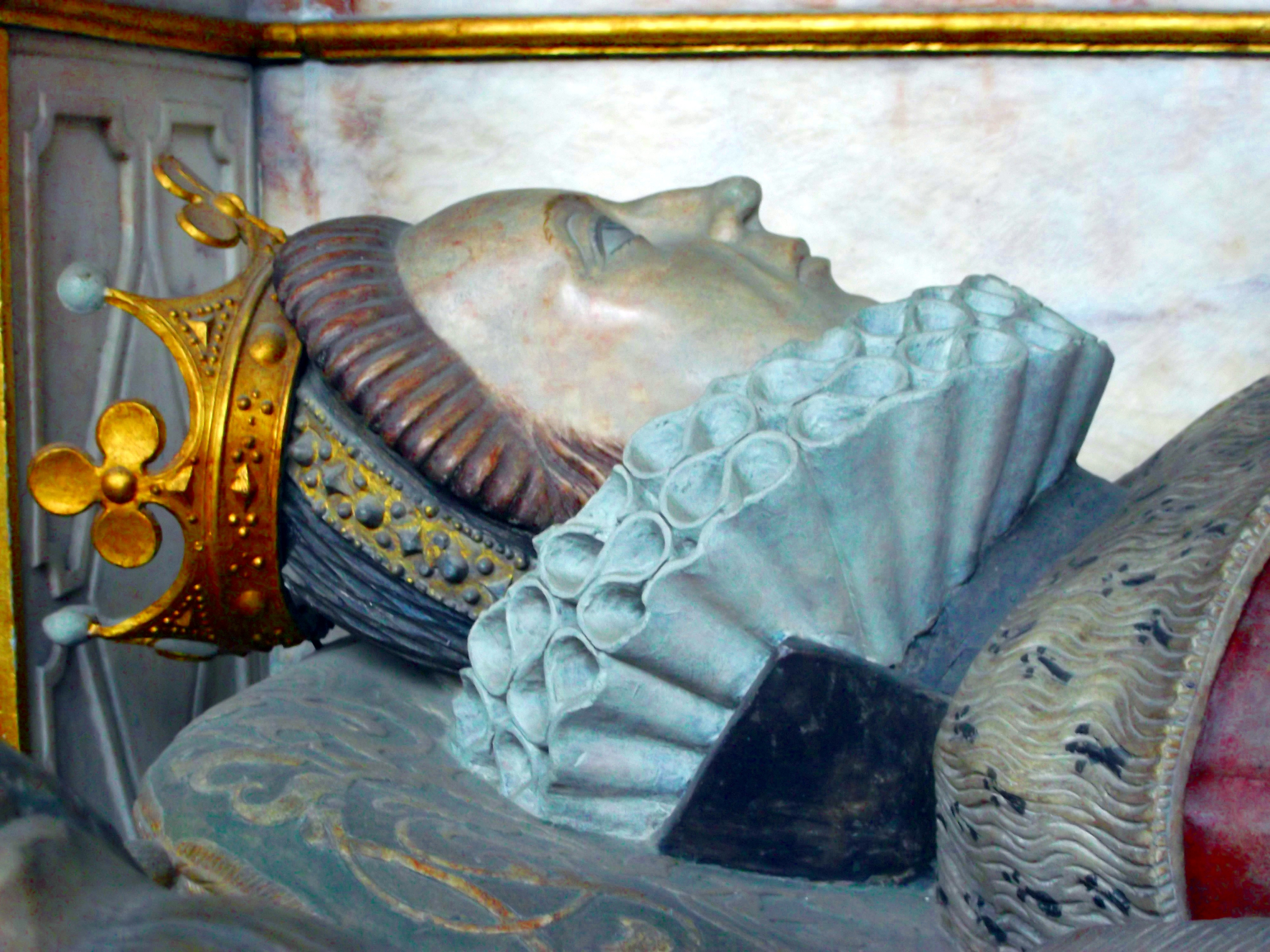
Effigy of Lettice Knollys.

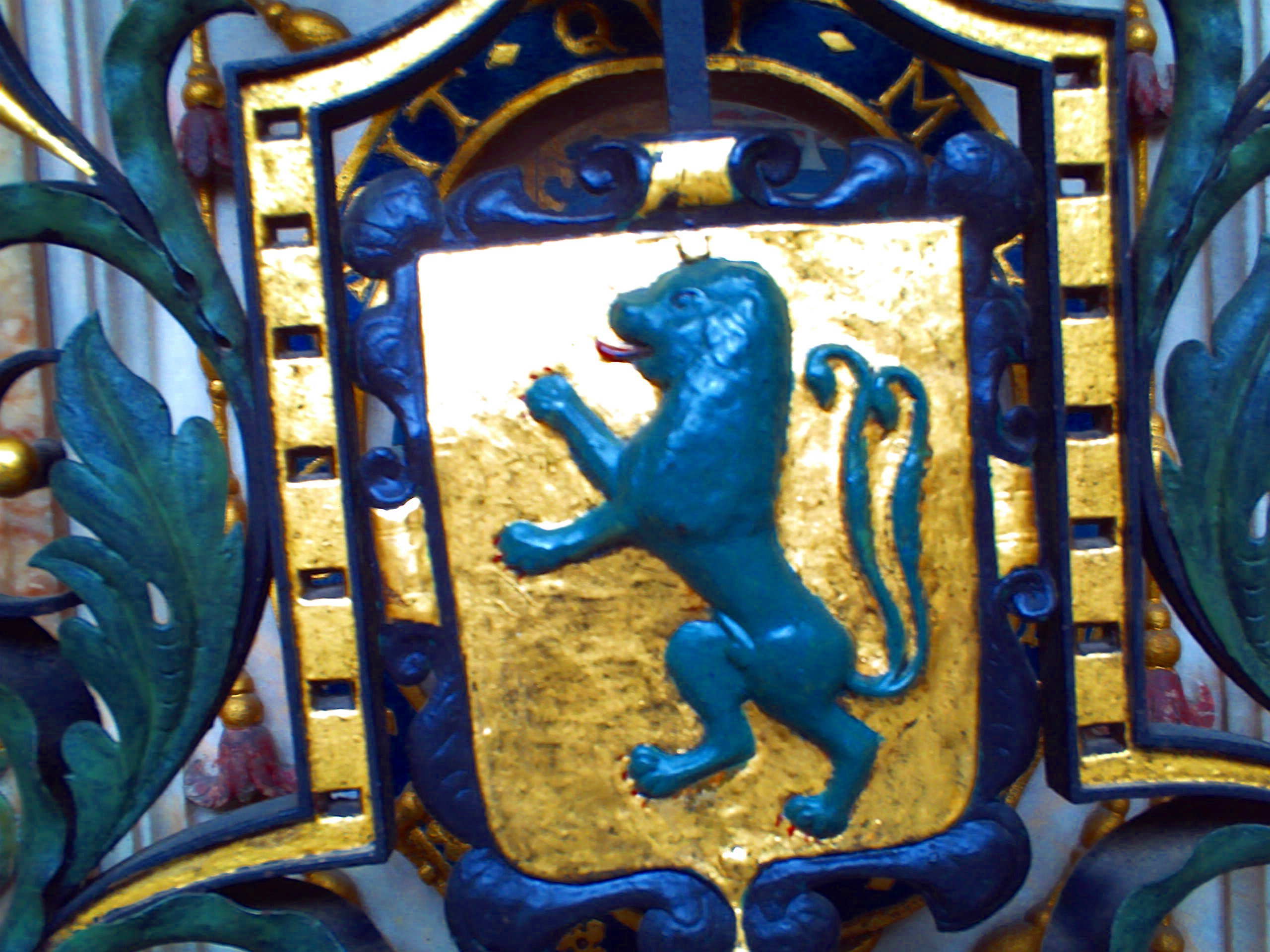
Lion rampant queue-fourché, emblem of the Dudley family, on the Dudley/Knollys tomb

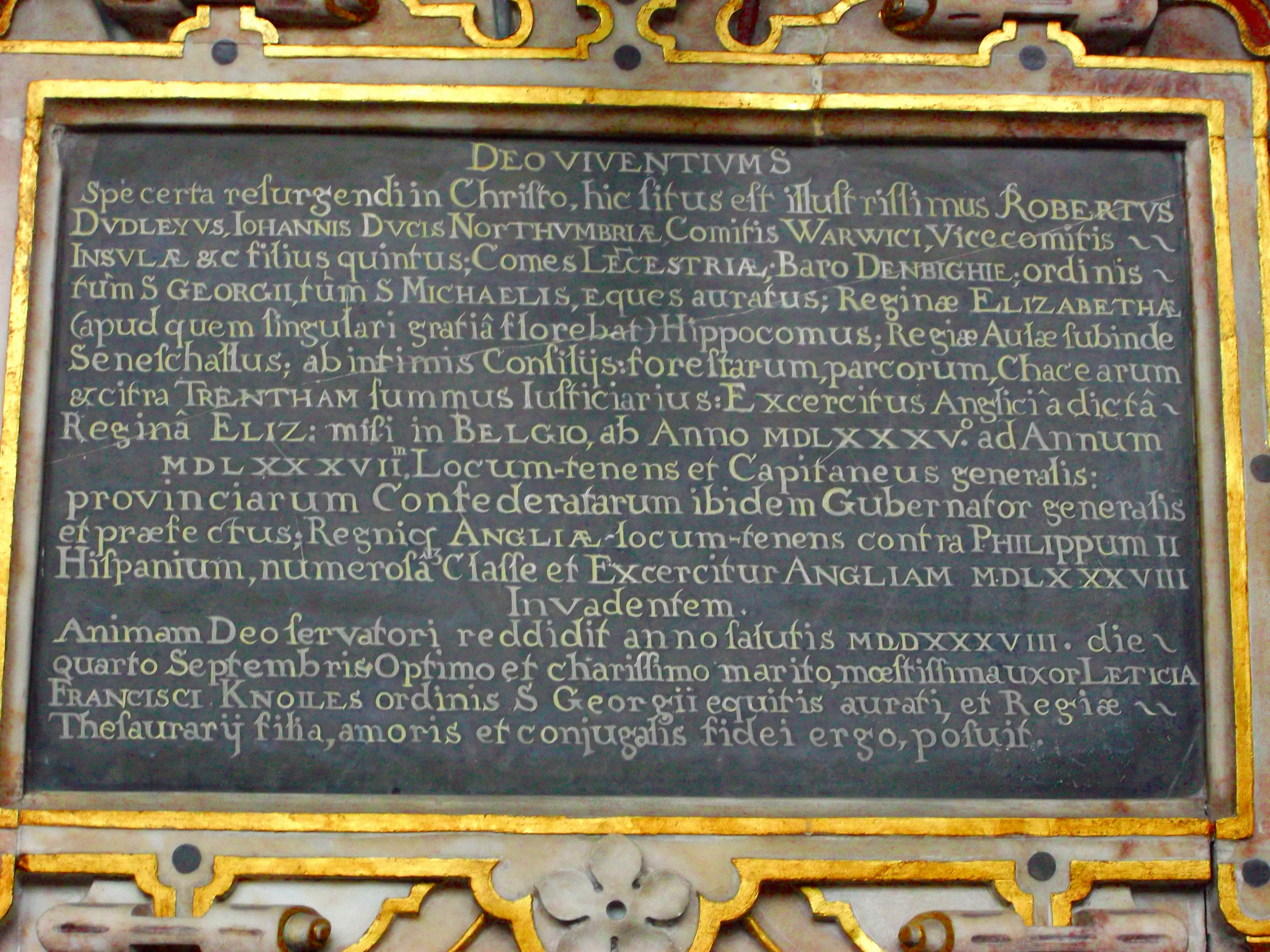
Inscription on rear panel of tomb of Robert Dudley and Lettice Knollys

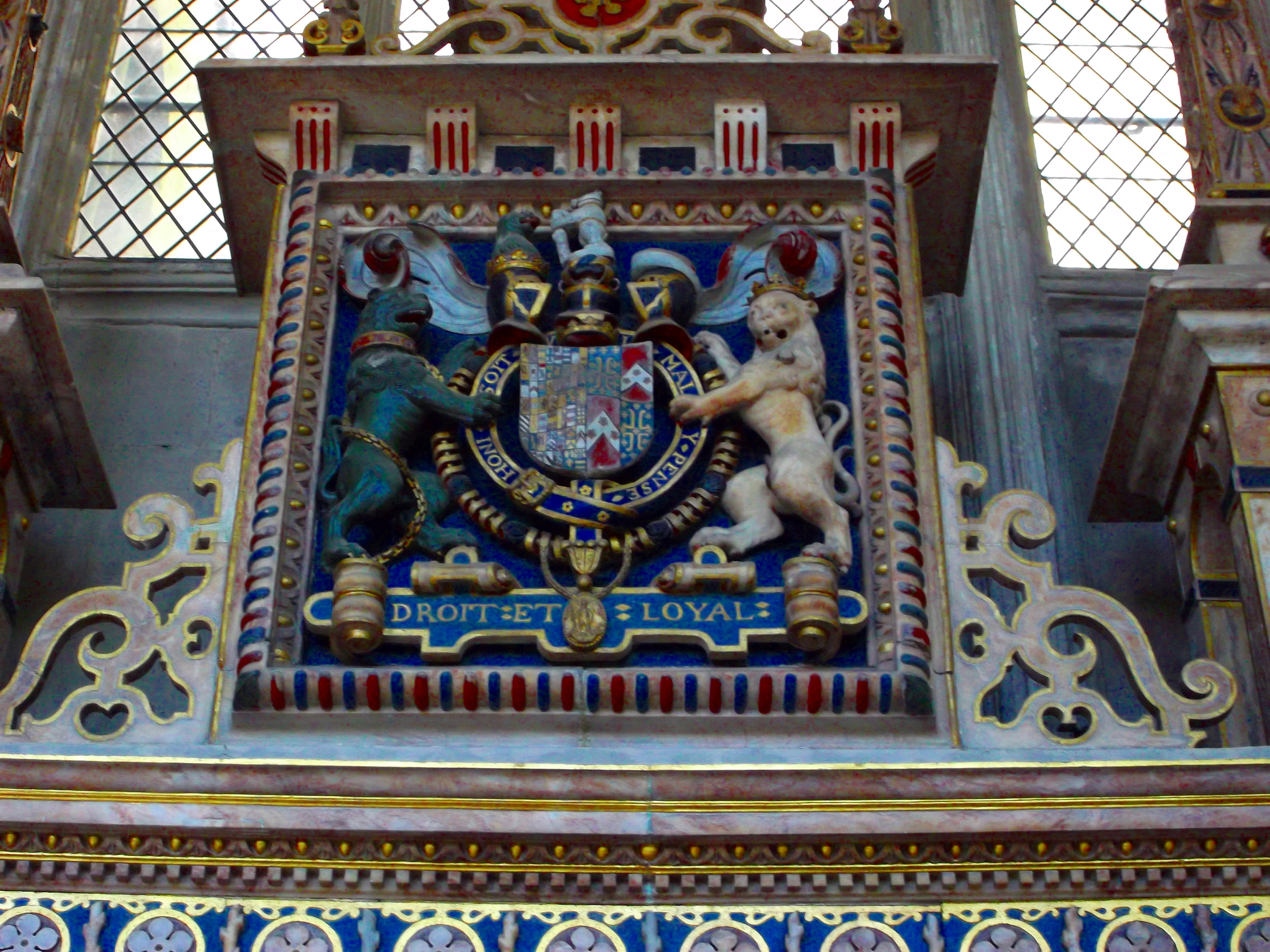
Coat of Arms of Robert Dudley, Earl of Leicester

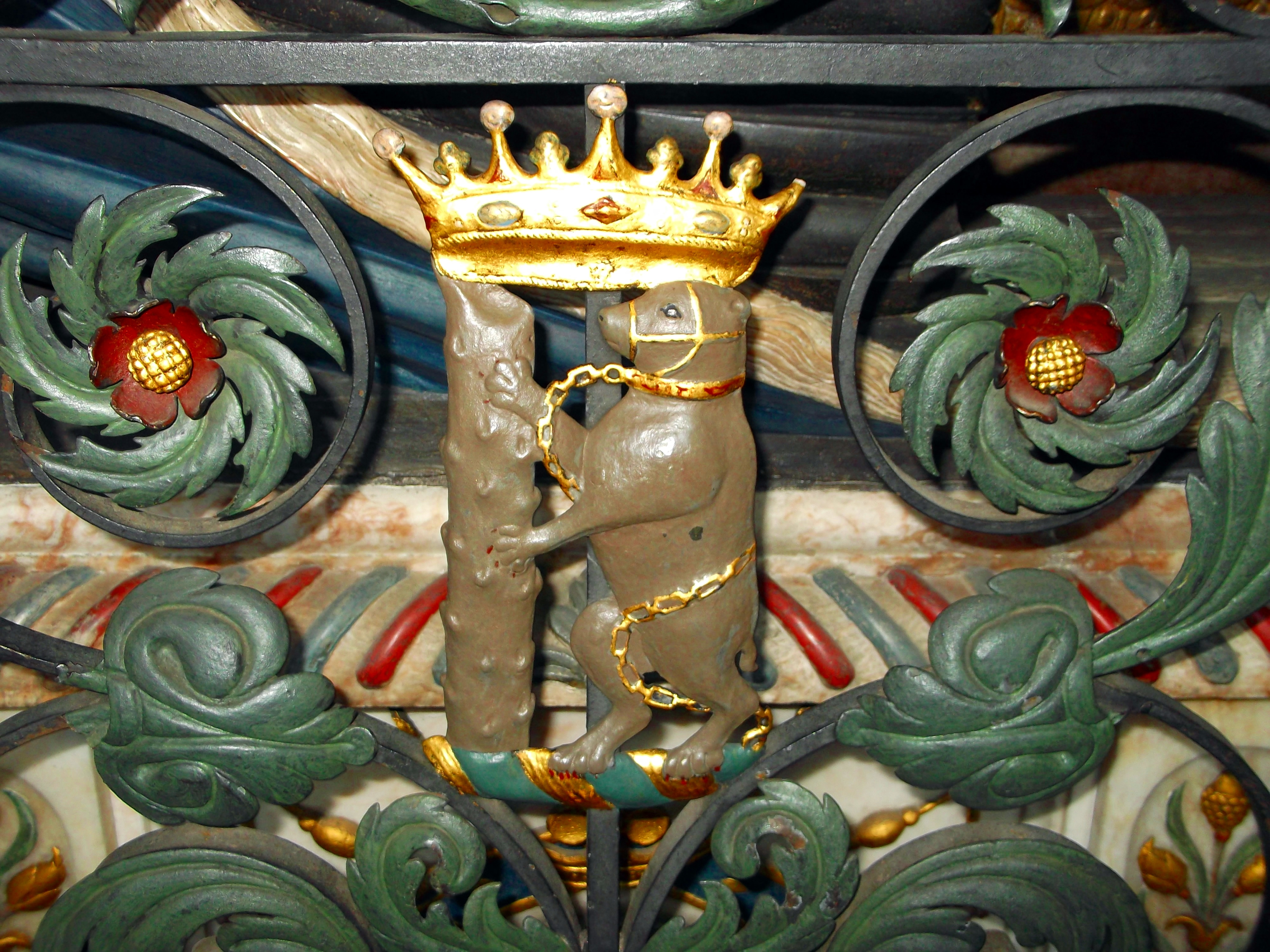
Bear and ragged staff, emblem of the earls, city and county of Warwick. Tomb of Robert Dudley and Lettice Knollys

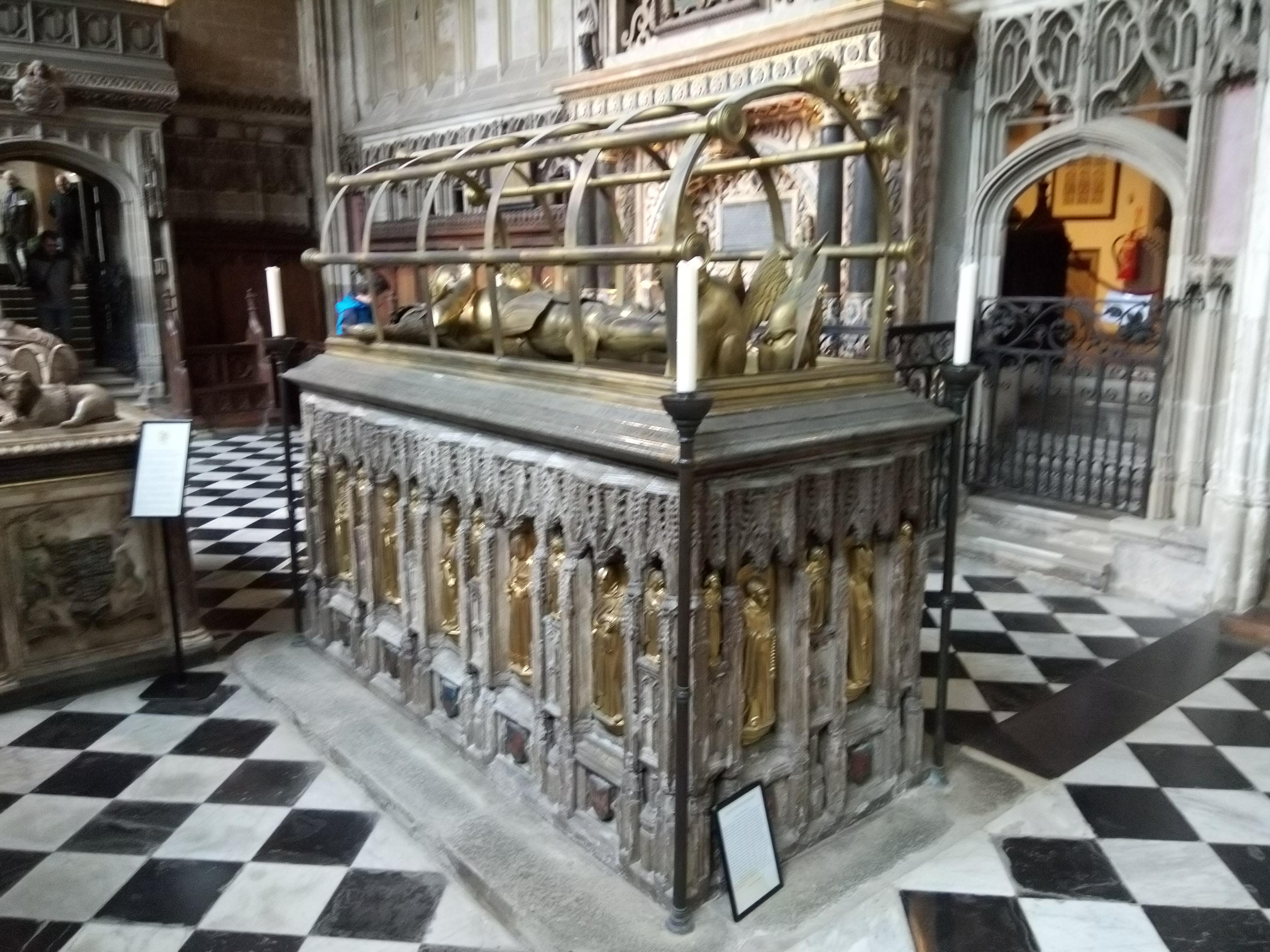
Effigy of Richard Beauchamp

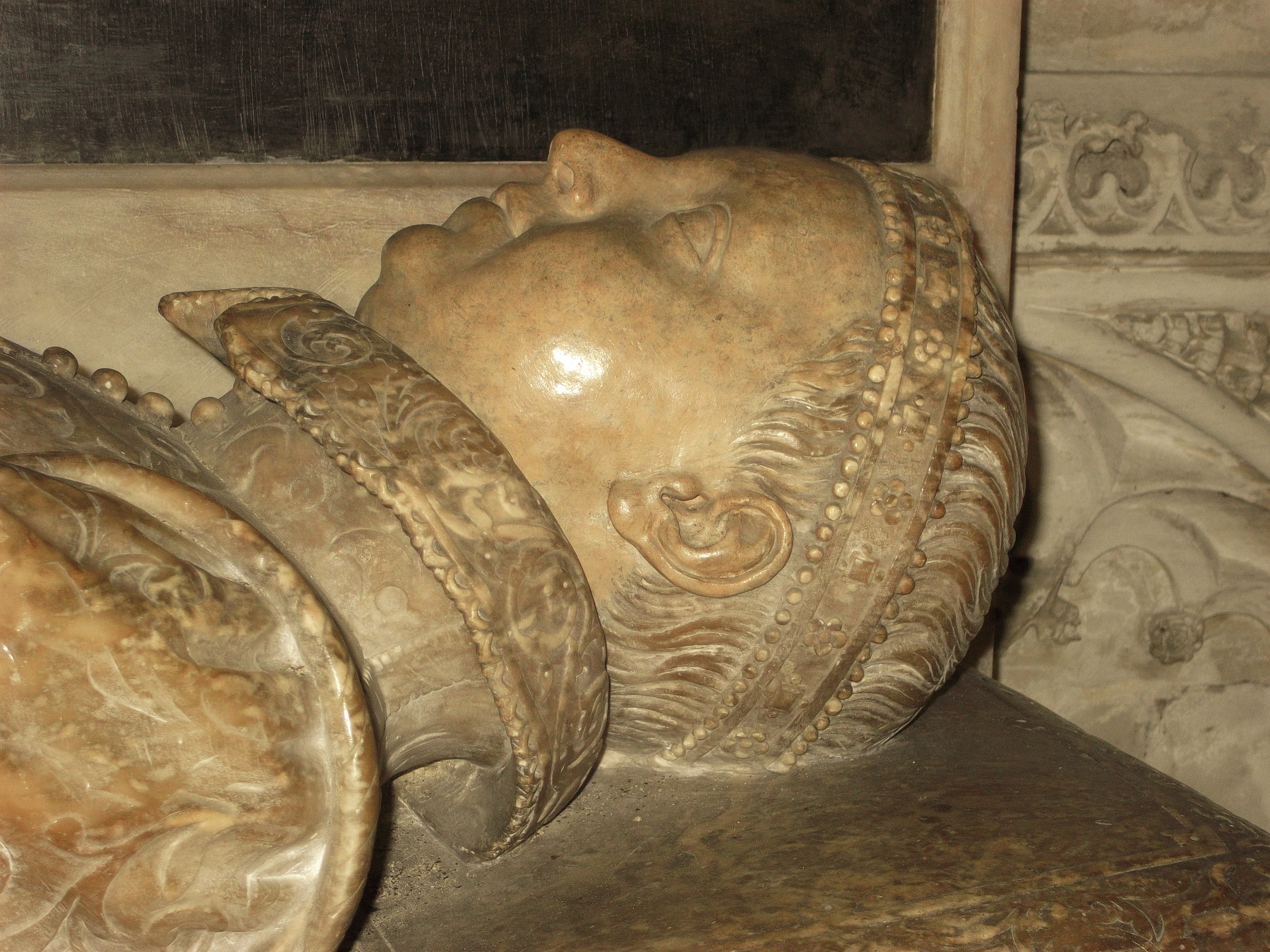
Effigy of Robert Dudley, son of Robert Dudley and Lettice Knollys, known as the "Noble Impe", on his tomb in the Beauchamp Chapel

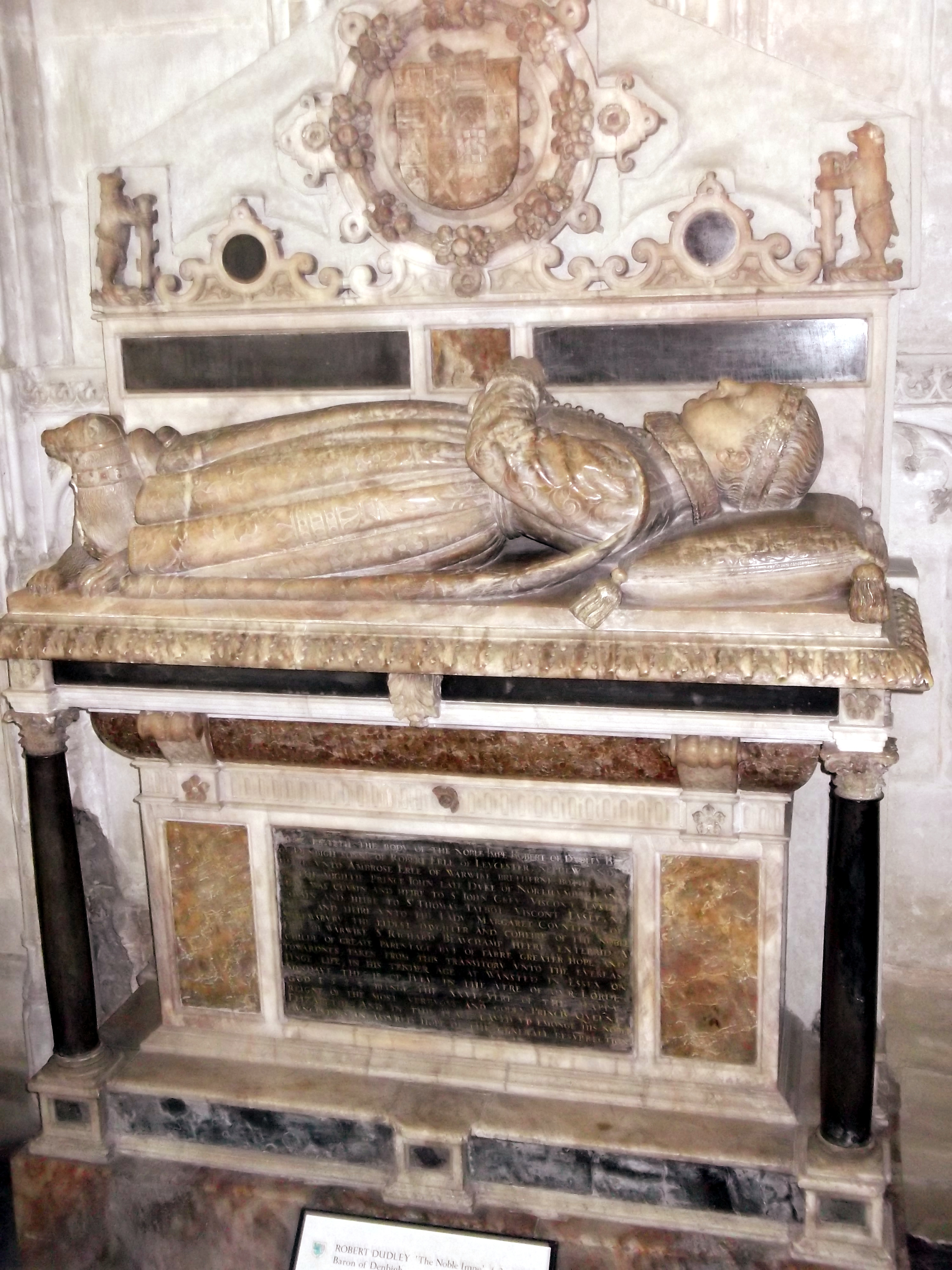
Tomb of Robert Dudley, the "Noble Impe"

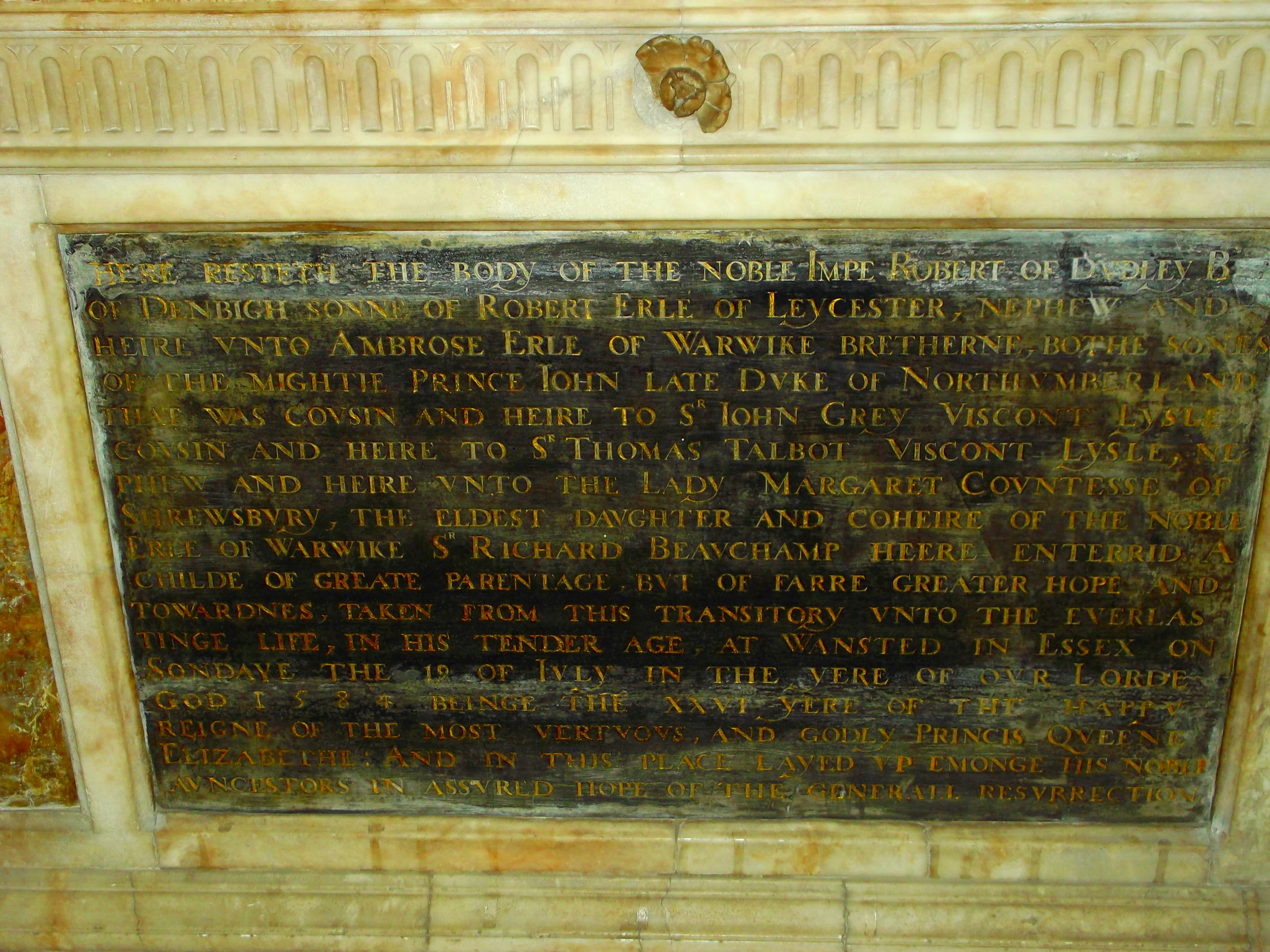
Inscription on tomb of the "Noble Impe"

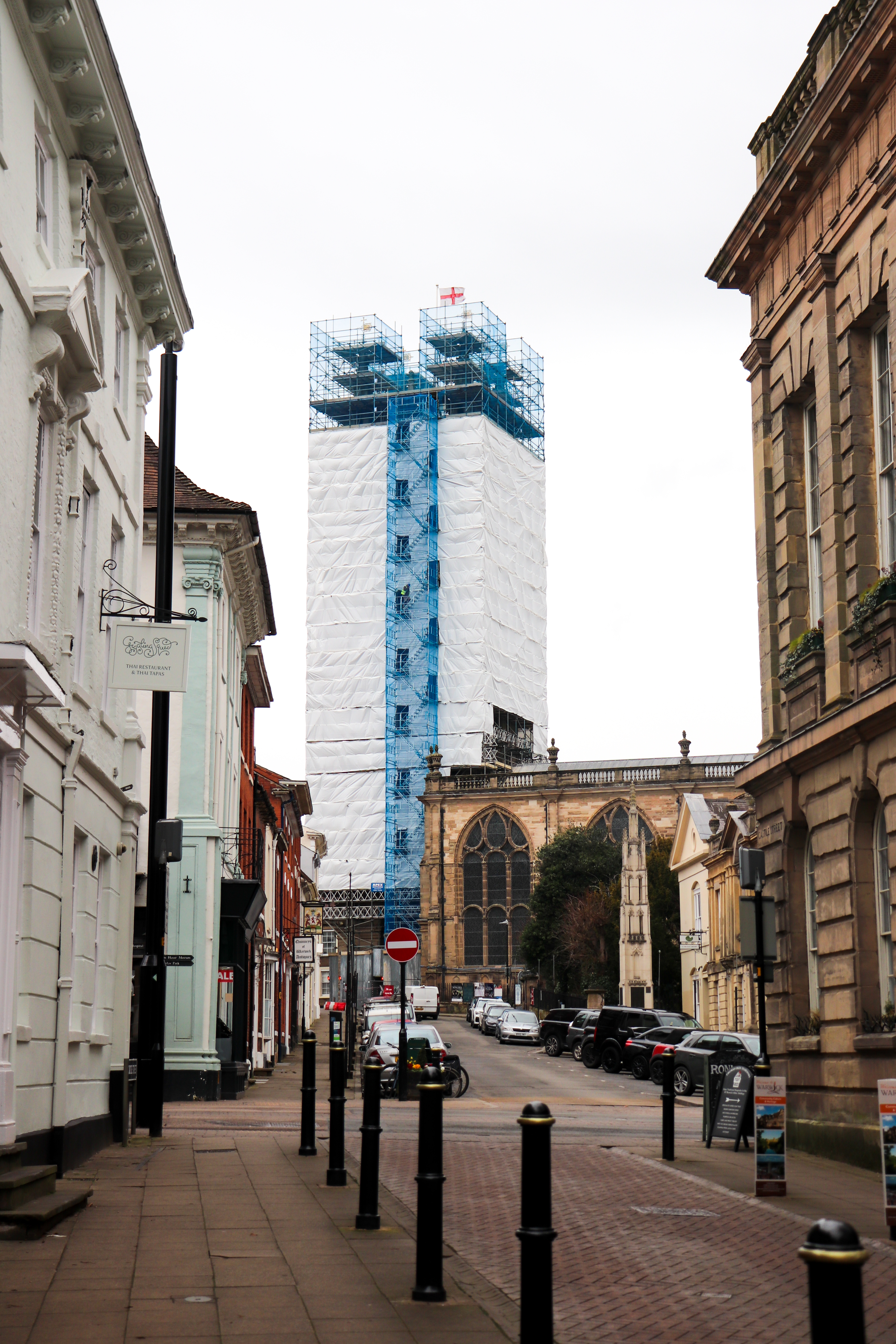
Scaffolding on the tower during maintenance works in 2023 from Castle Street
