= Charles Beckwith =

Charles Beckwith may refer to:

- Charles Beckwith (athlete) (1901–1970), British Olympic athlete
- Charles Alvin Beckwith (1929–1994), U.S. Army officer
- Charles D. Beckwith (politician) (1838–1921), American congressman
- Charles D. Beckwith (photographer) (c. 1832/3–1891), American frontier photographer
- Charles Minnigerode Beckwith (1851–1928), bishop of the Episcopal Diocese of Alabama
- John Charles Beckwith (British Army officer) (1789–1862), known as Charles Beckwith, British soldier during the Napoleonic Wars
