= Thomas Vaughan (singer) =

English singer

Thomas Vaughan (1782 – 9 January 1843) was an English singer. A tenor, he sang in prominent concerts of the day.

== Life ==
Vaughan was born in Norwich in 1782, and was a chorister of the cathedral under John Christmas Beckwith. His father died while Vaughan, still very young, was preparing to enter the musical profession, which he was enabled to do under the advice and patronage of Canon Charles Smith. In June 1799 Vaughan was elected lay-clerk of St George's Chapel, Windsor, where he attracted the notice of George III. In May 1803 he was admitted a Gentleman of the Chapel Royal, and about the same time became vicar-choral of St Paul's Cathedral and lay vicar of Westminster Abbey.

In 1811 he joined Charles Knyvett in establishing vocal subscription concerts, in opposition to the Vocal Concerts; but on the death of Samuel Harrison in 1812 the two enterprises were merged, and Vaughan became principal tenor soloist at all the prominent concerts and festivals. He sang at the Three Choirs Festivals from 1805 to 1836, and took part in the British première of Beethoven's Symphony No. 9 in 1825. For twenty-five years the public recognised in him the typical faultless singer of the English school, perfected by the study of oratorio music.

Vaughan died at a friend's house near Birmingham, on 9 January 1843, and was buried on 17 January in the west cloister of Westminster Abbey. A small tablet was erected for him in the Abbey; it reads: "Thomas Vaughan. For 40 years member of this Choir and Her Majesty's Chapel. Obit. January 9th 1843 aged 63."

== Personal life ==
He married in 1806 Miss Tennant, a soprano singer well known from 1797 in oratorio performances. After about ten years of married life they separated, and Mrs Vaughan was heard, as Mrs Tennant, at Drury Lane Theatre.
