= William Richard Bexfield =

English composer

William Richard Bexfield (27 April 1824 – 28 October 1853) was an English composer. He is known particularly for his oratorio Israel Restored, first performed two years before his early death.

== Early career ==
Bexfield was born in Norwich on 27 April 1824, the third son of Thomas Bexfield, a chair maker, and wife Anna. He entered the cathedral choir at the age of seven, and aged fourteen he studied music under the cathedral organist Zechariah Buck. He also learnt to play the violin, trumpet and trombone.

In December 1845 he became organist at St Botolph's Church, Boston, Lincolnshire, and on 16 November 1846 he graduated as BMus at New College, Oxford. His degree exercise was a canon in five parts. He lectured on music, and on the death of William Crotch he became a candidate as Heather Professor of Music at Oxford, but without success, probably on account of his youth.

In February 1848 he was selected from more than thirty candidates (adjudicated by Vincent Novello) as organist of St Helen's Church, Bishopsgate. In the following year obtained a MusDoc at Trinity College, Cambridge.

== Israel Restored ==
In 1850 Bexfield married Miss Mellington, daughter of a solicitor of Boston, Lincolnshire; they had two children. Soon after his marriage he wrote the oratorio Israel Restored. This work was produced by the Norwich Choral Society in October 1851. "... the performance of this oratorio realized all expections, and was completely successful. The spacious hall was crowded in every part...."

It was again performed at the Norwich Festival on 22 September 1852, when the soloists included Pauline Viardot, Louisa Pyne, Charlotte Sainton-Dolby, Sims Reeves, Italo Gardoni, Charles Lockey and Karl Formes. The work suffered from being forced by a local clique into injudicious rivalry with Henry Hugh Pierson's Jerusalem, which was produced on the following day. "It appears that the oratorios of Dr Bexfield and Mr Pierson were both submitted to the committee of the Norwich Festival, and there was so strong a party for each, that to put an end to dissention, both were accepted.... the attendance was one of the largest ever remembered on a first night... the merits it [Israel Restored] possesses lie by no means deep beneath the surface, while the faults in which it abounds are chiefly faults of inexperience.... Israel Restored has no pretensions to be styled a great oratorio...."

Bexfield's other published works are a set of organ fugues, a set of six songs (words by the composer), and a collection of anthems.

== Death ==
Bexfield died in Bayswater in London, on 28 October 1853, aged 29, from ulceration of the bowels. An obituary writer commented, "... when it is remembered that he was almost entirely self-taught, and that he pursued his studies under many and peculiar disadvantages, it must be allowed that no ordinary share of talent and persevering industry could have raised him to the position he had attained in his profession...."
