= Zechariah Buck =

English organist and choir director

Dr. Zechariah Buck (9 September 1798 – 5 August 1879), was an English organist and choir director who is remembered as a preeminent trainer of boys' voices.

== Early life and family ==
Born to Jeremiah Buck (a tradesman) and Sarah Astbury in Norwich, Norfolk, Buck was admitted as a chorister at Norwich Cathedral on 11 September 1807. After early training with the cathedral organist Dr. John Christmas Beckwith, he was apprenticed to the latter's son and successor, John Charles Beckwith.

Buck was married first to Sophia Hansell (1797-1830) and later to Lucy Holloway (1800-1873) and had several children, including Sir Edward Charles Buck (1840-1916), a senior official in the Indian Civil Service, and the Rev. George Peter Buck (1841-1919), Rector of Belaugh, Norfolk.

== Career ==
Buck was assistant organist of St Peter Mancroft church in Norwich from 1818 to 1821. In 1819 he succeeded John Charles Beckwith as organist of Norwich Cathedral and held the position for 58 years until his retirement in 1877.

He composed a number of anthems, chants and other pieces of Anglican church music, and was awarded the degree of Doctor of Music by the Archbishop of Canterbury in 1853.

He died at Belmont House in Newport, Essex, the home of his son, Dr. Henry John Buck.

== Legacy ==
Buck was one of the most influential teachers and choir trainers of the mid-Victorian period, whose methods led to great improvements in choral singing, especially for boys' voices. His pupils included Philip Armes, William Richard Bexfield, Bernard Farebrother and Alfred Gaul. Another renowned pupil was Arthur Henry Mann, who went on to further refine the English choral style as organist and music director of King's College, Cambridge.

A biography of Buck was published in 1899 by F. G. Kitton.

Preceded by John Charles Beckwith	Organist and Master of the Music, Norwich Cathedral; 1819 – 1877	Succeeded by Francis Edward Gladstone
