= Roger Beckwith =

Roger Beckwith may refer to:

- Sir Roger Beckwith (died 1700), 1st Beckwith baronet
- Sir Roger Beckwith (1682–1743), 2nd Beckwith baronet and High Sheriff of Yorkshire
- Wilhelm von Brincken, also known as Roger Beckwith, German diplomat and spy during World War I who went on to become an American character actor
- Roger T. Beckwith (1929–2023), English church historian and liturgist
