= Marguerite Quimby =

American politician (1896–1983)

Member of the Connecticut House of Representatives from New London
- In office 1953–1957 Serving with A. Richard Cushman (1953–1955); Laurette Beckwith (1955–1957)
- Preceded by: Thomas P. Condon; Anthony P. Turello
- Succeeded by: A. Richard Cushman; Merrill S. Dreyfus

Personal details
- Born: Marguerite Lewin; March 1, 1896 Plainfield, New Hampshire, U.S.
- Died: July 26, 1983 (aged 87) Windsor, Vermont, U.S.
- Party: Democratic
- Spouse: Arthur W. Quimby (m. 1921)
- Children: 3
- Education: Smith College

Marguerite Quimby (March 1, 1896 – July 26, 1983) was an American politician who served in the Connecticut House of Representatives from 1953 to 1957, representing the city of New London as a Democrat.

== Personal life ==
Marguerite Lewin was born on March 1, 1896, in Plainfield, New Hampshire, to Curtis and Lucy Clough Lewin. She graduated from Smith College in 1918 and married Arthur W. Quimby on October 17, 1921. She later worked at Connecticut College, where she taught mathematics from 1944 to 1961, and Arthur taught music from 1942 to 1963, including time as chairman of the music department. They had three children together.

== Political career ==
A Democrat, Quimby was first elected to the Connecticut House of Representatives in 1952, and she served two terms representing the city of New London. She served her first term alongside Republican A. Richard Cushman and the second alongside fellow Democrat Laurette Beckwith. Quimby unsuccessfully ran for reelection in 1956.

== Death ==
Quimby died on July 26, 1983, at Mount Ascutney Hospital in Windsor, Vermont. She was 87.
