= Charles D. Beckwith (photographer) =

American photographer (died 1891)

- Born: c. 1832/1833; Broome County, New York, U.S.
- Died: July 13, 1891; Murray, Idaho, U.S.
- Occupation: Photographer
- Known for: Early frontier photography

Charles D. Beckwith (c. 1832/1833 – July 13, 1891) was an early frontier photographer who operated studios in California, Utah and Idaho during the late nineteenth century.

== Early years ==
Charles D. Beckwith was born about 1832 or 1833 in Broome County, New York. At the age of sixteen, he headed west during the great gold rush of 1849, hoping to start a new life in California. He boarded a ship, the Areatus, in Boston and sailed as a passenger around Cape Horn and arrived in San Francisco in September 1849. Presumably, he tried his hand at gold mining but later turned to other work to support himself.

By 1858, Beckwith opened a daguerreian gallery in Yreka, California. He reportedly also did some work in Oregon and then opened a studio briefly in Crescent City, California. In June 1859, he returned to Yreka where he reopened his gallery, offering to produce portraits as daguerreotypes, ambrotypes and melainotypes, along with "all the latest style of pictures."

== Civil War ==
With the outbreak of the American Civil War, the governor of California was called upon to raise volunteer regiments to fight back east and to guard the Overland Trail. Recruitment posters sprouted up throughout the state as newly appointed officers struggled to find enough willing volunteers to fill the new regiments.

Beckwith heard the call and decided to enlist. In September 1861, he turned over his Yreka studio to another photographer, S. T. Feen, and headed for Fort Jones outside San Francisco. On September 25, he was sworn into the service for three years and was assigned to Company M of the Second California Cavalry. For the next eight months, the regiment drilled and trained at Camp Alert near San Francisco. In December 1861, Private Beckwith was transferred to the regimental band as a Musician Third Class.

Concerned about increasing depredations along the immigrant trails through the west, several regiments of California Volunteers were assigned to Colonel Patrick Edward Connor and sent to Utah Territory despite protests about not being used to fight the Confederate Army. Beckwith was with the column that departed Camp Alert in July 1862, reaching Fort Churchill, Nevada Territory, the following month. During the march, the musician was seriously injured by his horse and in September 1862, he was transferred back to Company M. His company arrived on October 20 in Salt Lake City, Utah Territory, with Colonel Connor, where they established Camp Douglas (later renamed Fort Douglas). Beckwith's company was part of the troops sent to fight the Shoshoni in the Bear River Massacre in January 1863.

In March 1863, Private Beckwith's company, commanded by Captain George F. Price, was transferred to Fort Bridger however Beckwith was temporarily assigned to regimental headquarters and thus remained behind at Camp Douglas. By November 1863, the soldier had opened a photographic studio on the post. His advertisement in the first issue of the garrison's newspaper, the Union Vedette, advertised that he was "now prepared to take pictures, of all kinds in the daguerrean art, at prices to suit."

In May 1864, the post quartermaster at Camp Douglas received instructions to submit a map of the post, together with descriptions of each of the buildings. Five months later, Gatley submitted his detailed map together with seven photographs, the earliest known images of Camp Douglas. While the photographer was not mentioned by name in the report, these views were very likely the work of Private Charles Beckwith. If so, they represent the only surviving photographs from this period of his photographic career.

Private Beckwith remained at Camp Douglas until he was mustered out of the service on October 4, 1864, having completed his three-year enlistment.

== Later career ==
After his discharge from the Army, Beckwith initially returned home to New York but then came back to Salt Lake City two years later. In March 1867, he moved to Montana where he worked as a prospector, a house painter and finally as a bartender. In January 1886, Beckwith located in Littlefield, Idaho, and again took up his camera as a commercial photographer. He applied for a pension for his army service and by 1890, records reveal that his health had deteriorated to such a degree that he was no longer able to work. Beckwith finally moved to Murray, Idaho, where he died on July 13, 1891.
