= John Christmas Beckwith =

English organist and composer

John Christmas Beckwith (25 December 1759 – 3 June 1809) was an English organist and composer.

== Life ==
Beckwith was born in Norwich on 25 December 1759, son of Edward Beckwith (1734–1793). His father and uncle were lay clerks at Norwich Cathedral. He was for many years pupil and assistant successively of the organist and composer William Hayes, and his son Philip Hayes, at Magdalen College, Oxford.

As an organist he took very high rank in his day. He had many pupils, including the organist Zechariah Buck, the composer Stephen Codman, the singer Thomas Vaughan and the writer on music Edward Taylor, who said of him: "I have never heard Dr. Beckwith's equal upon the organ either in this county or in Germany. … Neither is this my opinion only, but that of every competent judge who has heard him".

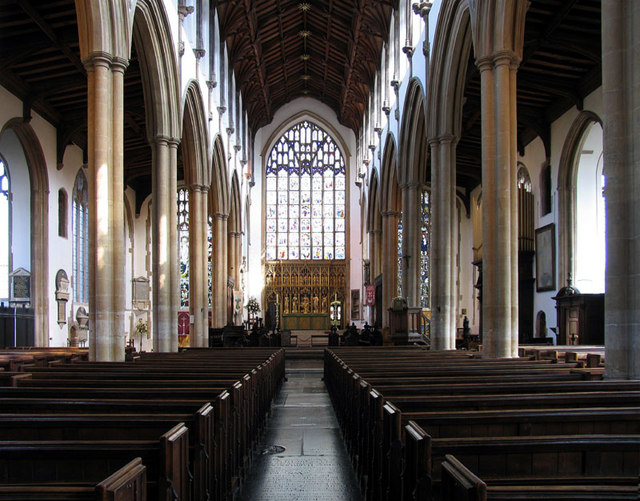
Interior of St Peter Mancroft, Norwich

In Norwich, Beckwith was much involved in "musical meetings", usually held in St Peter Mancroft; they supported charities, some of which he was associated with as a founder.

In 1794 he was appointed organist of St Peter Mancroft. He took both the Mus. Bac. and Mus. Doc. degrees at Oxford in 1803, and in 1808 succeeded Thomas Garland as organist of Norwich Cathedral.

Beckwith died of a stroke on 3 June 1809, and was buried at St Peter Mancroft.

== Family ==
He was married to Mary Elizabeth; they had three daughters and three sons. His eldest son John Charles Beckwith succeeded him as organist of Norwich Cathedral.

There is some doubt as to whether Beckwith was christened John Christmas, or whether his second name was only a nickname. In the works published by him in his lifetime he is always described as John Beckwith, but in the register of his burial the name is stated as "John Christmas Beckwith, married man, an organist of this parish", and it is by this name that he is generally known.

== Compositions ==
Beckwith's compositions are not numerous. They include:

- Six Voluntaries for Organ or Harpsichord (1780)
- Six Anthems
- The First Verse of every Psalm of David with an Ancient or Modern Chant (1808), regarded as his most important work. The chants are by composers from Tudor times to his own day.

Preceded by Thomas Garland	Organist and Master of the Music, Norwich Cathedral; 1808 – 1809	Succeeded by John Charles Beckwith
