= Beckworth =

Beckworth is a surname. Notable people named Beckworth include:

- Carter Beckworth (born 1986), American singer-songwriter
- Lindley Beckworth (1913–1984), American politician
- James Beckwourth (1798–1866), American mountain man, fur trader, and explorer
- Karen Beckworth, EastEnders character
