= Holmes Beckwith =

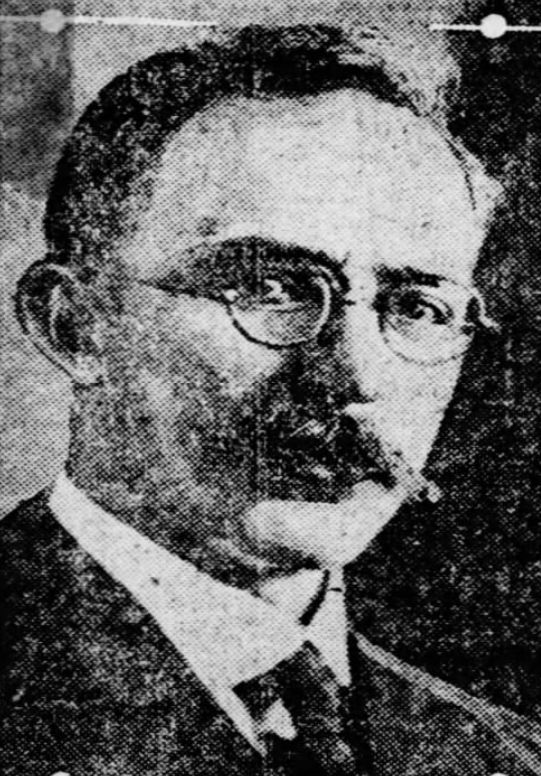
- Born: 1884; Hawaii
- Died: April 2, 1921 (aged 36–37); Syracuse, New York
- Cause of death: Self-inflicted gunshot
- Education: Columbia University
- Occupation: Academic

Holmes Beckwith (1884 – April 2, 1921) was an American political scientist and professor of finance and insurance at several universities. He shot and killed Dean J. Herman Wharton and himself at Syracuse University on April 2, 1921.

== Education and early employment ==
Beckwith was born in Hawaii to a family of ministers and missionaries, and spent his early life there and in California. He received degrees in law from the University of California and the Pacific Theological Seminary, and in 1911 completed his Ph.D. in political science at Columbia University. While at Columbia, he married Frances Robinson, the daughter of a Berkeley, California minister.

Beckwith's dissertation, German Industrial Education and its Lessons for the United States, was the result of a trip to Germany to observe industrial education practices in the summer of 1911. The dissertation argued that "Germany has had probably the largest and most fruitful experience of such education and has most to teach us." It was reprinted by the Bureau of Education (then part of the United States Department of the Interior) in 1913. Beckwith has been cited as a significant part of academic and policy debates in the period about the potential for German-style industrial education in the United States.

After completing his dissertation, he was appointed instructor in economics at Dartmouth College in the fall of 1911. He later described Dartmouth as "the toughest college in America"; he was dismissed not long after arrival, following conflicts with Dartmouth professor George R. Wicker. During World War I, he attended an officer's training camp but was discharged for physical disability, which began a long series of brief positions with a variety of institutions. In 1914, he worked for the California State Banking Commission, but was fired after complaints about his manner from the banks. In 1916 his wife, who had supported him at times during his career, left him, eventually remarrying. In the years following, he held positions at Grinnell College and the Northwestern University School of Commerce, both rather briefly. He taught for one year at Colorado College in 1920, where he became friendly with folklorist Stith Thompson, who had just begun his first academic appointment there. In his memoirs, Thompson describes Beckwith as "an extremely odd character, utterly unable to adapt to his environment." Soon after, Thompson was asked by a department head to explain to Beckwith that he would not be reappointed; Thompson reports that his colleague "received me very cordially and seemed to appreciate my interest and frankness." Shortly thereafter, Beckwith was appointed to his final position at Syracuse.

After his death, Beckwith was described as having "Socialistic beliefs," but was not active in any socialist organization.

== Murder and suicide ==
In late March 1921, Beckwith was informed by Dean Wharton that he would be dismissed; after Beckwith protested, Wharton told him that students had complained about him. Beckwith argued with Wharton twice at his house, and went to see him a final time in the dean's office on April 2, bearing a letter, later found on Wharton's desk, declaring his dismissal to be unfair, and that other professors were more popular because they were "too lax"; he also carried a military revolver and a knife. Beckwith shot Wharton five times and himself once.

After his death, a number of letters were found addressed to relatives and university administrators in Beckwith's hand; the letters complained of a life of failure and misunderstanding, apologized to relatives, and made clear that the murder was premeditated (and that Beckwith had contemplated murdering other academic administrators previously). Beckwith's uncle suggested the following day, in a statement of condolence and regret, that he did not believe his nephew "was dealing in personalities when he shot the Dean, but that the act was just his disordered expression of compensation for the wrongs and injustice he believed the world did him." Physicians and psychologists interviewed by The New York Times suggested Beckwith had an "exaggerated ego" and compared him to the notorious murderer Harry Kendall Thaw.
