= Cora Jipson Beckwith =

American zoologist, researcher and professor

- Born: March 24, 1875; Grand Rapids, Michigan
- Died: January 9, 1955 (aged 79); Washington
- Education: Michigan State University / Columbia University
- Scientific career
- Fields: zoology

Cora Jipson Beckwith (24 March 1875 - 9 January 1955) was an American zoologist who was a researcher and professor at Vassar College in New York.

== Life ==
Beckwith was born in Grand Rapids, Michigan to William Griswold Beckwith and Maria A. Jipson.

She began her Vassar College teaching career in 1900 after her graduation from Michigan State University. She continued her postgraduate studies while still teaching at Vassar College, gaining an M.A. in biology from Columbia University in New York City in 1908, and her PhD, also from Columbia, in 1914.

=== Research ===
Her cytology research primarily concerned bowfin (Amia calva) and the lateral cell lines of these bony fish. She also worked on the cytology of the germ cells of certain hydroids, and published papers describing her findings in the academic journal, Biological Bulletin.

Beckwith's teaching career at Vassar College began when she was appointed an assistant professor in 1900. She was later named a full professor and was chair of the zoology department when she retired in 1940. Later she became a Professor Emeritus, known for her teaching of histology, embryology and cytology.

=== Final years ===
After Beckwith retired from teaching, she remained at Vassar for ten years, continuing her residency in Williams Hall, where she looked after the students living there. In 1950, she moved to Washington, D.C. to live with her two sisters who were already there. She died 9 January 1955 in Washington, D.C., at the age of 79, and was buried in the family plot in Oakhill Cemetery in Grand Rapids, Michigan.

== Memberships ==
She was a life member of the Marine Biological Laboratory at Woods Hole, Massachusetts where "in her younger days she had spent many summers."

== Selected works ==
- 1907 The Early Development of the Lateral Line System of Amia Calva
- 1909 Preliminary Report on the Early History of the Egg and Embryon of Certain Hydroids
- 1914 The genesis of the plasma-structure in the egg of Hydractinia echinata
- 1920 Note on a peculiar pancreatic bladder in the cat
- 1927 The effect of the extirpation of the lens rudiment on the development of the eye in Amblystoma punctatum, with special reference to the choroid fissure
