= John Charles Beckwith (organist) =

English organist

John Charles Beckwith (1788 – 11 October 1819) was an English Organist, born in Norwich.

== Family ==
He was the son of the organist John Christmas Beckwith.

He is buried in St Peter Mancroft.

== Career ==
He was jointly

- Organist of St Peter Mancroft 1809 - 1819
- Organist of Norwich Cathedral 1809 - 1819

Preceded by John Christmas Beckwith	Organist and Master of the Music, Norwich Cathedral; 1809 – 1819	Succeeded by Zechariah Buck
