= Bernard Farebrother =

Composer

Bernard Farebrother (1846 - 1888) was an organist and composer based in Birmingham.

== Life ==
He was the son of Rev. H.W. Farebrother, vicar of Arlington in Sussex, and grandson of Charles Farebrother, Alderman of the City of London. He studied organ in Norwich with Zechariah Buck. After a career as an organist which had some notable incidents, including being sacked from his employment in Warwick, he committed suicide aged 40.

== Appointments ==
- Organist of Collegiate Church of St Mary, Warwick 1867 - 1871
- Organist of St Paul's Church, Birmingham 1873 - 1884
- Organist of Holy Trinity Church, Birchfields

== Works ==
His compositions include the following songs:

- Across the sea
- Annabel Lee
- Gentle spring
- Hymn to the Night
- Maid of Athens
- The Great God Pan

He also wrote

- Piano Sonata, Plein de Doute (1869)
- Day Dreams, a Reverie for Piano (1875)

Religious works include:

- Anthem, O Give Thanks Unto The Lord
- Te Deum and Jubilate in B flat.
- Magnificat and Nunc Dimittis in B flat.
- The Offertory Sentences (1878)
