= Beckwith, West Virginia =

Unincorporated community in West Virginia, United States

- Unincorporated community
- Location within West Virginia Location within the United States
- Coordinates: 38°05′52″N 81°09′12″W
- Country: United States
- State: West Virginia
- County: Fayette
- Elevation: 1,191 ft (363 m)
- Time zone: UTC-5 (Eastern (EST))
  - Summer (DST): UTC-4 (EDT)
- Area codes: 304 & 681
- GNIS feature ID: 1549584

Beckwith is an unincorporated community in Fayette County, West Virginia, United States. Beckwith is located on West Virginia Route 16 and Laurel Creek, 4.1 miles (6.6 km) northwest of Fayetteville. Beckwith had a post office, which closed on October 3, 1998. The community has the name of P. D. Beckwith.
