= Laurette Beckwith =

American politician (1896–1958)

Member of the Connecticut House of Representatives from New London
- In office 1955–1957 Serving with Marguerite Quimby
- Preceded by: Marguerite Quimby; A. Richard Cushman
- Succeeded by: Merrill S. Dreyfus; A. Richard Cushman

Personal details
- Born: Laurette Josephine Gilmore; March 19, 1896 New London, Connecticut, U.S.
- Died: September 18, 1958 (aged 62) New London, Connecticut, U.S.
- Party: Democratic
- Spouse: Arthur M. Beckwith (m. 1917; died 1940)
- Children: 5

Laurette Josephine Beckwith (March 19, 1896 – September 18, 1958) was an American politician who served in the Connecticut House of Representatives from 1955 to 1957, representing the city of New London as a Democrat.

== Personal life ==
Laurette Josephine Gilmore was born on March 19, 1896, in New London, Connecticut, to George H. and Mary Connell Gilmore. She graduated from St. Mary's Parochial School and the Williams Memorial Institute, and in 1917, she married Arthur M. Beckwith. They had five children together. Arthur served in the 37th Infantry Division for two and a half years during World War I, including one year in France. He died on October 17, 1940, of "a malady believed to have had its inception in his war experiences abroad."

== Political career ==
A Democrat, Beckwith was elected to the Connecticut House of Representatives in 1955 and served one term representing the city of New London alongside fellow Democrat Marguerite Quimby. Beckwith and Quimby both ran for reelection in 1956, but were defeated by Republican candidates Merrill S. Dreyfus and A. Richard Cushman.

== Death ==
Beckwith died on September 18, 1958, at her home in New London. She was 62.
