= Beckwith baronets =

Extinct baronetcy in the Baronetage of England

The Beckwith Baronetcy, of Aldborough in the County of York, was a title in the Baronetage of England. It was created on 15 April 1681 for Roger Beckwith. The second Baronet was High Sheriff of Yorkshire between 1706 and 1707. The third Baronet was a merchant in Virginia and Clerk of the County of Richmond (and the grandfather of the trapper and businessman James Beckwourth). The title became either extinct or dormant on the death of the fourth Baronet.

== Beckwith baronets, of Aldborough (1681) ==
- Sir Roger Beckwith, 1st Baronet (d. 1700)
- Sir Roger Beckwith, 2nd Baronet (1682–1743)
- Sir Marmaduke Beckwith, 3rd Baronet (1687–c. 1780)
- Sir Jonathan Beckwith, 4th Baronet (died December 1796)
