= John Tillett (British Army officer) =

- Born: 4 November 1919
- Died: 14 December 2014 (aged 95)
- Military career
- Allegiance: United Kingdom
- Branch: British Army
- Service years: 1937–1969
- Rank: Colonel
- Service number: 145422
- Units: Suffolk Regiment; Oxfordshire and Buckinghamshire Light Infantry
- Conflicts: World War II; Palestine Emergency

Colonel John Maurice Arthur Tillett (4 November 1919 – 14 December 2014) was a British Army officer who had a critical role in the planning of the capture of the Caen canal and Orne river bridges on D-Day, 6 June 1944, during the Second World War. He was one of the last surviving British Army officers to have served with the 6th Airborne Division in Operation Mallard, on 6 June 1944, and in Operation Varsity, on 24 March 1945. He later commanded the Ugandan Army.

== Early life and Second World War ==
John Tillett was born in Ipswich, Suffolk, on 4 November 1919, just under a year after the end of the First World War. His father, Major A. R. Tillett, served with the Suffolk Hussars. He was educated at Ipswich School and went to Germany on a school hockey tour in 1936, where he encountered the Hitler Youth organisation, which made him an honorary member. In Germany, he saw army manoeuvres in the Harz mountains which convinced him that war was approaching and he enlisted in the 4th/5th Battalion, Suffolk Regiment, a Territorial Army (TA) unit serving as part of the 54th (East Anglian) Infantry Division, in 1937.

However, Tillett was commissioned as a second lieutenant into the Oxfordshire and Buckinghamshire Light Infantry (Ox and Bucks) on 24 August 1940, eleven months after the Second World War began, and was given the service number of 145422. He was posted to the 2nd Battalion, Ox and Bucks (also known as the 52nd), which had recently returned from India. The battalion formed part of the 31st Independent Brigade Group, which in December 1941 was converted into the 1st Airlanding Brigade. The brigade, comprising the 1st Battalions of the Royal Ulster Rifles and the Border Regiment and the 2nd Battalions of the South Staffordshire Regiment and Ox and Bucks, commanded by Brigadier George Hopkinson, was now part of the 1st Airborne Division, commanded by Major General Frederick Browning. The battalion was now part of the British Army's expanding airborne forces and underwent training as a glider infantry unit. Transferring from the 1st Airlanding Brigade, alongside the 1st Ulster Rifles, to help form the newly created 6th Airlanding Brigade, under Brigadier Hugh Kindersley, which itself was one of three brigades of Major General Richard Gale's 6th Airborne Division, the battalion spent many months in training for the eventual Allied invasion of Normandy, in which it would play a leading role.

=== Normandy ===
He became adjutant of the 2nd Ox and Bucks early in 1944 and was closely involved in the planning of the coup de main operation, led by Major John Howard, Officer Commanding (OC) of the battalion's D Company to capture two vital bridges: Pegasus Bridge and Horsa Bridge in the opening minutes of D-Day. On 6 June 1944, Tillett's glider, piloted by glider pilots from the Glider Pilot Regiment, landed near Ranville, Normandy, at approximately 21.00hrs, along with the rest of the battalion, as part of Operation Mallard. After holding the line on the Breville ridge and sustaining many casualties, Tillett and the 2nd Ox and Bucks in August 1944 took part in the British break-out and advance to the Seine (see 6th Airborne Division advance to the River Seine), known as Operation Paddle. The battalion, along with the rest of the 6th Airborne Division, returned to Bulford Camp, Wiltshire, in early September 1944, after three months of nearly continuous action.

=== Operation Varsity ===
In November 1944, Major Howard received serious injuries following a road traffic accident and Tillett, promoted to major, replaced him as OC of D Company. He was to lead the company in the Ardennes: the Battle of the Bulge, holding the line in the Netherlands and in Operation Varsity: the air assault landing over the River Rhine on 24 March 1945. Operation Varsity was the last major battle on the Western Front during the Second World War. The gliders carrying the 2nd Ox and Bucks, including the glider carrying Tillett and D Company HQ, landed in daylight, north of Hamminkeln, east of the River Rhine, on the north-east perimeter of the 6th Airborne Division's landing zone. The Germans met the landing gliders with ferocious fire in the air and on the ground; the 2nd Ox and Bucks lost 400 killed or injured out of a total battalion strength of 800 men. Tillett's company was reduced to 3 officers and 58 men. In the battle of the landing area his company captured and held all its objectives. He continued to lead his company in the advance across Germany to the Baltic Sea. During the advance, in woods, near Lüneburg, Tillett and his company discovered the Bergen-Belsen concentration camp. They were ordered to continue to pursue the enemy rather than investigate further; the Camp Guards having by this stage fled. At the end of the war Tillett was present at Wismar for the meeting between Field Marshal Sir Bernard Montgomery, commanding the Anglo-Canadian 21st Army Group, and his Russian counterpart Marshal Konstantin Rokossovsky, for which the 2nd Ox and Bucks provided the Guard of Honour. Tillett was mentioned in despatches for his wartime service.

== Post-war ==
In September 1945, he was posted to Palestine with the 2nd Ox and Bucks and the rest of the 6th Airborne Division (see 6th Airborne Division in Palestine) during the Palestine Emergency. He returned to England and attended the Staff College, Camberley, in 1949. Tillett served with the 1st Oxfordshire and Buckinghamshire Light Infantry, 43rd and 52nd, from 1953 at Osnabrück, West Germany. In 1955 he became an instructor in the Nuclear Weapons Tactical Wing of the School of Infantry, Warminster, Wiltshire. He witnessed the British atomic weapons tests which took place at Maralinga in South Australia; the effects of which were to subsequently cause him health problems. In 1959 Tillett became second-in-command of the 1st Green Jackets (43rd and 52nd) based at Knook Camp, near Warminster. He was later posted to Uganda and became Commanding Officer of the 1st Ugandan Rifles, formerly the 4th King's African Rifles, based in Ginja, Uganda. One of his junior officers in the battalion was Idi Amin who was later to succeed Tillett in command of the battalion. Tillett, in the rank of local brigadier, subsequently commanded the whole of the Ugandan Army. He later served in Ottawa, Canada, and at HQ Supreme Headquarters Allied Powers Europe (SHAPE). He retired from the army in 1969 and served as a retired officer mainly involved in officer recruitment for the Royal Green Jackets.

== Later life ==
Tillett became curator of the Oxfordshire and Buckinghamshire Light Infantry Museum at Slade Park Barracks, Oxford and had a key role in the development of the new Royal Green Jackets (Rifles) Museum in Winchester, Hampshire. He wrote a brief history of the Oxfordshire and Buckinghamshire Light Infantry from the regiment's origins in 1741 and 1755 to the Royal Green Jackets up to 1992. He was the last-known surviving 2nd Ox and Bucks (the 52nd) officer to have taken part in the gliderborne air assault landing on Normandy, on D-Day, 6 June 1944. Tillett organised and regularly attended the regimental commemorations of the anniversaries of the battle for Normandy at Bénouville and of the River Rhine Crossing at Hamminkeln, Germany. He was the administrator of the Darell-Brown Memorial Trust. He lived in Micheldever, Hampshire.

He married Joan Lawson in 1943 with whom he was to have two sons and a daughter.

Colonel John Tillett died on 14 December 2014, aged ninety-five.
