= John Tillett =

John Tillett may refer to

- John Tillett (British Army officer) (1919–2014)
- John Tillett (impresario), British concert manager, founder of Ibbs and Tillett
