= Andrew Martin (British Army officer) =

British Army officer (1914–1993)

Colonel Sir Robert Andrew St George Martin KCVO OBE (23 April 1914 – 13 December 1993) was a British Army officer who was Lord Lieutenant of Leicestershire from 1965 to 1989.

Robert Andrew St George Martin was educated at Eton and at the Royal Military College, Sandhurst. He was commissioned into the Oxfordshire and Buckinghamshire Light Infantry in August 1934. He was aide-de-camp to the Governor General of South Africa from 1938 to 1940.

Martin served in the Second World War with the 4th Oxfordshire and Buckinghamshire Light Infantry from 1940 to 1942 and the Royal Warwickshire Regiment from 1942 to 1944. He served in North-Western Europe with the 5th Duke of Cornwall Light Infantry during 1944 and 1945 and was mentioned in despatches. Following staff posts he served with the 1st Somerset Light Infantry from 1950 to 1952 and was Assistant Military Secretary at HQ, BAOR from 1952 to 1954. He served with the 1st Oxfordshire and Buckinghamshire Light Infantry, 43rd and 52nd during 1954 and 1955. He was Military Secretary to the Governor General of Australia Field Marshal Lord Slim from 1955 to 1957. Martin commanded the 1st Oxfordshire and Buckinghamshire Light Infantry, 43rd and 52nd and the 1st Green Jackets (43rd and 52nd) in Cyprus from 1957 to 1959. He was Brigade Colonel of the Green Jackets Brigade at Winchester, Hampshire from 1959 to 1962. He commanded Recruiting and Liaison Staff, HQ Western Command from 1962 to 1965. He retired from the army in 1965.

Martin was Lord Lieutenant of Leicestershire from 1965 to 1989. He lived in Woodhouse Eaves, near Loughborough, Leicestershire. He married Margaret Grace in 1950 with whom he had one son.

He was appointed KCVO in 1988, OBE in 1959 and MBE in 1949.
