= 1st Green Jackets (43rd and 52nd) =

- Active: 7 November 1958–1 January 1966
- Country: United Kingdom
- Branch: British Army
- Size: Regiment

The 1st Green Jackets (43rd and 52nd) was an infantry regiment of the British Army that existed from 1958 to 1966. The regiment served in the Cyprus Emergency, Brunei Revolt, Indonesia-Malaysia confrontation and West Berlin. The regiment formed part of the Green Jackets Brigade and in 1963 was redesignated as a rifle regiment.

== History ==
The regiment was formed following Duncan Sandys' 1957 Defence White Paper when the Oxfordshire and Buckinghamshire Light Infantry became the 1st Green Jackets (43rd and 52nd) on 7 November 1958. The 1st Green Jackets (43rd and 52nd) formed part of the Green Jackets Brigade which included the 2nd Green Jackets, Kings Royal Rifle Corps and the 3rd Green Jackets, Rifle Brigade. The regiment wore the Brigade's Cap badge: an Infantry bugle in the centre over a Maltese cross, a crown at the top above a scroll reading Peninsula and the badge was surrounded by a wreath. 1st Green Jackets (43rd and 52nd) wore black buttons on their uniform and kept the gorget button on officers and Warrant officers uniforms. The 1st Green Jackets (43rd and 52nd) retained the Battle honours of the 1st Oxfordshire and Buckinghamshire Light Infantry, 43rd and 52nd. The regiment's depot was at Peninsula Barracks, Winchester, Hampshire.

=== Cyprus ===
The 1st Green Jackets (43rd and 52nd), commanded by Lieutenant Colonel Andrew Martin, took part in operations against EOKA terrorists during the Cyprus Emergency. The regiment was based at Buckingham Camp at Polemidhia, near Limassol and was deployed mainly in the Limassol area. Major Peter Gerahty was second-in-command of the regiment in Cyprus. Captain, later General Sir Robert Pascoe also served with the 1st Green Jackets (43rd and 52nd) during the Cyprus Emergency. Following a farewell parade the 1st Green Jackets (43rd and 52nd) returned to the UK on HMT Dunera in May 1959.

=== United Kingdom ===
The regiment was based at Knook Camp, near Warminster, in 1959. The regiment, led by Lieutenant Colonel Michael Harbottle, was an infantry demonstration battalion from 1959 to 1962. Brigadier, later General Sir Antony Read had a key role in the planning stages for the new regiment and in its move to the Green Jackets Brigade. Major, later Colonel John Tillett was second-in-command of the regiment at Warminster. Bushfield Camp, near Winchester, was used as a temporary depot from 1961 to April 1964.

In accordance with the tradition of rifle regiments not carrying colours; in 1962 in High Wycombe, Buckinghamshire, the 1st Green Jackets (43rd and 52nd) marched the 43rd and 52nd colours for the last time. On that occasion the regiment provided a Guard of Honour for Queen Elizabeth II which was commanded by Captain Edward Jones. Major Dennis Fox was involved in the production of the 1962 film The Longest Day and members of the regiment took part as extras in the film.

=== Far East ===
In April 1962, the 1st Green Jackets (43rd and 52nd) sailed from Southampton to Penang on the troopship SS Nevasa. The regiment was the first unit to be posted to the Far East without any National Servicemen, following the end of conscription in 1961. Following deployment to the Far East the 1st Green Jackets (43rd and 52nd) took part in Jungle warfare training and small exercises.

On 9 December 1962, the 1st Green Jackets (43rd and 52nd) led by Lieutenant Colonel Tod Sweeney was deployed to Brunei on the island of Borneo after an Indonesian-backed uprising occurred. Major David Wood was second-in-command of the regiment during the Brunei Revolt. Major David Mostyn, Captain Robin Evelegh and Lieutenant Robin Letts who later served with 22 SAS, was awarded the Military Cross: Borneo 1965 and later transferred to the Australian Army, joined the Australian SAS and served in the Vietnam War, also took part in operations against the North Kalimantan National Army (TNKU). Lieutenant Colonel Tod Sweeney tasked Captain John Stevenson the battalion's transport officer and NCOs with collecting troops from Jalan Gajah and other parts of the island; many troops were out of the barracks as it was a Sunday. The regiment moved from Penang on 9 December 1962 by 19.00hrs within 6 hours notice. First driving through the night to Kuala Lumpur which they reached early the following day; the regiment then continued to Singapore and arrived there by nightfall. The regiment had been informed that they were moving to Singapore to relieve the 1st Battalion, Queen's Own Highlanders (Seaforth and Camerons). Following the 640-mile Journey 1st Green Jackets (43rd and 52nd) were then told by the Military Police to drive straight to the docks where they boarded the cruiser HMS Tiger and received orders for the regiment's deployment. The mobilisation of the regiment, move to Singapore and embarkation on HMS Tiger were all completed within 34 hours.

The ship sailed for Borneo on 11 December at 22.45hrs; sailing across the South China Sea in heavy rain. The ship had 619 troops on board however was designed for a maximum capacity of 400. The regiment took part in an opposed landing at Miri, Sarawak, south of the border with Brunei, at dawn on 12 December 1962 and also in the capture of Bekenu, 30 miles south of Miri, which commenced on 13 December 09.45hrs. 1st Green Jackets were also deployed to capture Niah, in Sarawak, approximately 40 miles south-west of Miri and towards the South China sea coast. HMS Tiger continued to Labuan where the remainder of 1st Green Jackets and vehicles disembarked. Following the capture of Bekenu and Niah, HMS Albion's helicopters were used to transport troops into positions to prevent rebels using escape routes along rivers into the hinterland. 1st Green Jackets were flown to Seria and took part in operations between Seria and Tutong. The regiment returned to Minden Barracks, Penang, in April 1963.

The regiment was redesignated as a rifle regiment in June 1963 to conform to the rest of the Green Jackets Brigade. On 24 June 1963, at Cathay cinema, Penang, members of the regiment were invited to a free showing of the film The Longest Day (1962): which included the coup de main operation by D Company, 2nd Ox and Bucks (the 52nd), to capture Pegasus Bridge and Horsa Bridge in the opening minutes of D-Day, 6 June 1944, before the main Normandy landings began. The 1st Green Jackets (43rd and 52nd) second operational tour in the Far East was from August 1963 to mid-December 1963 and troops having sailed on HMS Albion were deployed via Labuan to Brunei and Sarawak.

In January 1964, the 1st Green Jackets (43rd and 52nd) became the spearhead battalion to support the Borneo Territories and Lieutenant Colonel David House took over command of the regiment. In May 1964, the regiment was deployed for its final operational tour in the Borneo territories and was based mainly in the Kuching District of Sarawak. The regiment worked closely with the RAF who used Whirlwind and Belvedere helicopters and was deployed over 40 miles along the border with Indonesia and the regiment defended against many enemy attacks. In July 1964, the Colonel Commandant, General Sir Gerald Lathbury visited the regiment at Semengo Camp, Kuching and at the regiment's forward operating bases. The regiment returned to Penang at the end of October 1964. The 1st Green Jackets (43rd and 52nd) was the only British Army unit to complete three operational tours in the area and was deployed throughout the North Borneo and Sarawak territories. In December 1964 the regiment left Penang for the UK.

=== West Berlin ===
The regiment deployed to West Berlin in March 1965 during the Cold War with the Soviet Union. The regiment was stationed at Montgomery barracks in the district of Kladow; the Berlin Wall bordered the perimeter of the barracks. On 27 May 1965, during the first visit made by a British Monarch to Germany since 1913 Queen Elizabeth II inspected the 1st Green Jackets (43rd and 52nd), as part of the Berlin Infantry Brigade. In West Berlin, the regiment's tasks included taking its turn in guard duties at Spandau Prison; where leading Nazi war criminals were imprisoned following the Nuremberg Trials. 1st Green Jackets (43rd and 52nd) officers took their turn in commanding " The Berliner:" a British military train which went daily from West Berlin to Braunschweig and back crossing into West Berlin at Wannsee and the Journey terminated at Charlottenburg railway station. The rail Journey from West Berlin along the corridor through East Germany to West Germany and back made from 1945 to 1991 was part of the agreement on Allied rights in Germany following the Second World War.

In September 1965, Lieutenant Colonel, later Brigadier Oliver Pratt, who had been commissioned into the Rifle Brigade at the end of the Second World War took over command of the regiment. Following his commission into the Rifle Brigade he later transferred to the Oxford and Bucks Light Infantry. He had been second-in-command of the 2nd Green Jackets, Kings Royal Rifle Corps prior to taking over command of the regiment. Lieutenant Colonel Oliver Pratt was to be the last Commanding Officer of the 1st Green Jackets (43rd and 52nd) and the first Commanding Officer of the 1st Battalion The Royal Green Jackets.

On 1 January 1966, whilst in West Berlin, the regiment amalgamated with the two other regiments of the Green Jackets Brigade to form the three battalion Royal Green Jackets, the 1st Green Jackets (43rd and 52nd) becoming the 1st Battalion The Royal Green Jackets.

On 25 July 1992 the battalion was disbanded at Osnabrück. The 2nd Battalion, Royal Green Jackets based at Omagh was renamed the 1st Battalion and the 3rd Battalion based at Dover was renamed the 2nd Battalion. On 1 February 2007, the 1st Battalion The Royal Green Jackets became the 2nd Battalion, The Rifles.

== Regimental museum ==
The regimental collection is held by the Royal Green Jackets (Rifles) Museum which is based at Peninsula Barracks in Winchester.

== Colonel Commandants ==
- Major General Sir John Winterton 1958-1960
- General Sir Gerald Lathbury 1961-1965

== Commanding officers ==
- Lieutenant Colonel Andrew Martin 1958-1959
- Lieutenant Colonel Michael Harbottle 1959-1962
- Lieutenant Colonel Tod Sweeney 1962-1964
- Lieutenant Colonel David House 1964-1965
- Lieutenant Colonel Oliver Pratt 1965

== Sources ==
- Allen, Charles (1990). The Savage Wars of Peace: Soldiers' Voices, 1945-89. Michael Joseph. ISBN 978-0718128821.
- Draper, Robin Anthony (2015). Redcoats to Riflemen: A short History of the Oxfordshire and Buckinghamshire County Regiment. ISBN 978-0954937034.
