= Bushfield Camp =

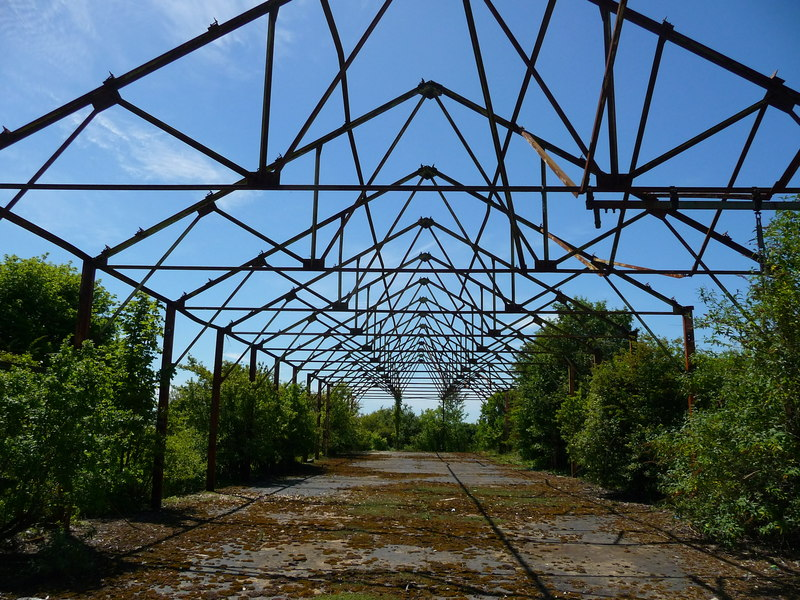
- Part of the camp in May 2011

Site information
- Type: Barracks
- Owner: Ministry of Defence
- Operator: British Army

Location
- Location within Hampshire
- Coordinates: 51.0428°N 1.3320°W

Site history
- Built: 1939
- Built for: War Office
- In use: 1939 to 1976

Garrison information
- Occupants: Depot of the 1st Green Jackets (43rd and 52nd)

Bushfield Camp was a camp of the British Army near Winchester in Hampshire. It served as the depot of the 1st Green Jackets (43rd and 52nd). The camp is now abandoned.

== History ==
The site, which had previously served as agricultural land, was requisitioned by the War Office in June 1939. During the Second World War, it was used as a transit camp: units accommodated there included the 2nd (City of London) Battalion, London Regiment (Royal Fusiliers) from October to November 1942. After after the war, it was used as accommodation by the King's Royal Rifle Corps: King George VI visited the camp and inspected the 1st Battalion King's Royal Rifle Corps in 1950.

The camp the served as the Army Records Centre in the 1950s, before becoming the temporary depot of the 1st Green Jackets (43rd and 52nd) in 1961, while refurbishment works at Peninsula Barracks got underway. After the regiment returned Peninsula Barracks in April 1964, the camp served as accommodation for troops returning from deployment during the Indonesia–Malaysia confrontation in the mid-1960s, and then became barracks for 223 Signals Squadron operating out of Flowerdown Interceptor Station in the early 1970s. It was decommissioned in 1976.
