= Tod Sweeney =

British Army officer

Henry John Sweeney
- Born: 1 June 1919; Blyth, Northumberland, England
- Died: 4 June 2001 (aged 82)
- Military career
- Allegiance: United Kingdom
- Branch: British Army
- Service years: 1942–1974
- Rank: Colonel
- Nickname: "Tod Sweeney"
- Service number: 204283
- Units: Royal Army Pay Corps; Royal Northumberland Fusiliers; Oxfordshire and Buckinghamshire Light Infantry
- Commands: 1st Green Jackets (43rd and 52nd)
- Conflicts: Second World War; Palestine Emergency
- Awards: Military Cross
- Other work: Director General of the Battersea Dogs Home

Colonel Henry John Sweeney MC (1 June 1919 – 4 June 2001), known as Tod Sweeney, was an officer of the British Army. During the Second World War he was a platoon commander in the coup de main operation, by gliderborne troops of the 2nd Battalion, Oxfordshire and Buckinghamshire Light Infantry (the 52nd), on D-Day, 6 June 1944, tasked to seize Horsa Bridge and Pegasus Bridge before the main assault on the Normandy beaches began. The following day he was awarded the Military Cross for rescuing a wounded member of his platoon while under heavy fire near Escoville. Sweeney commanded the 1st Green Jackets (43rd and 52nd) at Penang from April 1962 to January 1964; during the Brunei Revolt and Indonesia-Malaysia confrontation.

== Early life and the Second World War ==
Henry John Sweeney was born in Blyth, Northumberland, England, on 1 June 1919, and educated at Douai School, Berkshire. He entered Douai Abbey as a novice monk. At the outbreak of the Second World War in September 1939 he enlisted in the British Army's Royal Army Pay Corps, later volunteering to join the infantry. Sweeney was commissioned as a second lieutenant into the Royal Northumberland Fusiliers on 13 September 1941, and shortly afterwards transferred to the Oxfordshire and Buckinghamshire Light Infantry (OBLI), joining the 2nd (Airlanding) Battalion (the 52nd) in April 1942. At the time the battalion was assigned to the 1st Airlanding Brigade, part of the 1st Airborne Division, and converted into a glider infantry role.

In May 1943 the battalion transferred from the 1st Airborne Division to 6th Airlanding Brigade, of the newly formed 6th Airborne Division. He was a platoon commander in Major John Howard's 'D' Company coup de main that captured the Caen canal and Orne river bridges during Normandy landings on 6 June 1944. The task was to seize Bénouville bridge, now known as Pegasus Bridge, over the Caen canal and Ranville bridge, now known as Horsa Bridge, over the River Orne. Sweeney and his No. 23 platoon's objective was, with two other platoons, to capture the Ranville bridge.

On D-Day his platoon landed approximately 500 yards from Ranville bridge. On arrival at the bridge, he left one section on the west bank and crossed the bridge with the other two sections. He met up with Lieutenant Dennis Fox on the far side of the bridge and found Fox's platoon in control of the bridge and surrounding area. By 00.26 hours on D-Day both bridges had been secured. The operation to capture the bridges was portrayed in the film The Longest Day (1962).

Sweeney was awarded the Military Cross (MC) for rescuing a wounded corporal of his platoon on 7 June 1944 while under heavy fire near Escoville. Sweeney was wounded during the Battle of Normandy in July 1944 and was evacuated to England. He rejoined the 2nd Oxfordshire and Buckinghamshire Light Infantry (the 52nd) in October 1944. He served in the Ardennes and the Netherlands from December 1944 to February 1945. He served in Operation Varsity: the air assault landing over the Rhine on 24 March 1945, and took part in the advance across Germany to the Baltic Sea. In October 1945 the 2nd Battalion, Oxfordshire and Buckinghamshire Light Infantry (the 52nd) was posted to Palestine, where Sweeney served during the Palestine Emergency.

== Post Second World War ==
In 1946 Colonel Sweeney was appointed instructor at the Infantry Battle School near Haifa. He served as adjutant of the 1st Oxfordshire and Buckinghamshire Light Infantry in the Suez Canal Zone from 1951 to 1953. He commanded the Oxfordshire and Buckinghamshire Light Infantry guard of honour at the Coronation of Queen Elizabeth II on 2 June 1953. The senior warrant officer of the guard of honour was RSM, later Major John Stevenson MBE DCM.

He served in Cyprus as a company commander from 1956 to 1959 and was mentioned in dispatches. He was promoted to lieutenant colonel in 1962. Sweeney commanded the 1st Green Jackets (43rd and 52nd) at Penang from April 1962 to January 1964. The regiment was deployed to Brunei in December 1962 following an Indonesia backed uprising. He was mentioned in dispatches. He commanded the 1st Green Jackets (43rd and 52nd) in Borneo during the confrontation with Indonesia and was again mentioned in dispatches.

On 1 January 1966 the 1st Green Jackets (43rd and 52nd) became the 1st Battalion, Royal Green Jackets. He was defence advisor to the UK Mission to the United Nations in New York from 1966 to 1969. He then became head of public relations HQ BAOR, Germany. He was deputy commandant of the School of Infantry from 1971 to 1974.

Sweeney retired from the British Army in 1974. He was director general of the Battersea Dogs Home from 1974 to 1988. He was the subject of a This is Your Life programme presented by Eamonn Andrews on 20 March 1985. Guests who appeared on the programme included Katie Boyle, Richard Todd and former Oxford and Bucks Light Infantry soldiers: General Sir Antony Read, General Sir Edward Jones (British Army officer), Major Sandy Smith, Major John Stevenson and Jack 'Bill' Bailey. Sweeney was chairman of the 43rd & 52nd Old Comrades Association. In retirement he lived in Warwickshire and later in Shepton Mallet, Somerset.

Sweeney married Geraldine Follett in 1942, with whom he had two sons and three daughters. He died on 4 June 2001; a memorial service was held at Douai Abbey, Woolhampton, Berkshire.
