= Royal Green Jackets =

- Royal Green Jackets cap badge
- Active: 1 January 1966 – 1 February 2007
- Allegiance: United Kingdom
- Branch: British Army
- Type: Rifles
- Role: Light Infantry
- Size: 5 battalions
- Part of: Light Division
- Garrison/HQ: 1st Battalion – Weeton; 2nd Battalion – Bulford
- Nickname: "The Black Mafia"
- Mottos: Celer et Audax (Latin: Swift and Bold)
- March: Quick – Huntsman's Chorus/Italian Song; Double Pass – The Road to the Isles
- Anniversaries: Waterloo (18 June)

Commanders
- Last Colonel-in-Chief: Queen Elizabeth II
- Last Colonel Commandant: Lieutenant General Nick Parker

The Royal Green Jackets (RGJ) was an infantry regiment of the British Army, one of two "large regiments" within the Light Division (the other being The Light Infantry).

== History ==
The Royal Green Jackets was formed on 1 January 1966 by the amalgamation of the three separate regiments of the Green Jackets Brigade:

- 1st Green Jackets (43rd and 52nd)
- 2nd Green Jackets, the King's Royal Rifle Corps
- 3rd Green Jackets, the Rifle Brigade (Prince Consort's Own).

There were also two Territorial Army battalions made up as follows:

- 4th (V) Battalion, Royal Green Jackets – formed from the remnants of the Rangers (KRRC), London Rifle Brigade, Tower Hamlets Rifles, Queen's Westminsters, Queen Victoria's Rifles, Queen's Royal Rifles and Civil Service Rifles.
- 5th (V) Battalion, Royal Green Jackets – formed from the 4th Battalion, Oxfordshire and Buckinghamshire Light Infantry (TA) and the Buckinghamshire Battalion, Oxfordshire and Buckinghamshire Light Infantry.

During the 1970s, 1980s and onwards up until the end of "The Troubles", the battalions were deployed to various parts of Northern Ireland (Operation Banner). The 1st, 2nd and 3rd battalions were also based in West Germany, Osnabrück (1 RGJ), Minden (2 RGJ) and Celle (3 RGJ).

The regiment's greatest loss of life at one time came on 20 July 1982, when seven RGJ bandsmen were killed by a Provisional Irish Republican Army bomb while giving a public concert in Regent's Park. The bomb exploded underneath the bandstand as the bandsmen played music from Oliver! to 120 spectators.

In 1992, 1 RGJ was disbanded and 2 RGJ and 3 RGJ renumbered 1 RGJ and 2 RGJ respectively.

After the 1992 reorganisation, the unit was mostly based overseas in Dhekelia (Cyprus) and Paderborn (Germany), as well as in Northern Ireland. During the deployment of the 1st battalion to Episkopi Cantonment in Cyprus between October 1993 and May 1995, three soldiers from the regiment were arrested and subsequently convicted for the killing of a Danish tour guide.

The regiment also saw action in Bosnia and Kosovo during the Yugoslav Wars. Both battalions returned to the United Kingdom by 2002 and in 2003 the 1st Battalion served on Operation Telic 2 in Iraq.

On 24 November 2005, the Ministry of Defence announced that the regiment would be amalgamated with The Light Infantry, the Devonshire and Dorset Light Infantry and the Royal Gloucestershire, Berkshire and Wiltshire Light Infantry to form a single large regiment to be called The Rifles. The reorganisation into The Rifles took effect on 1 February 2007 with the 1st Battalion Royal Green Jackets becoming the 2nd Battalion, The Rifles and the 2nd Battalion Royal Green Jackets becoming 4th Battalion, The Rifles. The 1st Battalion The Royal Green Jackets' final operational tour was in Basra, in Iraq, on Operation Telic in 2006-07.

== Regimental museum ==
The Royal Green Jackets (Rifles) Museum is based at Peninsula Barracks in Winchester.

== Traditions ==
Their motto was Celer et Audax (Latin: "Swift and Bold"). As they were used as shock troops and marksmen, they had to get to the front line of battle as fast as was possible; as a result the RGJ marched at 140 paces per minute (at a 30" pace) whereas other regiments march at just 120.

The regiment was classed as a 'rifle' regiment, having its lineage in the regiments of foot that were equipped with the first Baker rifles. Traditionally, rifle regiments wore rifle green tunics, an early form of camouflage, instead of the red jackets worn by line infantry, hence the regimental name.

The cap badge was a Maltese Cross, which was drawn from the badges of the King's Royal Rifle Corps and The Rifle Brigade, with a combination of some of their battle honours on its arms.

== Battle honours ==
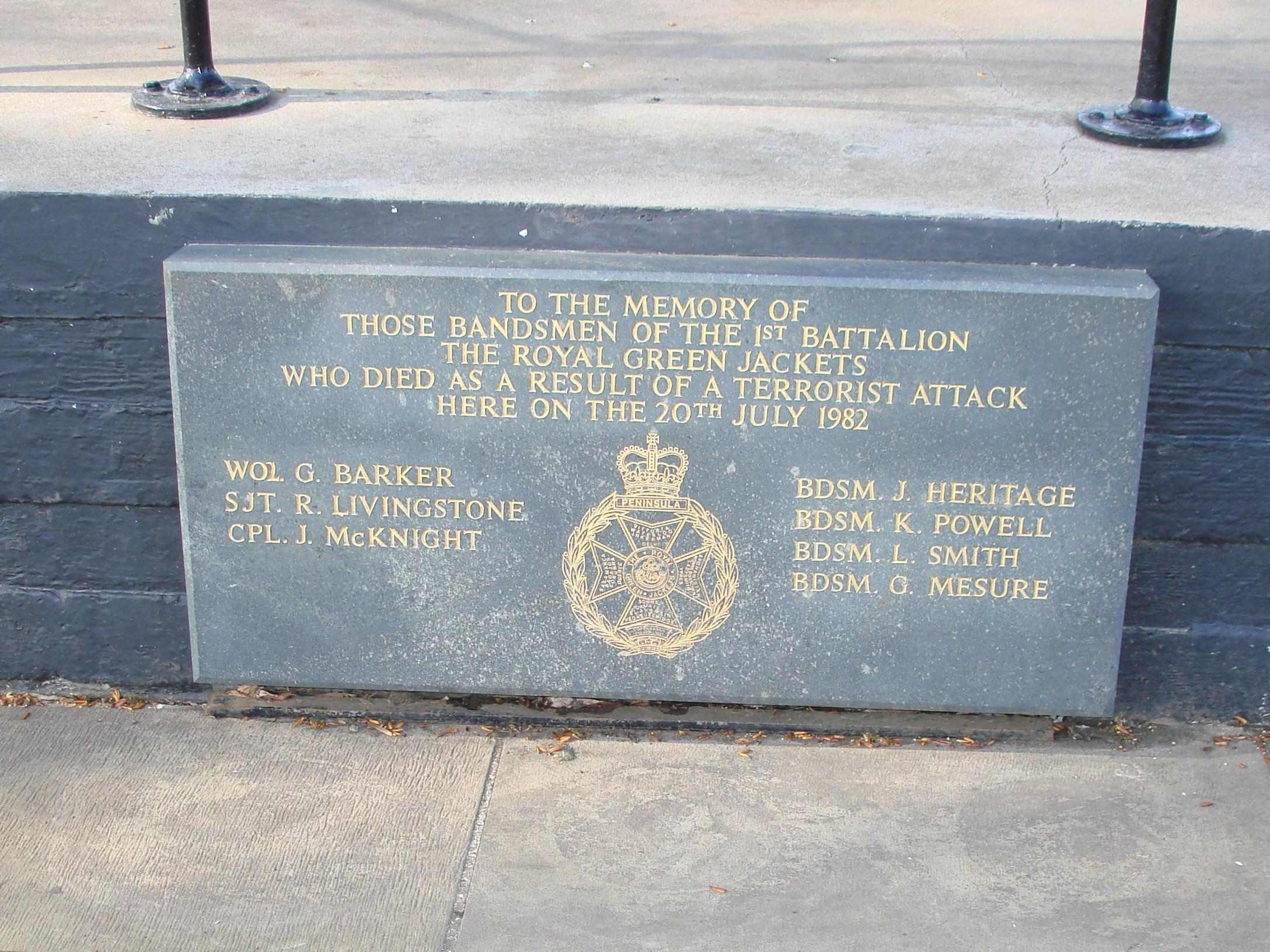
A memorial sign of the 1982 Regent's Park bombing

The battle honours are:

- Louisburg, Quebec 1759, Martinique 1762, Havannah, North America 1763–64, Mysore, Hindoostan, Martinique 1794, Copenhagen, Montevideo, RoLica, Vimiero, Corunna, Martinique 1809, Talavera, Busaco, Barrosa, Fuentes d'Onor, Albuhera, Ciudad Rodrigo, Badajoz, Salamanca, Vitoria, Pyrenees, Nivelle, Nive, Orthez, Toulouse, Peninsula, Waterloo, South Africa 1846–47, Mooltan, Goojerat, Punjab, South Africa 1851–53, Alma, lnkerman, Sevastopol, Delhi 1857, Lucknow, Taku Forts, Pekin 1860, New Zealand, Ashantee 1873–74, Au Masjid, South Africa 1879, Ahmad Khel, Kandahar 1880, Afghanistan 1878–80, Tel-el-Kebir, Egypt 1882–84, Burma 1885–87, Chitral, Khartoum, Defence of Ladysmith, Relief of Kimberley, Paardeberg, Relief of Ladysmith, South Africa 1899–1902.
- The Great War: Mons, Le Cateau, Retreat from Mons, Marne 1914, Aisne 1914, 18, Armentières 1914, Ypres 1914, 15, 17, 18, Langemarck 1914, 17, Gheluvelt, Nonne Boschen, Givenchy 1914, Neuve Chapelle, Gravenstafel, St. Julien, Frezenberg, Heliewaarde, Aubers, Festubert 1915, Hooge 1915, Loos, Mount Sorrel, Somme 1916, 18, Albert 1916, 18, Bazentin, Delville Wood, Pozières, Guillemont, Flers-Courcelette, Morval, Le Transloy, Ancre Heights, Ancre 1916, 18, Bapaume 1917, 18, Arras 1917, 18, Vimy 1917, Scarpe 1917, 18, Arleux, Messines 1917, 18, Pilckem, Menin Road, Polygon Wood, Broodseinde, Poelcappelle, Passchendaele, Cambrai 1917, 18, St. Quentin, Rosières, Avre, Villers-Bretonneux, Lys, Hazebrouck, Bailleul, Kemmel, Bethune, Drocourt Quéant, Hindenburg Line, Havrincourt, Epehy, Canal du Nord, St. Quentin Canal, Beaurevoir, Kortrijk, Selle, Valenciennes, Sambre, France and Flanders 1914–18, Piave, Vittorio Veneto, Italy 1917–18, Doiran 1917, 18, Macedonia 1915–18, Kut al Amara 1915, Ctesiphon, Defence of Kut al Amara, Tigris 1916, Khan Baghdadi, Mesopotamia 1914–18.
- Archangel 1919
- The Second World War: Defence of Escaut, Siege of Calais, Cassel, Ypres-Comines Canal, Normandy Landing, Pegasus Bridge, Villers-Bocage, Odon, Caen, Esquay, Bourguebus Ridge, Mont Pincon, Le Perier Ridge, Falaise, Antwerp, Hechtel, Nederrijn, Lower Maas, Roer, Ourthe, Rhineland, Reichswald, Kleve, Goch, Hochwald, Rhine, Ibbenbueren, Dreirwalde, Leese, Aller, North-West Europe 1940, 44–45, Egyptian Frontier 1940, Sidi Barrani, Beda Fomm, Mersa el Brega, Agedabia, Derna Aerodrome, Tobruk 1941, Sidi Rezegh 1941, Chor es Sufan, Saunnu, Gazala, Bir Hacheim, Knightsbridge, Defence of Alamein Line, Ruweisat, Fuka Airfield, Alam el Halfa, El Alamein, Capture of Haifaya Pass, Nofilia, Tebaga Gap, Enfidaville, Medjez el Bab, Kasserine, Thala, Fondouk, Fondouk Pass, El Kourzia, Djebel Kournine, Agroub el Megas, Tunis, Hamman Lif, North Africa 1940-43, Sangro, Salerno, Santa Lucia, Salerno Hills, Cardito, Teano, Monte Camino, Garigliano Crossing, Damiano, Anzio, Cassino II, Liri Valley, Melfa Crossing, Monte Rotondo, Capture of Perugia, Monte Malbe, Arezzo, Advance to Florence, Gothic Line, Coriano, Gemmano Ridge, Lamone Crossing, Orsara, Tossignano, Argenta Gap, Fossa Cembalina, Italy 1943-45, Veve, Greece 1941, 44,45, Crete, Middle East 1941, Arakan Beaches, Tamandu, Burma 1943-44.

== Alliances ==
- Australia - Melbourne University Regiment
- Australia - Sydney University Regiment
- Canada - The British Columbia Regiment (Duke of Connaught's Own)
- Canada - Princess Patricia's Canadian Light Infantry
- Canada - The Queen's Own Rifles of Canada (1966–2007)
- Canada - The Brockville Rifles
- Canada - The Royal Winnipeg Rifles
- Canada - The Royal Regina Rifles
- New Zealand - 1st Battalion, The Royal New Zealand Infantry Regiment
- New Zealand - The Hauraki Regiment
- Pakistan - Guides Infantry
- South Africa - The Durban Light Infantry
- South Africa - The Kaffrarian Rifles
- Sri Lanka - Sri Lanka Sinha Regiment
- Ghana - 1st Battalion, The Ghana Regiment
- Royal Navy - HMS Somerset (F82)

== See also ==
- Bermuda Volunteer Rifle Corps
- Pegasus Bridge
- 7 RGJ Bandsmen killed by IRA in 1982 Regent's Park Bombing
- Royal Green Jackets (Rifles) Museum

== Sources ==
- Draper, Robin Anthony (2015). Redcoats to Riflemen: A short History of the Oxfordshire and Buckinghamshire County Regiment. Royal Green Jackets Museum Trust. ISBN 978-0954937034.
