= Fraticelli of Monte Malbe =

Religious order from the 14th century

The Fraticelli of Monte Malbe (Italian: Fraticelli di Monte Malbe) were a religious order founded in the fourteenth century in Monte Malbe, near Perugia, by Francesco di Niccolò of Perugia. The order then spread and erected hermitages also at Sansepolcro and Mount Subasio, near Assisi. The order followed the Rule of St. Augustine, and was approved by the bishops of Perugia and Città di Castello. In 1363 the bishop of Perugia nominated Liberato di Simone from Sansepolcro as leader. The movement was affected by the Inquisition in 1361–1362, which ultimately led to its dissolution in the last decades of the fourteenth century.

The Fraticelli of Monte Malbe were a Mendicant order. One of their core principles was radical voluntary poverty, in contrast to the Franciscans, whom they accused of deviating from their origins and of committing simony.
