= Dennis Fox =

- Born: 1920; Johannesburg, South Africa
- Died: 1993 (aged 72–73); Harkstead, Suffolk, England
- Military career
- Allegiance: United Kingdom
- Branch: British Army
- Service years: 1941−1961
- Rank: Major
- Service number: 184578
- Unit: Oxfordshire and Buckinghamshire Light Infantry
- Conflicts: World War II
- Awards: Member of the British Empire

Major Dennis Barraclough Fox MBE (1920–1993) was an officer of the British Army. During the Second World War he led the first platoon to land at Horsa Bridge in the gliderborne 2nd Battalion, Oxfordshire and Buckinghamshire Light Infantry (the 52nd) coup de main operation, during the opening minutes of D-Day, 6 June 1944, which captured the Caen canal and Orne river bridges (Pegasus Bridge and Horsa Bridge). These bridges were considered to be critical to securing the eastern flank of the Normandy landings area.

== Early life ==
Dennis Barraclough Fox was born in Johannesburg, South Africa. Fox was commissioned into the Oxfordshire and Buckinghamshire Light Infantry in April 1941 and was posted to the 7th Ox and Bucks. He transferred to the 2nd Ox and Bucks (the 52nd) in February 1942. Originally from B Company, he joined Major John Howard's D Company as a platoon commander in April 1944.

=== Horsa bridge ===
On D-Day, 6 June 1944, Fox's No 17 platoon was one of three platoons tasked with capturing the bridge over the Orne River at Ranville, later to be known as Horsa Bridge. Fox's platoon was the first platoon to arrive at the bridge, landing less than 100 yards from the bridge at 00.20hrs on 6 June, and secured the bridge and surrounding area before Lieutenant Tod Sweeney's platoon arrived several minutes later. When Fox was asked by Sweeney how things were, he replied, " Well, so far the exercise is going fine, but I can't find any bloody umpires."[1] Fox's platoon was then ordered by Major John Howard to assist in defending the area around both bridges by forming fighting patrols and moving to the nearby village of Benouville.[2] Fox was later wounded in Normandy and evacuated to England.

=== Rhine crossing ===
He took part in Operation Varsity: the air assault landing over the River Rhine on 24 March 1945. His glider was hit by enemy fire and crash landed. He was again wounded and evacuated to England. Fox was a member of the advance party of 2nd Ox and Bucks which was sent to India in August 1945 to prepare for an airborne assault in the Far East.

== Post World War II ==
Fox served in Palestine, Cyprus, Suez Canal Zone, BAOR and Cyprus again from 1956 to 1959. He was Military Assistant to the Governor of Cyprus Sir Hugh Foot, later Lord Caradon. In 1960 he was appointed MBE in the New Year Honours. His last regiment was the 1st Green Jackets (43rd and 52nd) and he retired from the Army in September 1961. He later worked for the Independent Television Network. Fox was involved in the production of the 1962 film The Longest Day.

Major Dennis Fox MBE died in Hawstead, Suffolk.

1. D-Day The Battle for Normandy Antony Beevor (2014) page 53 ISBN 978-0-241-96897-0. 2. Beevor page 53.
