= Mendicant orders =

Type of religious lifestyle

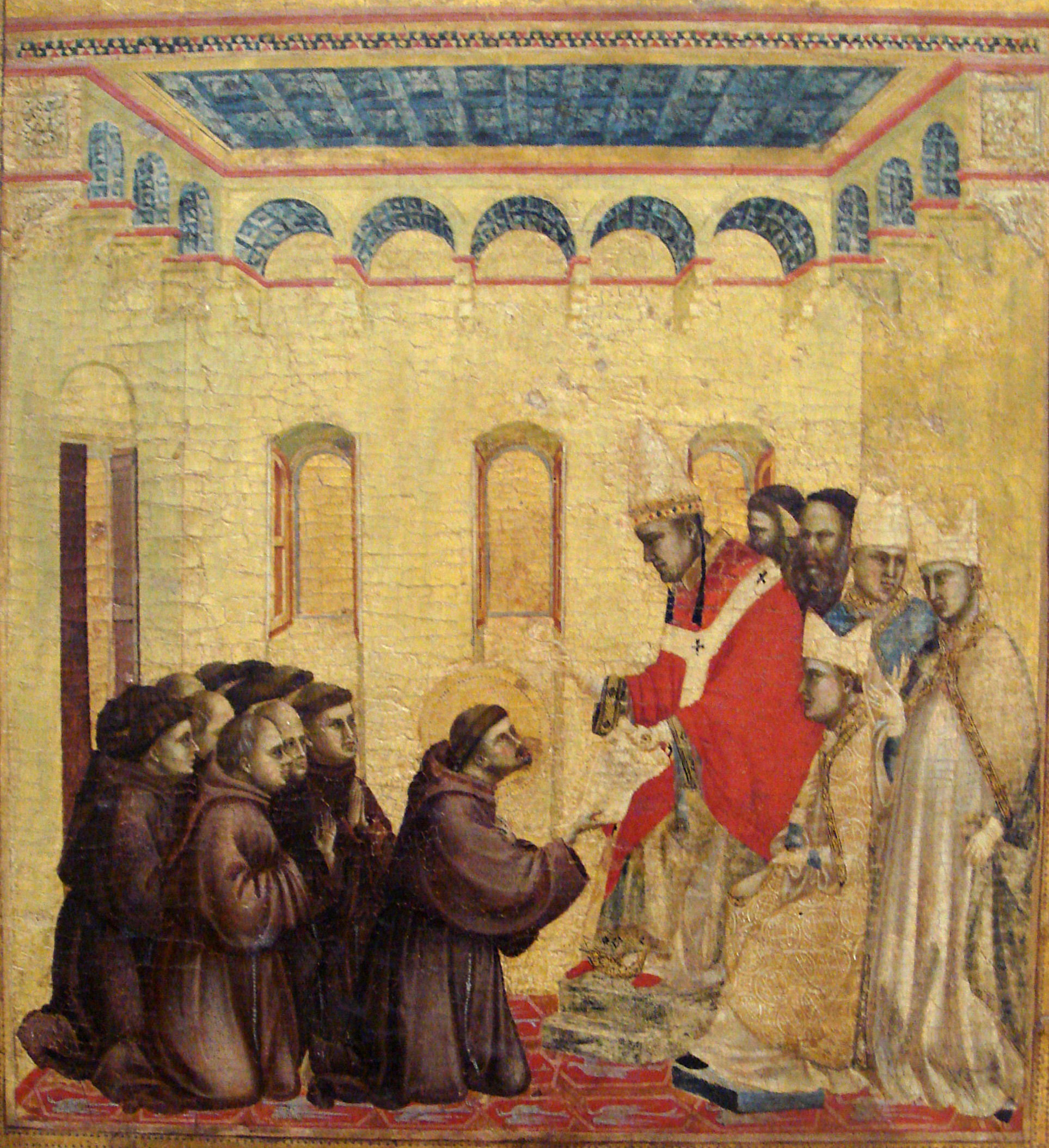
Pope Innocent III approving the statutes of the Order of the Franciscans, by Giotto

Mendicant orders are primarily certain Catholic religious orders that have vowed for their male members a lifestyle of poverty, traveling, and living in urban areas for purposes of preaching, evangelization, and ministry, especially to less wealthy individuals. At their foundation these orders rejected the previously established monastic model, which prescribed living in one stable, isolated community where members worked at a trade and owned property in common, including land, buildings and other wealth. By contrast, the mendicants avoided owning property, did not work at a trade, and embraced a poor, often itinerant lifestyle. They depended for their survival on the goodwill of the people to whom they preached. The members of these orders are not called monks but friars.

The term "mendicant" is also used with reference to some non-Christian religions to denote holy persons committed to an ascetic lifestyle, which may include members of religious orders and individual holy persons.

== The Practice of Mendicancy ==
The term “mendicant” arose to classify the new religious orders in the 13th century who tangibly practiced mendicancy as a way of ensuring their livelihood. The Gospels themselves were the inspiration for these budding orders, more precisely the discourses in which Jesus sends his disciples out on mission (Matthew 10:5-15 ; Mark 6:7-13 ; Luke 9:1-6 and 10:2-12). These orders’ primitive sources attest that Saint Francis of Assisi and Saint Dominic were not the only ones to practice mendicancy by going door to door to beg for their food, but they also recommended this practice to their first companions. They were encouraged by Pope Gregory IX in the bulls titled Quo elongati (1230) and Nimis iniqua (1231). This practice of mendicancy was applied in the first generations of the orders, but faced attacks by certain theologians from the University of Paris. Saint Bonaventure and Saint Thomas Aquinas responded by demonstrating on a theological basis the solid grounds on which this practice was based, the former in his works Apologia pauperum and De Perfectione vitae spiritualis, and the latter in the Summa Theologica (IIa-IIae, q. 187 and 188) and in Contra impugnantes Dei cultum et religionem.

== Active orders ==
The Second Council of Lyon (1274) recognised four main mendicant orders, created in the first half of the 13th century:

- Order of the Brothers of the Blessed Virgin Mary of Mount Carmel (Carmelites) first historical recorded in 1155 and their reform branch, the Discalced Carmelites (established in the 16th century)
- Order of Friars Minor (Franciscans) founded 1209
- Order of Preachers (Dominicans) founded 1216
- Order of Saint Augustine (Augustinians) founded in 1244

Other mendicant orders recognized by the Holy See today are the

- Order of the Most Blessed Trinity (Trinitarians) sometimes called the Red Friars, founded 1193
- Order of the Blessed Virgin Mary of Mercy (Mercedarians) founded 1218 and after a reform Discalced Mercedarians.
- Order of Servants of Mary (Servites) founded 1233 by the Seven Holy Men of Florence, Italy. The order was suppressed by the Second Council of Lyon on the basis of the restrictions in the decree Ne nimium of 1215; the suppression was not fully enforced and was subsequently overturned by Pope Benedict XI in his Bull, Dum levamus, of 11 February 1304.
- Order of Minims (hermits of St. Francis of Paola) founded 1436.
- Other Franciscan orders:
  - Order of Friars Minor Conventual
  - Order of Friars Minor Capuchin
- Hospitaller Order of the Brothers of Saint John of God founded in 1572 by John of God.
- Order of the Poor Clerics Secular of the Mother of God of the Pious Schools (Piarists) founded in 1617 by Joseph Calasanz.
- Order of Bethlehemite Brothers, founded in Guatemala in 1653 and suppressed in 1820. They were refounded in 1984.

Like the monastic orders, many of the mendicant orders (especially the larger ones) underwent splits and reform efforts, forming offshoots (permanent or otherwise) some of which are mentioned in the lists given above.

== Former orders ==
Former mendicant orders that are now extinct:

- Ambrosians or Fratres sancti Ambrosii ad Nemus, existed before 1378, suppressed by Pope Innocent X in 1650.
- Fraticelli of Monte Malbe, founded at Monte Malbe near Perugia, Italy, in the 14th century; by the end of the century they had dispersed.
- Hospitallers of San Hipólito (Saint Hippolytus) or Brothers of Charity of de San Hipólito were founded in Mexico and approved by Rome as a mendicant order in 1700. In the 18th century they were absorbed by the Brothers Hospitaller of Saint John of God.
- Jesuati, or Clerici apostolici Sancti Hieronymim, Apostolic clerics of Jerome, founded in 1360, suppressed by Pope Clement IX in 1668.
- Saccati or "Friars of the Sack" (Fratres Saccati), known also variously as Brothers of Penitence and perhaps identical with the Boni homines, Bonshommes or Bones-homes, whose history is obscure.
- Crutched Friars or Fratres Cruciferi (cross-bearing friars) or Crossed Friars, Crouched Friars or Croziers, named after the staff they carried which was surmounted by a crucifix, existed by 1100, suppressed by Pope Alexander VII in 1656.
- Scalzetti, founded in the 18th century, suppressed by Pope Pius XI in 1935.

Orders no longer mendicant:

- Jesuits or Society of Jesus, founded in 1540, and for a time considered a mendicant order, before being classed instead as an Order of Clerics Regular.

Orders considered heretical by the Catholic Church:

- Dulcinians

== See also ==
- Apostolic poverty
- Komusō
- Medieval Restorationism
- Mendicant monasteries in Mexico
