= Monte Malbe =

Mountain in Italy

Mount Malbe
- Monte Malbe
- Location within Umbria Location within Italy

Highest point
- Coordinates: 43°08′N 12°18′E

Geography
- Location: Perugia, Italy

Monte Malbe is a mountain in Perugia, Italy. It is mainly known for its association with a World War II battle and for being home to the Fraticelli of Monte Malbe.
