= Peninsula Barracks =

Military buildings in Winchester, Hampshire, England

- Winchester
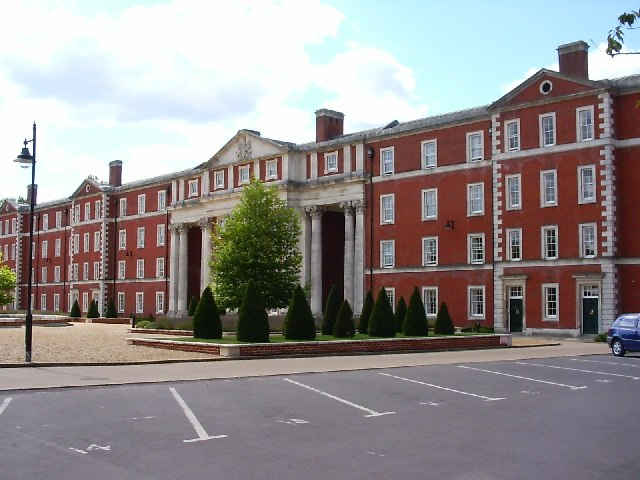
- Peninsula Barracks

Site information
- Type: Barracks
- Owner: Ministry of Defence
- Operator: British Army

Location
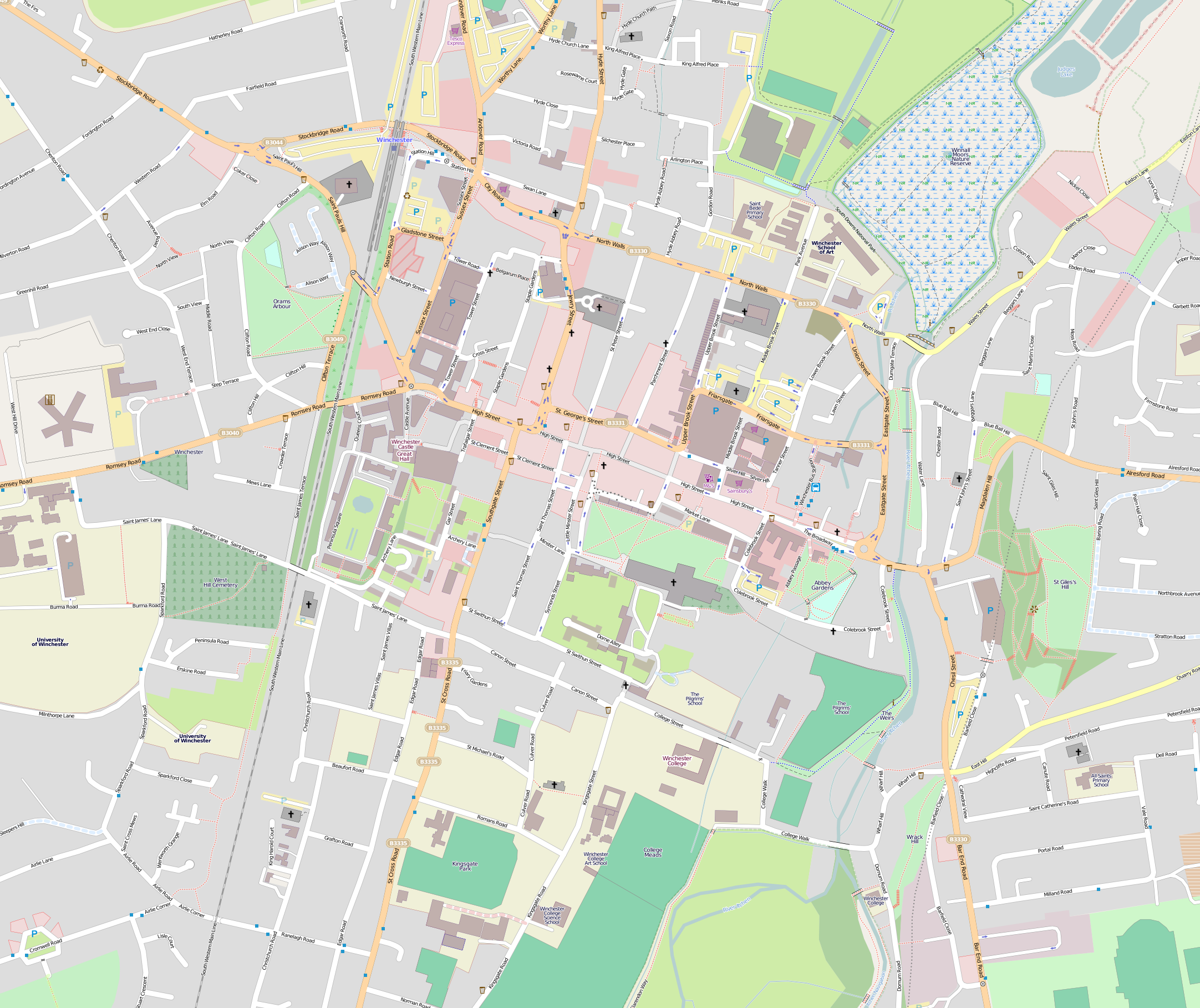
- Location within Winchester
- Coordinates: 51°03′43″N 01°19′16″W

Site history
- Built: Early 20th century
- Built for: War Office
- In use: Early 20th century–1985

The Peninsula Barracks are a group of military buildings in Winchester, Hampshire.

== History ==
The barracks, which were originally known as the Upper Barracks, Winchester, were built in the early 20th century on the site of King's House, an unfinished palace designed by Sir Christopher Wren for Charles II, which had been used for barracks from 1794 until it was destroyed by fire in 1894. Some parts of the barracks remain Grade II listed buildings in their own right including the Green Jackets Headquarters and the Royal Green Jackets (Rifles) Museum, the Gymnasium, the Main Entrance Gate Piers, the Gates and Flanking Railings and Piers, the Royal Hussars Museum (former Militia Stores), the East Block, the Guardroom, the Chapel and Schoolroom, the Mons Block, the North Block, the Weapons Training Shed and the West Block. The barracks became the depot of the King's Royal Rifle Corps and the Rifle Brigade in 1858.

The barracks went on to become the regional centre for infantry training as the Green Jackets Brigade Depot in 1960. The name of the barracks was changed from Upper Barracks, Winchester to Peninsula Barracks in 1964. The 1st Green Jackets (43rd and 52nd) returned to the barracks on 21 April 1964, from Bushfield Camp, near Winchester, where they had moved in 1961. On 22 May 1964, General Sir Gerald Lathbury, Colonel Commandant of the 1st Green Jackets (43rd and 52nd) and also Quartermaster-General to the Forces, whose responsibilities included all Army buildings, took the first passing-out parade in the rebuilt barracks. Prince Richard, Duke of Gloucester, Colonel-in-Chief, 3rd Green Jackets, The Rifle Brigade, officially opened the new barracks on 28 May 1965. The barracks closed in 1985 and military training was moved to Sir John Moore Barracks.

In 1994 the Ministry of Defence sold most of the barracks for private flats, retaining some space for Winchester's Military Museums, a complex of museums that are grouped but operated separately. The barracks also house the Regimental Headquarters of The Rifles, and the Regimental Headquarters (South) of the King's Royal Hussars.
