= King's Royal Rifle Corps =

Infantry regiment of the British Army

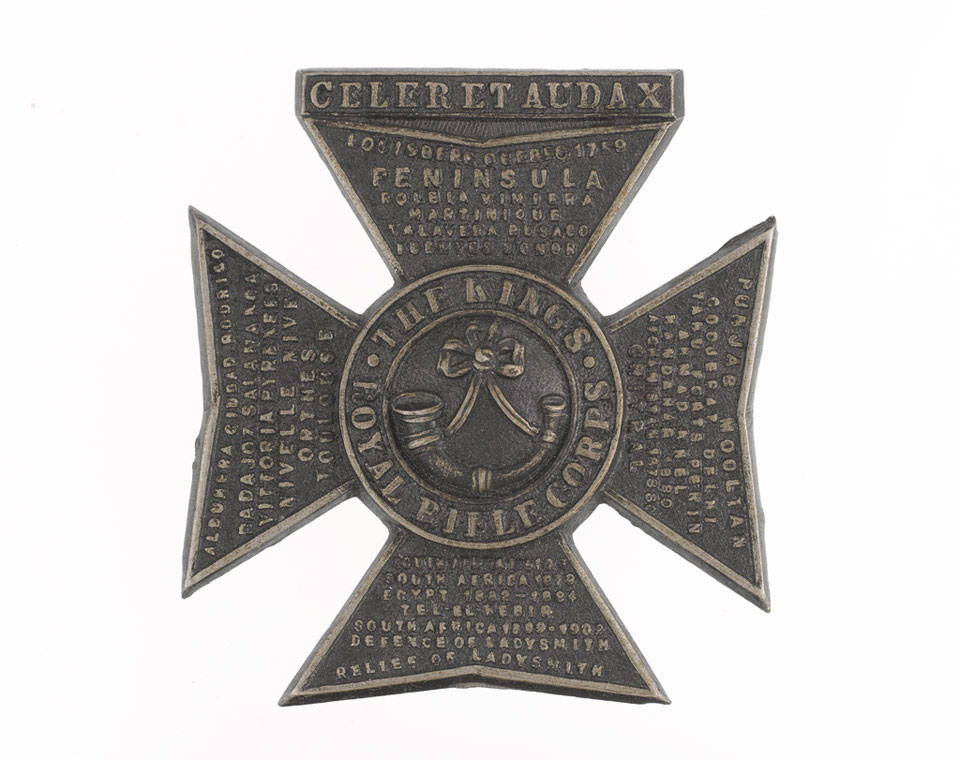
- c. 1914 regimental busby badge
- Active: 1756–1966
- Country: Great Britain; United Kingdom
- Branch: British Army
- Type: Infantry
- Role: Line infantry; Light infantry
- Garrison/HQ: Peninsula Barracks, Winchester
- Nicknames: 60th Rifles; Royal Americans; The Jaggers
- Mottos: Celer et Audax (Swift and Bold)
- March: Lützow's Wild Hunt
- Anniversaries: Christmas Day (Formation)
- Engagements: French and Indian War; American War of Independence; French Revolutionary and Napoleonic Wars; Anglo-Egyptian War; Second Boer War; First World War; Second World War

The King's Royal Rifle Corps was an infantry regiment of the British Army. It was raised in the Thirteen Colonies in 1756 as the 62nd (Royal American) Regiment of Foot for service in the French and Indian War. The regiment was unique in that it consisted in large part of Swiss, German and Dutch Protestants along with American colonists recruited for their skill in unconventional warfare in wooded terrain; the British Parliament passed a special act to allow the regiment's recruitment of foreigners. Renumbered as the 60th (Royal American) Regiment of Foot in 1757, the regiment subsequently served in the American War of Independence and French Revolutionary and Napoleonic Wars.

In 1815 the regiment was renamed the Duke of York's Own Rifle Corps before being renamed again to the "King's Royal Rifle Corps" in 1830. It served in multiple conflicts of the Victorian era and both world wars before joining the Oxfordshire and Buckinghamshire Light Infantry and Rifle Brigade (The Prince Consort's Own) in the Green Jackets Brigade in 1946. In 1966 all three regiments were formally amalgamated into a new regiment known as the Royal Green Jackets, with the King's Royal Rifle Corps becoming the regiment's second battalion.

== History ==
=== French and Indian War ===
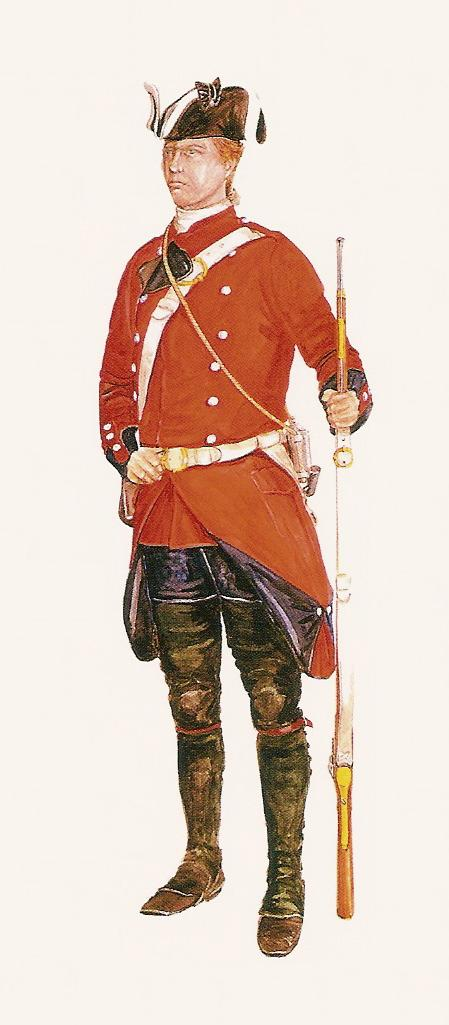
A regimental private in 1758

The King's Royal Rifle Corps was raised in the Thirteen Colonies in 1756 as the 62nd (Royal American) Regiment of Foot to defend the colonies against attack by the French and their indigenous allies. After Braddock's defeat in 1755, royal approval for a new regiment, as well as funds, were granted by parliament just before Christmas 1755 – hence the regiment's traditional birthday of Christmas Day. However, parliamentary delays meant that it was 4 March 1756 before a special act of parliament created four battalions of 1,000 men each to include foreigners for service in the Americas.

Commissions to Foreign Protestants Act 1756
- Act of Parliament
- Parliament of Great Britain
- Long title: An Act to enable His Majesty to grant Commissions to a certain Number of Foreign Protestants, who have served Abroad as Officers or Engineers, to act and rank as Officers or Engineers in America only, under certain Restrictions and Qualifications.
- Citation: 29 Geo. 2. c. 5
- Territorial extent: Great Britain

Dates
- Royal assent: 9 March 1756
- Commencement: 13 November 1755 (Note: Start of session.)
- Repealed: 15 July 1867
Other legislation
Amended by	Augmentation of 60th Regiment Act 1797
Repealed by	Statute Law Revision Act 1867
Relates to	Naturalization Act 1739; American Protestant Soldier Naturalization Act 1762

Status: Repealed

Text of statute as originally enacted

A regimental history compiled in 1879 states that, in November 1755, Parliament voted the sum of £81,000 for the purpose of raising a regiment of four battalions, each one thousand strong, for service in British North America. To provide experienced personnel, Parliament passed the Commissions to Foreign Protestants Act 1756 (29 Geo. 2. c. 5) The Earl of Loudoun, who as commander-in-chief of the Forces in North America, was appointed colonel-in-chief of the regiment. About fifty officers' commissions were given to Germans and Swiss, and none were allowed to rise above the rank of lieutenant-colonel.

According to a modern history of the regiment, the idea for creating this unique force was proposed by Jacques Prevost, a Swiss soldier and adventurer who was a friend of the Duke of Cumberland (the Duke was the King's third son and also Commander-in-Chief of the Forces). Prevost recognised the need for soldiers who understood forest warfare, unlike the regulars who were brought to America in 1755 by General Edward Braddock.

The regiment was intended to combine the characteristics of colonial units and foreign legions. Swiss and Germans skilled in unconventional warfare in wooded terrain, American colonists and volunteers from other British Army regiments were recruited. These men were Protestants, an important consideration for fighting against the predominantly Catholic French. The officers were also recruited from Europe – not from the American colonies – and consisted of British, Irish, Dutch, Swiss and Germans. It was the first time foreign officers were commissioned as British Army officers. In total, the regiment consisted of 101 officers, 240 non-commissioned officers and 4,160 enlisted men. The battalions were raised on Governors Island, New York. The regiment was renumbered the 60th (Royal American) Regiment of Foot in February 1757 when the 50th and 51st Regiments of Foot were removed from the British Army roll after their surrender at Fort Oswego.

Among the distinguished foreign officers given commissions in the regiment was Henry Bouquet, a Swiss mercenary whose forward-looking ideas on tactics, training and man-management (including the unofficial introduction of the rifle and more practical clothing suited to bush-fighting) would come to be accepted as standard in the British Army many years in the future. Bouquet was commanding officer of the 1st battalion, and with his fellow battalion commanders, worked to form units that were better suited to warfare in the forests and lakes of northeast America.

American Protestant Soldier Naturalization Act 1762
- Act of Parliament
- Parliament of Great Britain
- Long title: An Act for naturalizing such Foreign Protestants as have served, or shall serve, for the Time therein mentioned, as Officers, or Soldiers, in His Majesty's Royal American Regiment, or as Engineers in America.
- Citation: 2 Geo. 3. c. 25
- Territorial extent: Great Britain

Dates
- Royal assent: 2 June 1762
- Commencement: 3 November 1761
- Repealed: 15 July 1867
Other legislation
Repealed by	Statute Law Revision Act 1867
Relates to	Naturalization Act 1739; Commissions to Foreign Protestants Act 1756

Status: Repealed

Text of statute as originally enacted

Elements of the new regiment fought at Louisbourg in June 1758, the Cape Sable Campaign in September 1758 and Quebec in September 1759, and finally the Montreal Campaign from July to September 1760 which finally wrested Canada from France. At Quebec General James Wolfe is said to have granted the regiment the motto Celer et Audax (Swift and Bold). To reward and maintain their service and loyalty, Parliament passed the American Protestant Soldier Naturalization Act 1762 (2 Geo. 3. c. 25), which offered British naturalization to those officers, engineers and soldiers who had or would serve for two years, with certain conditions and on the model of the Plantation Act 1740.

These earlier engagements were conventional battles on the European model, but fighting during Pontiac's War in 1763 was of a very different character. The frontier war threatened the British control of North America. The new regiment at first lost several outlying garrisons such as Fort Michilimackinac, later a detachment fought under Bouquet's leadership at the victory of Bushy Run in August 1763.

In 1762, the 3rd Battalion sailed from North America to joining the Earl of Albemarle's expedition to the West Indies. The battalion was closely involved in the capture of Martinique and the successful siege and capture of Havana. It later moved to West Florida prior to England and disbandment in 1764.

The 60th was uniformed and equipped in a similar manner to other British regiments with red coats and cocked hats or grenadier caps, but on campaign, swords were replaced with hatchets, and coats and hats cut down for ease of movement in the woods.

=== American War of Independence ===
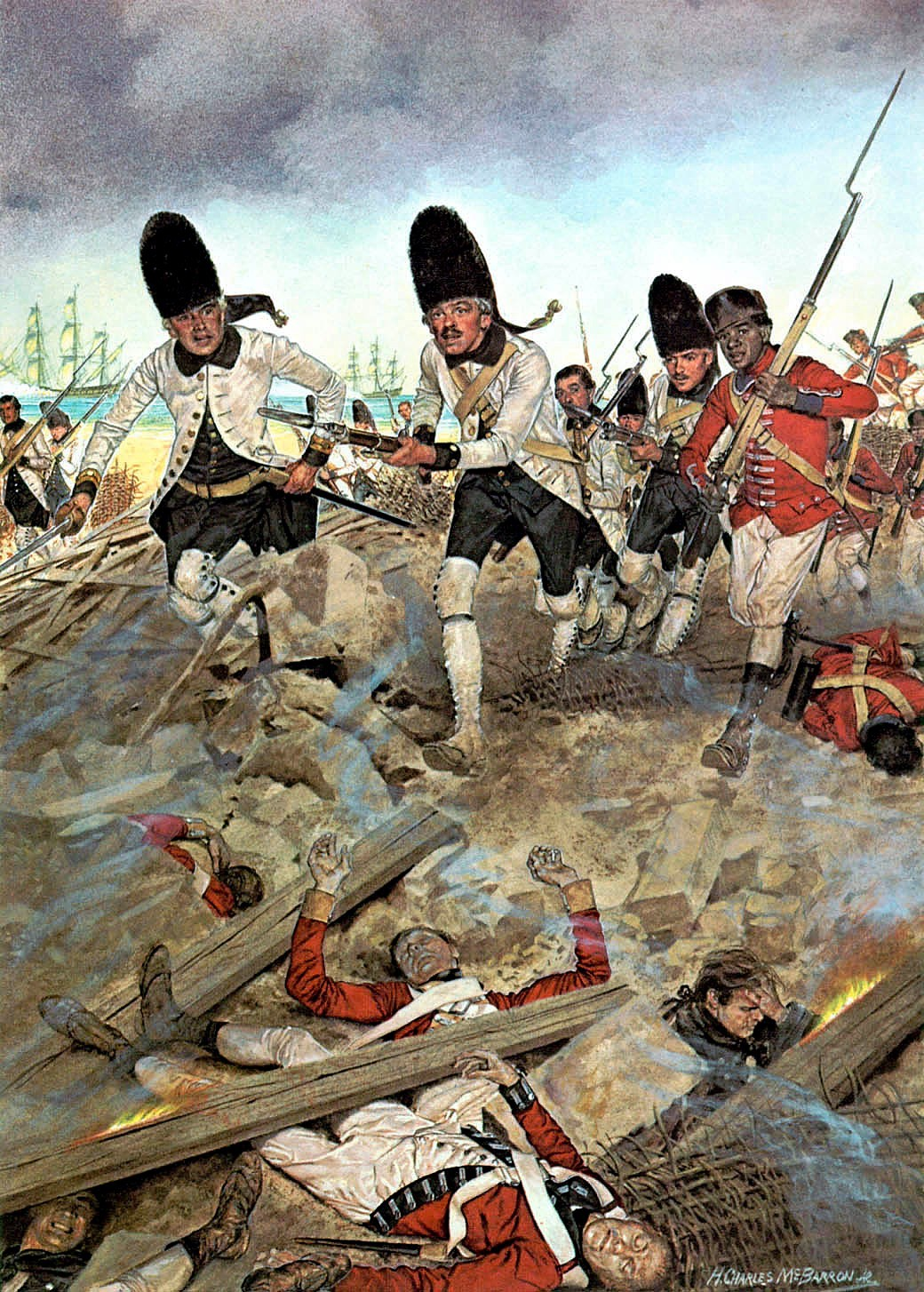
The siege of Pensacola, which the regiment fought in

Two additional battalions of the regiment (the 3rd and 4th battalions) were raised in England in 1775, principally of men recruited from England and Hanover in 1775 for service in the American War of Independence. After assembly in the Isle of Wight, both battalions were sent in 1776 to Florida where they were joined by detachments from 1st and 2nd Battalions. These battalions were deployed to Georgia and were involved in skirmishes at Sudbury in January 1779, the Battle of Brier Creek in March 1779, the Siege of Savannah in October 1779 where elements from the 4th Battalion captured the colour of the 2nd South Carolina Regiment, and at Augusta in September 1780. The 3rd battalion later took part in the British defense of the Gulf Coast. Elements of the battalion fought at the Battle at The Village and the Siege of Pensacola. The 3rd and 4th battalions were disbanded in June 1783.

=== Napoleonic Wars ===
Augmentation of 60th Regiment Act 1797
- Act of Parliament
- Parliament of Great Britain
- Long title: An act to amend an act made in the twenty-ninth year of the reign of his late majesty King George the Second, intituled, "An act to enable his Majesty to grant commissions to a certain number of foreign protestants, who have served abroad as officers or engineers, to act and rank as officers or engineers in America only, under certain restrictions and qualifications."
- Citation: 38 Geo. 3. c. 13
- Territorial extent: Great Britain

Dates
- Royal assent: 30 December 1797
- Commencement: 2 November 1797
- Repealed: 6 August 1861
Other legislation
Amends	Commissions to Foreign Protestants Act 1756
Repealed by	Statute Law Revision Act 1871

Status: Repealed

Text of statute as originally enacted

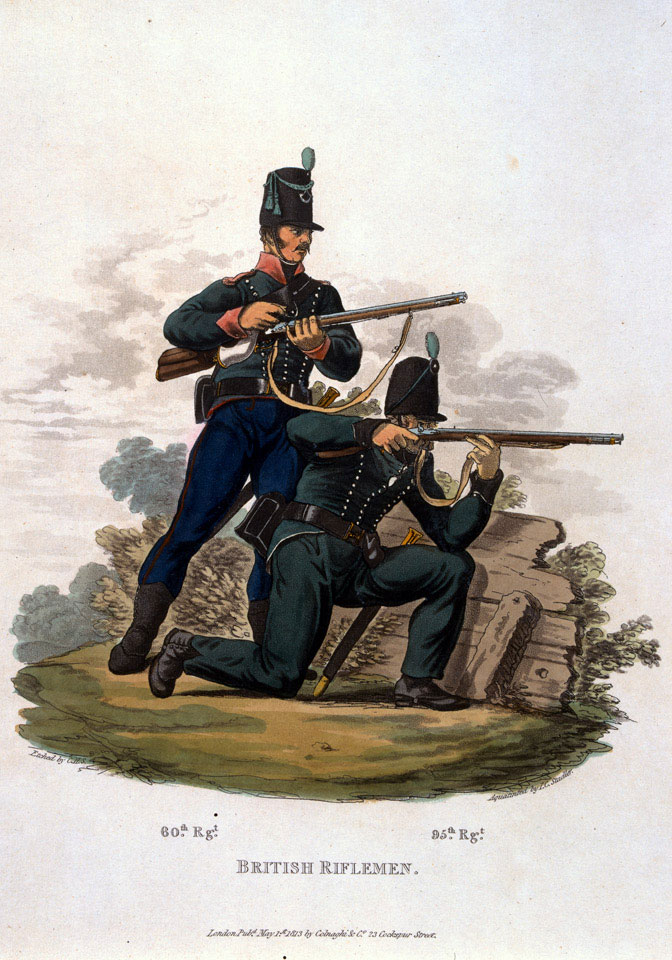
1812 engraving of a regimental private (left)

During the Napoleonic Wars, the regiment saw action in the Peninsular War. The first four battalions had been raised as regular line battalions, but in 1797 a 5th battalion had been raised on Barbados, with additional companies formed on the Isle of Wight, and equipped entirely with rifles. The troops of the 5th battalion were so effective that Sir Arthur Wellesley recommended their use to the divisional commanders describing them as the "most useful, active and brave troops in the field".

A 7th battalion was raised specifically for service in the American War of 1812.

=== Anglo-Egyptian War and Second Boer War ===
In 1815, the regiment was renamed to the Duke of York's Own Rifle Corps before being renamed again in 1830 to the King's Royal Rifle Corps (KRRC). In 1858, the Rifle Depot at Winchester was made their headquarters. The regiment served in the Anglo-Egyptian War in 1882. During the rest of the 1800s, the unit also was active in China, Canada (Wolseley expedition), Afghanistan, India, Burma and South Africa. The regiment was deployed during the Second Boer War from the outset playing a key role in the first battle at Talana Hill. Two officers from the regiment were awarded the Victoria Cross; Lieutenant Frederick Roberts and Lieutenant Llewelyn Alberic Emilius Price-Davies. Private Frederick Corbett also received the Victoria Cross for his action at Kafr Dowar, Egypt, on 5 August 1882; his VC was later rescinded when he was convicted of embezzlement, theft, and being absent without leave. Following the end of the war in South Africa, the 1st battalion was transferred to Malta, where it arrived in October 1902.

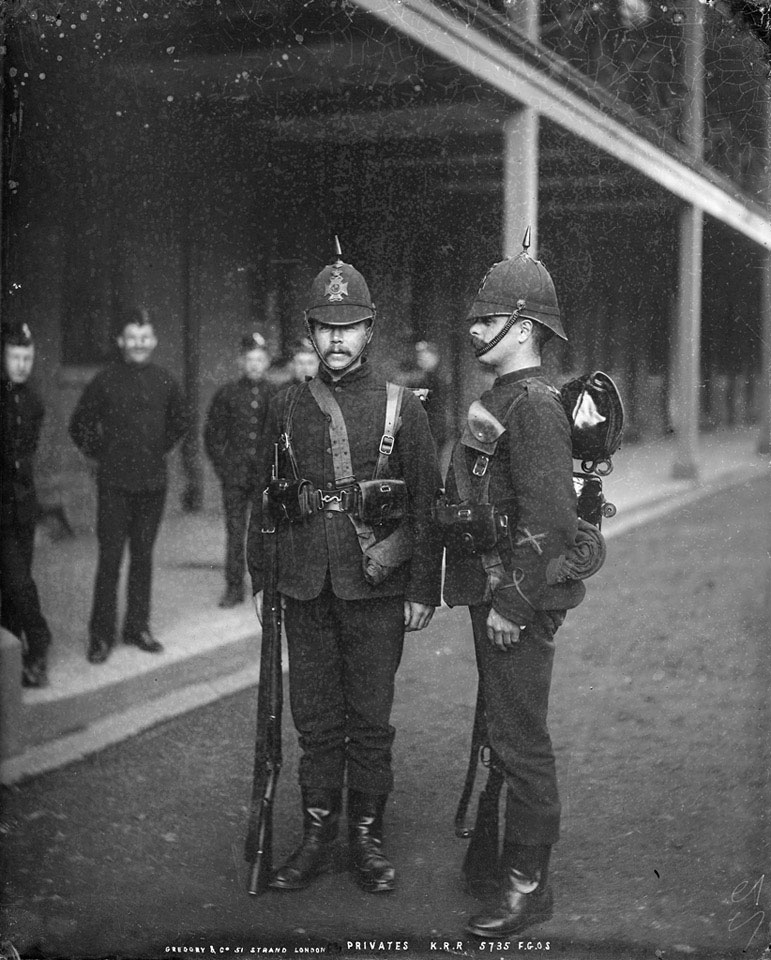
Two regimental privates, c. 1900

In 1908, the Volunteers and Militia were reorganised nationally, with the former becoming the Territorial Force and the latter the Special Reserve; the regiment now had two Reserve but no Territorial battalions.

=== First World War ===
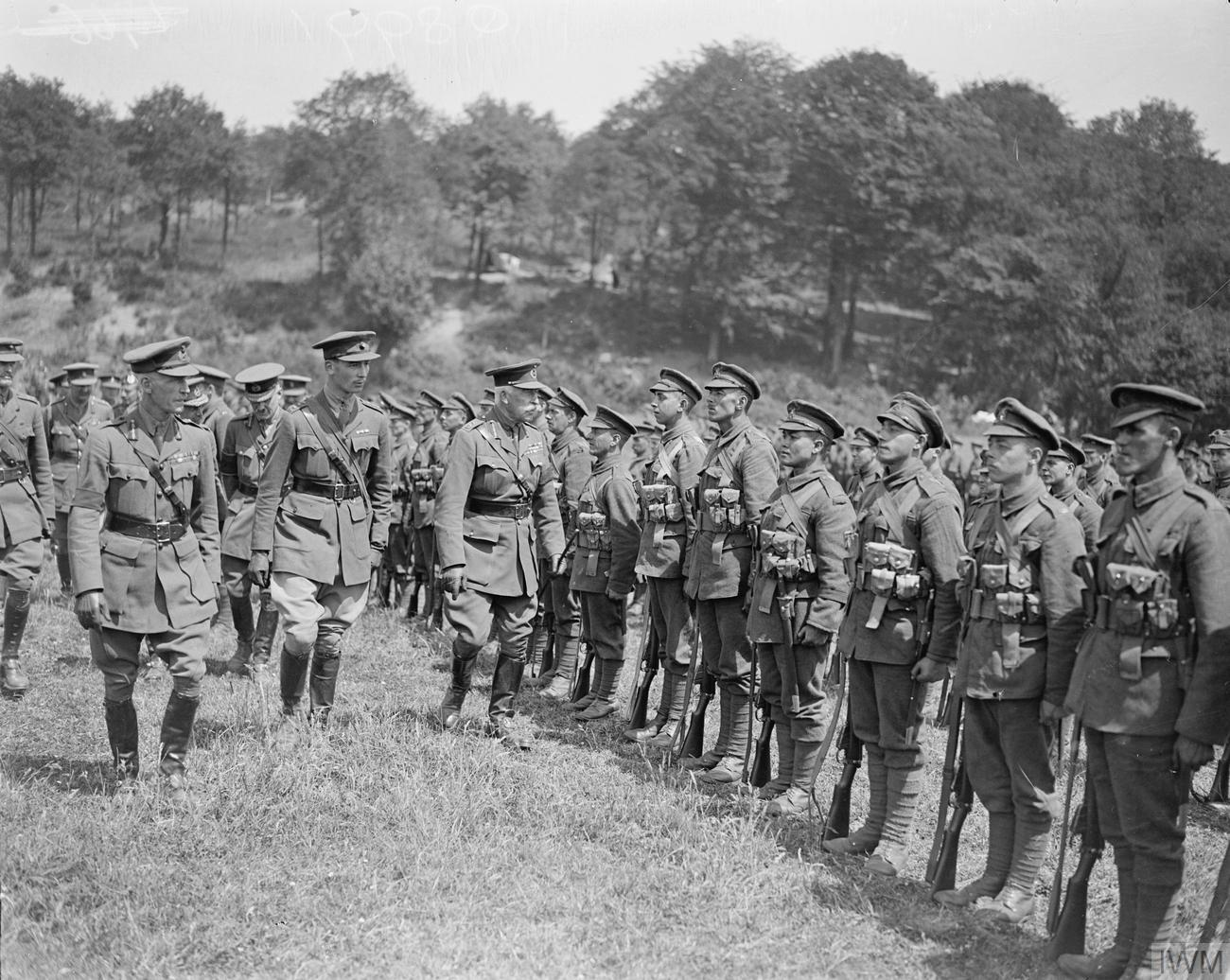
Prince Arthur inspecting tommies of the 2nd Battalion, KRRC, in France, 1 July 1918.

==== Regular Army ====
The 1st Battalion landed at Rouen as part of the 6th Brigade in the 2nd Division in August 1914 for service on the Western Front. It saw action at the Battle of Mons in August 1914, the First Battle of the Marne and the First Battle of the Aisne in September 1914 and First Battle of Ypres in October 1914. It fought at the Battle of Festubert in May 1915, the Battle of Loos in September 1915 and the Battle of the Somme in Autumn 1916 before taking part in the advance to the Hindenburg Line, the Battle of Arras in November 1917, the Battle of Cambrai in November 1917, the Second Battle of the Somme in Autumn 1918 and the Battle of the Selle in October 1918.

The 2nd Battalion landed at Le Havre as part of the 2nd Brigade in the 1st Division in August 1914 for service on the Western Front and saw action at the Battle of Aubers Ridge in May 1915.

The 3rd Battalion landed at Le Havre as part of the 80th Brigade in the 27th Division in December 1914 for service on the Western Front and saw action at the Second Battle of Ypres in April 1915.

The 4th Battalion landed at Le Havre as part of the 80th Brigade in the 27th Division in December 1914 for service on the Western Front and saw action at the Second Battle of Ypres in April 1915 but moved to Salonika in November 1915 before returning to France in June 1918.

==== Territorial force ====
The regiment did not have any territorial force battalions.

==== New armies ====
The 7th (Service) Battalion landed at Boulogne-sur-Mer as part of the 41st Brigade in the 14th (Light) Division in August 1914 for service on the Western Front and saw action in the Second Battle of Ypres in May 1915, the Battle of Delville Wood in July 1916 and the Battle of Flers–Courcelette in September 1916 as well as the advance to the Hindenburg Line, the Battle of Arras in April 1917, the Battle of Langemark in August 1917, the First Battle of Passchendaele in October 1917 and the Second Battle of Passchendaele in November 1917 before taking part in the Battle of St Quentin in March 1918 and the Battle of the Avre in April 1918.

The 8th (Service) Battalion landed at Boulogne-sur-Mer as part of the 41st Brigade in the 14th (Light) Division in May 1915 for service on the Western Front and saw action in most of the same battles as the 7th Battalion. The 9th (Service) Battalion landed at Boulogne-sur-Mer as part of the 42nd Brigade in the 14th (Light) Division in May 1915 for service on the Western Front and saw action in most of the same battles as the 7th and 8th battalions.

The 10th (Service) Battalion and 11th (Service) Battalion landed at Boulogne-sur-Mer as part of the 59th Brigade in the 20th (Light) Division in July 1915 for service on the Western Front and saw action at the Battle of Mont Sorrel in June 1916, the Battle of Delville Wood in July 1916 and the Battle of Guillemont in September 1916 as well as the Battle of Flers–Courcelette in September 1916, the Battle of Morval in September 1916 and the Battle of Le Transloy in October 1916 before taking part in the advance to the Hindenburg Line, the Battle of Langemarck in August 1917, the Battle of the Menin Road Ridge in September 1917, the Battle of Polygon Wood in September 1917 and the Battle of Cambrai in November 1917.

The 12th (Service) Battalion landed at Boulogne-sur-Mer as part of the 60th Brigade in the 20th (Light) Division in July 1915 for service on the Western Front and saw action in most of the same battles as the 10th and 11th Battalions.

The 13th (Service) Battalion landed at Boulogne-sur-Mer as part of the 111th Brigade in the 37th Division in July 1915 for service on the Western Front and saw action at the Battle of Morval in September 1916, the advance to the Hindenburg Line and the Battle of Arras in April 1917 as well as the Battle of Passchendaele in Autumn 1917, the Battle of Cambrai in November 1917 and the Hundred Days Offensive in Autumn 1918 before taking part in the Battles of the Hindenburg Line and the Final Advance in Picardy.

The 16th (Service) Battalion (Church Lads' Brigade) landed at Le Havre as part of the 100th Brigade in the 33rd Division in November 1915 for service on the Western Front.

The 17th (Service) Battalion (British Empire League) landed at Le Havre as part of the 117th Brigade in the 39th Division in March 1916 for service on the Western Front.

The 18th (Service) Battalion (Arts & Crafts) landed at Le Havre as part of the 122nd Brigade in the 41st Division on 3 May 1916 for service on the Western Front.

The 20th (Service) Battalion (British Empire League Pioneers) landed at Le Havre as pioneer battalion for the 3rd Division in March 1916 for service on the Western Front.

The 21st (Service) Battalion (Yeoman Rifles) landed in France as part of the 124th Brigade in the 41st Division in May 1916 for service on the Western Front but moved to Italy in November 1917 before returning to France in March 1918.

Seven members of the regiment received the Victoria Cross.

=== Inter-war years ===
After 1918, the unit returned to garrison duties in India, Palestine and Ireland. In 1922, the regiment was reduced from four to two battalions with the third and fourth being disbanded. In 1926, the Regiment was reorganised as one of the first mechanised infantry regiments.

=== Second World War ===
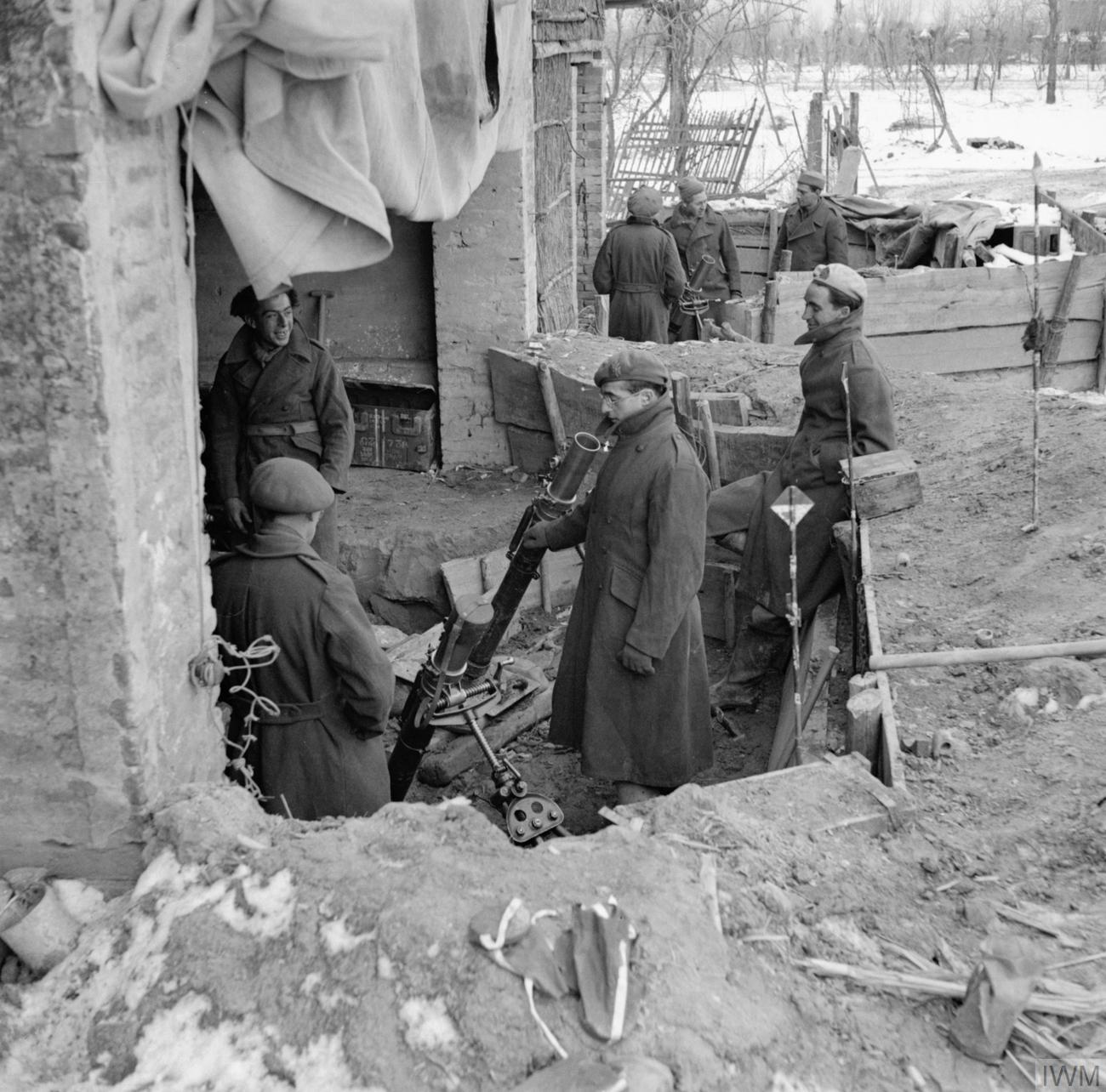
Regimental troops with ML 3-inch mortars in Italy, 27 January 1945

The 1st Battalion, KRRC, commanded initially by Lieutenant Colonel William Gott, was deployed to North Africa upon war's outbreak and saw action as part of the pivot group within the 7th Armoured Division at the Battle of Sidi Rezegh in November 1941, the First Battle of El Alamein in July 1942 and the Second Battle of El Alamein in October 1942 during the Western Desert Campaign. Rifleman John Beeley was awarded a posthumous Victoria Cross for his actions during Operation Crusader in North Africa in late 1941. The battalion, now part of the 2nd Armoured Brigade of the 1st Armoured Division, was then engaged in action throughout the final stages of the Tunisian Campaign. The battalion, now commanded by Lieutenant Colonel Edward Williams, served in the Italian Campaign then with the independent 9th Armoured Brigade and finally the 6th Armoured Division's 61st Infantry Brigade.

The 2nd Battalion, KRRC, commanded by Lieutenant Colonel Thomas Wilson, was part of the British Expeditionary Force (BEF) that landed in France in May 1940. The battalion, which was part of the 30th Infantry Brigade, 1st Armoured Division, and now commanded by Lieutenant Colonel Euan Miller, was lost in the defence of Calais, where the brigade slowed the German advance and enabled the Dunkirk evacuation to proceed. The battalion was reformed in the summer of 1940 under the command of Lieutenant Colonel George Erskine and transferred to the 22nd Armoured Brigade of the 1st Armoured Division. The reformed battalion took part in the Battle of Gazala in May 1942 and the Second Battle of El Alamein in October 1942 during the North African Campaign, forming part of the division's 7th Motor Brigade during the latter engagement and transferring to 4th Armoured Brigade in January 1943. Now under Lieutenant Colonel W. Heathcote-Amory, the battalion continued serving with 4th Armoured Brigade in the Normandy landings in June 1944 and the subsequent campaign in North-West Europe, finally leaving 1st Division six days after VE Day. Two officers of note served with the battalion in its final campaign of the war, Roland Gibbs and Edwin Bramall.

The 1st Battalion of the Queen Victoria's Rifles (QFR) was a Territorial Army (TA) unit which had been closely associated with the KRRC. The battalion, commanded by Lieutenant Colonel J. A. M. Elison-Mccartney, was initially part of the TA 1st London Division, serving as the division's motorcycle battalion. However, like the 2nd Battalion, it was also lost in the defence of Calais in May 1940. The battalion was later reformed in the United Kingdom and, in December 1940, transferred to the 27th Armoured Brigade, part of the newly formed 9th Armoured Division.

The 9th Battalion (The Rangers) was deployed to the Mediterranean theatre as part of the 1st Armoured Brigade in the 7th Armoured Division. It saw action in the Greek campaign in April 1941 before being disbanded in August 1942.

=== Royal Green Jackets and The Rifles ===
In 1958 for administrative purposes, the KRRC was brigaded with the Oxfordshire and Buckinghamshire Light Infantry and the Rifle Brigade to form the Green Jackets Brigade. In 1958, the regiment was re-titled the 2nd Green Jackets, the King's Royal Rifle Corps, while the two other regiments of the Green Jackets Brigade were re-titled the 1st Green Jackets (43rd and 52nd) and 3rd Green Jackets, the Rifle Brigade (Prince Consort's Own) respectively. In 1966, the three regiments were amalgamated to form the three battalions of the Royal Green Jackets.

== Regimental museum ==
The regimental collection is held by the The Rifleman's Museum which is based at Peninsula Barracks in Winchester.

== Territorial battalions ==
The territorial battalions were as follows:

- Queen Victoria's Rifles
- The Rangers
- The Queen's Westminsters

In the Second World War, the following territorial battalions were formally made part of the KRRC:

- 1st Battalion Queen Victoria's Rifles – 7th Battalion KRRC
- 2nd Battalion Queen Victoria's Rifles – 8th Battalion KRRC
- 1st Battalion The Rangers – 9th Battalion KRRC
- 2nd Battalion The Rangers – 10th Battalion KRRC
- 1st Battalion The Queen's Westminsters – 11th Battalion KRRC
- 2nd Battalion The Queen's Westminsters – 12th Battalion KRRC

== Cadet battalions ==
There were two cadet battalions: 1st Cadet Battalion, The King's Royal Rifle Corps and Queen Victoria's Rifles Cadet Corps (re-titled the 2nd Cadet Battalion, The King's Royal Rifle Corps in 1945). Over the years, the formation of the cadet battalions was changed regularly, due to the changes to do with rules and the commanding officer. The 1st Cadet Battalion owes its foundation to the Reverend Freeman Wills, who was commissioned into the Volunteer Army in the rank of captain on 26 July 1890. He was also Vicar of St Agatha's just behind Sun Street, Finsbury Square. On receiving his commission he decided to form a cadet company within the 1st Cadet Battalion, the Royal West Surrey Regiment. The company quickly expanded to become the 2nd Cadet Battalion, the Royal West Surrey Regiment, at which point he moved the battalion headquarters to No. 2 Finsbury Square (and in 1904 to 24 Sun Street, which he had specially built for the purpose). In 1894 he applied to Prince George, Duke of Cambridge, Colonel-in-Chief, to affiliate to the regiment, with the title of 1st Cadet Battalion, the King's Royal Rifle Corps. Consent was granted on 8 November 1894, and the battalion has remained a part of the regiment ever since.

In the days of their foundation, cadet battalions were privately organised and funded. On becoming a part of the King's Royal Rifle Corps, subscriptions began to flow in and, after the commanding officer had spent nearly £1,000, the battalion was placed on a financial basis that many volunteer corps would have envied. There were to be many ups and down in later years, especially when recognition of the Cadet Force was withdrawn between the two world wars, but fortunately the enthusiasm and commitment of those involved consistently triumphed over the parsimony of governments.

In 1900, when volunteers were urgently needed for the Second Boer War, the commanding officer, Colonel Freeman Croft-Wills, persuaded the War Office to accept a company of the older cadets, principally N.C.O.s (non-commissioned officers), the company being enrolled in the City Imperial Volunteers. Around 100 cadets thus served in South Africa with this unit, whilst other cadets and ex-cadets served in the Royal Army Medical Corps, and other units. Four were killed in action, one serving with the 1st Battalion King's Royal Rifle Corps at the Battle of Dundee, and the others with units of the C.I.V.s. Their comrades erected brass plaques in their memory in the Drill Hall at Sun Street. These are now displayed in the Cadet Company Office here at Davies Street.

In recognition of this service, King Edward VII granted the battalion the honour of wearing on its accoutrements the battle honour "South Africa 1900–1902" (Army Order 151 of 1905). The announcement of this privilege was made to the battalion by King George V, then Prince of Wales, when, accompanied by Queen Mary, he distributed the prizes at the Guildhall in the City of London. The 1st Cadet Battalion King's Royal Rifle Corps are the only cadet unit in the United Kingdom to have been granted such an honour and are permitted to wear the miniature 60th cap badge with the single battle honour, and call their cadets "riflemen".

The 2nd Cadet Battalion, the King's Royal Rifle Corps was formed in 1942 when a Home Guard instruction was issued ordering each Home Guard battalion to raise a cadet unit. Lieutenant-Colonel R.L. Clark of Queen Victoria's Rifles was given the task, and on 15 May 1942 the Queen Victoria's Rifles Cadet Corps was born. Over the next three years the unit expanded to five companies, which in April 1945 led to it being re-titled the 2nd Cadet Battalion, The King's Royal Rifle Corps. In 1951 the 1st and 2nd Cadet Battalion were amalgamated. This resulted in the disposal of the headquarters of the 1st Cadet Battalion at Sun Street. In 1954, the battalion office of the 'new' 1st Cadet Battalion was established at 56 Davies Street, where it remains to this day.

Today, the KRRC 1st Cadet Battalion still exists, with the following units making up the battalion:

- A Company, 231 KRRC (Paddington) Rifles ACF
- B Company, 232 KRRC (Westminster) Rifles ACF
- C Company, 233 KRRC (Camden) Rifles ACF
- D Company, 234 KRRC (Putney) Rifles ACF

All these ACF units are currently in the Middlesex and Northwest London Sector Army Cadet Force.

== Alliances ==
Alliances include:

- Canada – The Queen's Own Rifles of Canada (1956–1966)
- Canada - The Victoria Rifles of Canada (Until 1965)
- Canada - The Royal Rifles of Canada (Until 1965)
- Canada - The Dufferin Rifles of Canada (Until 1936)
- Canada - The Dufferin and Haldimand Rifles of Canada (1936-1946)
- Canada - 56th Field Regiment (Dufferin and Haldimand Rifles), RCA (1946-1966)
- Canada - The Halifax Rifles (Until 1965)
- Canada - The King's Own Rifles of Canada (Until 1946)
- Canada - The Saskatchewan Dragoons (1946-1966)
- Canada - The Regina Rifle Regiment (Until 1966)
- Australia – Sydney University Regiment

== See also ==
- Category:Battle honours of the King's Royal Rifle Corps
- Category:King's Royal Rifle Corps officers
- Category:King's Royal Rifle Corps soldiers
- Rifle Brigade – sister regiment sharing much common history and traditions

== Sources ==
- Cusick, Ray (2014). Wellington's Rifles: The Origins, Development and Battles of the Rifle Regiments in the Peninsular War and at Waterloo from 1758 to 1815. Pen & Sword. ISBN 978-1781592878.
- Griffith, Robert (2019). Riflemen: The History of the 5th Battalion, 60th (Royal American) Regiment 1797-1818. Helion & Co. ISBN 978-1911628460.
- Wallace, Lieutenant-General Sir Christopher (2005). The King's Royal Rifle Corps - the 60th Rifles – A Brief History: 1755 to 1965. Royal Green Jackets Museum Trust, Winchester. ISBN 0-9549-3700-7.
- Wallace, Captain Nesbit Willoughby (1879). A Regimental chronicle and list of officers: The 60th, or The King's Royal Rifle Corps formerly the 62nd, or The Royal American Regiment of Foot. Harrison.
