= Green Jackets Brigade =

O Group Green Jackets Brigade
- Active: 1946–1966
- Country: United Kingdom
- Branch: British Army
- Type: Administrative
- Garrison/HQ: Upper Barracks, Winchester

Commanders
- Representative Colonel: FM Sir Francis Festing (from 1963)

The Green Jackets Brigade (known as O Group until 1948) was an administrative brigade of the British Army from 1946 to 1966, that administered the English rifle regiments.

== History ==
After the Second World War the British Army had fourteen infantry depots, each bearing a letter. Infantry Depot O at Upper Barracks, Winchester was the headquarters for the two rifle regiments and the Middlesex Regiment.

In 1948, the depots adopted names and this depot became the Green Jackets Brigade. At the same time the Middlesex Regiment was transferred to the Home Counties Brigade, with the remaining regiments each being reduced to a single battalion. The Brigade combined the depots of:

- The King's Royal Rifle Corps
- The Rifle Brigade (Prince Consort's Own)

Under the Defence Review announced in July 1957, the infantry of the line was reorganised, and on 1 April 1958, the 1st Battalion Oxfordshire and Buckinghamshire Light Infantry was transferred from the Light Infantry Brigade to the Green Jackets Brigade. The regiment was subsequently renamed as the 1st Green Jackets (43rd and 52nd) on 7 November 1958. The remaining two regiments were also renamed as the 2nd and 3rd Green Jackets on 7 November, so that the Brigade contained three battalions:

- 1st Green Jackets (43rd and 52nd)
- 2nd Green Jackets, The King's Royal Rifle Corps
- 3rd Green Jackets, The Rifle Brigade

On 1 January 1966, the three regiments were amalgamated into a single three battalion "large regiment" called the Royal Green Jackets. In 1968, the Green Jackets Brigade was merged with the Light Infantry Brigade to form the Light Division.

== Units ==
Throughout its existence, the brigade was made up of the following units:

=== Regular battalions ===
- 1st Battalion, Middlesex Regiment (1946–1948)
- 2nd Battalion, Middlesex Regiment (1946–1948)
- 1st Battalion, King's Royal Rifle Corps (1946–1966)
- 2nd Battalion, King's Royal Rifle Corps (1946–1948, 1950–1957)
- 1st Battalion, Rifle Brigade (The Prince Consort's Own) (1946–1966)
- 2nd Battalion, Rifle Brigade (The Prince Consort's Own) (1946–1948)
- 1st Battalion, Oxfordshire and Buckinghamshire Light Infantry (1958–1966)
- 1st Battalion, Royal Green Jackets (1966–1968)
- 2nd Battalion, Royal Green Jackets (1966–1968)
- 3rd Battalion, Royal Green Jackets (1966–1968)

=== Territorial battalions ===
- 7th Battalion, Middlesex Regiment (1947–1948)
- 8th Battalion, Middlesex Regiment (1947)
- Queen Victoria's Rifles, King's Royal Rifle Corps (1947–1961)
- Queen's Westminsters, King's Royal Rifle Corps (1947–1961)
- Queen's Royal Rifles, King's Royal Rifle Corps (1961–1967)
- London Rifle Brigade, Rifle Brigade (The Prince Consort's Own) (1947–1960)
- The Rangers, Rifle Brigade (The Prince Consort's Own) (1947–1960)
- London Rifle Brigade/Rangers, Rifle Brigade (The Prince Consort's Own) (1960–1967)
- City of London Yeomanry (Rough Riders), Rifle Brigade (The Prince Consort's Own) (1956–1961)
- 4th Battalion, Oxfordshire and Buckinghamshire Light Infantry (1947–1958)
- Oxfordshire and Buckinghamshire Light Infantry (TA) (1958–1967)
- 4th (V) Battalion, Royal Green Jackets (1967–1968)
- 5th (T) Battalion, Royal Green Jackets (1967–1968)
