= Horsa Bridge =

Bridge in France

Coordinates: 49°14′25″N 0°16′00″W

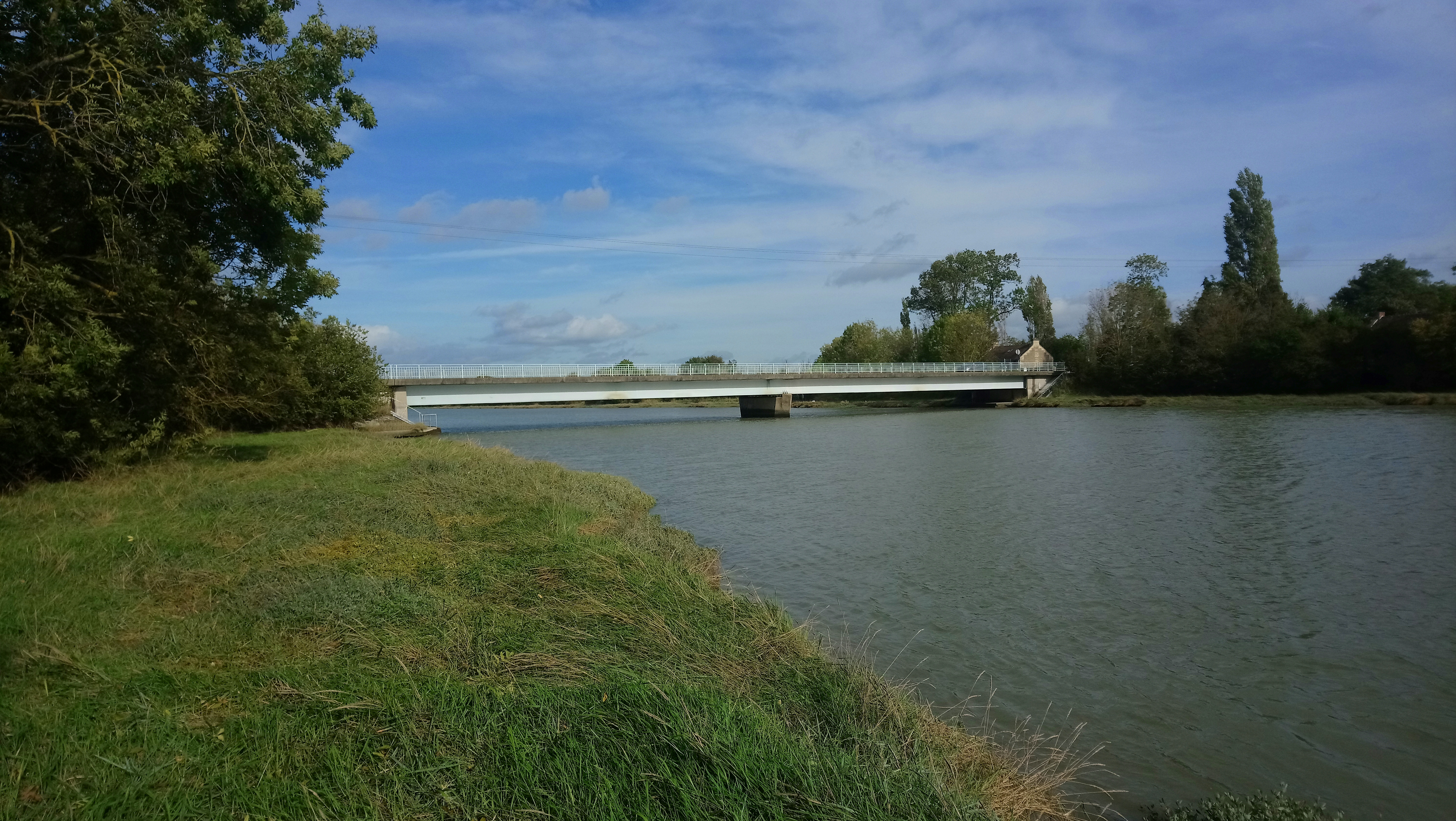
Horsa Bridge

Horsa Bridge, also known as Ranville Bridge, over the Orne river, was, along with Pegasus Bridge, captured during Operation Tonga by gliderborne troops of the 2nd Oxfordshire and Buckinghamshire Light Infantry (the 52nd) in a coup de main operation in the opening minutes of D-Day, 6 June 1944. The seizing of both bridges was considered to be critical to securing the eastern flank of the Normandy landings area, preventing German armour from reaching the British 3rd Infantry Division which was due to start landing on Sword at 07:25. Horsa Bridge, a road bridge, was over 400 yards east of Pegasus Bridge towards the village of Ranville.

== Renaming of the bridge ==
Following the capture of the bridge over the Orne, members of the coup de main operation supported naming the bridge "Light Infantry Bridge". The captured Benouville Bridge had been sign-boarded Pegasus Bridge.

After the Second World War the bridge over the Orne became known as Horsa Bridge, in recognition of the Horsa gliders that had carried the troops to the bridge. The original bridge, which was a steel lattice swing bridge, was replaced in 1971; however, some of the original bridge support structure remains.

In June 1989, on the forty-fifth anniversary of D-Day, the mayor of Ranville unveiled a plaque to commemorate the capture of the river bridge, and the bridge was officially named Horsa Bridge. The memorial plaque was dedicated to the glider pilots and Lieutenant Dennis Fox's and Lieutenant Tod Sweeney's platoons, which had captured the bridge before the Allied invasion of the Normandy beaches began.

== Book and film ==
The operation to capture the bridges was portrayed in the book The Longest Day by Cornelius Ryan and the eponymous film of 1962.
