= 1985 New Year Honours =

British royal recognitions

The New Year Honours 1985 were appointments by most of the Commonwealth realms of Queen Elizabeth II to various orders and honours to reward and highlight good works by citizens of those countries, and honorary ones to citizens of other countries. They were announced on 31 December 1984 to celebrate the year passed and mark the beginning of 1985 in the United Kingdom, New Zealand, Barbados, Mauritius, Fiji, the Bahamas, Papua New Guinea, the Solomon Islands, Tuvalu, Saint Lucia Saint Vincent and the Grenadines, Antigua and Barbuda, and Saint Christopher and Nevis.

The recipients of honours are displayed here as they were styled before their new honour, and arranged by honour, with classes (Knight, Knight Grand Cross, etc.) and then divisions (Military, Civil, etc.) as appropriate.

== United Kingdom and Commonwealth ==
=== Life Peer ===
Baroness

- Dame Mary Warnock, DBE, Senior Research Fellow, St. Hugh's College, Oxford University.

Baron

- Francis Joseph Chapple, former General Secretary, Electrical, Electronic, Telecommunications and Plumbing Union.
- The Right Honourable Lionel Murray, OBE, lately General Secretary, Trades Union Congress.
- Nigel Vinson, LVO, Chairman, Development Commission. President, Industrial Participation Association.

=== Privy Counsellor ===
- Sir Frederic Bennett, MP, Member of Parliament for Torbay.
- Sir Bernard Braine, DL, MP, Member of Parliament for Castle Point.
- Beatrice Nancy, Baroness Seear, Liberal Party Leader, House of Lords.

=== Knight Bachelor ===
- James Blyth, Head of Defence Sales, Ministry of Defence.
- Gordon Charles Brunton, Managing Director and Chief Executive, International Thomson Organization plc.
- John Michael Carlisle, Chairman, Trent Regional Health Authority.
- William David Coats, Chairman, Coats Patons plc.
- John Alfred Cumber, CMG, MBE, TD, Director-General, The Save The Children Fund.
- Peter Howard Darby, CBE, QFSM, HM Chief Inspector of Fire Services for England and Wales.
- (Arthur) Paul Dean, MP. For Political Service.
- Diarmuid Downs, CB. For services to the study of Engineering Technology.
- Kenneth Durham, Chairman, Unilever plc.
- Reginald Goodall, CBE, Conductor. For services to Music.
- Roy Pollard Harding, CBE. For services to education.
- Robert Haslam, Chairman, British Steel Corporation, Chairman, Tate & Lyle plc.
- Christopher Anthony Hogg, Chairman, Courtaulds plc.
- Professor John Frank Charles Kingman, Chairman, Science and Engineering Research Council.
- Professor William Hunter McCrea. For services to Theoretical Astronomy.
- William Fergus Montgomery, MP. For Political Service.
- Rear-Admiral Morgan Charles Morgan-Giles, DSO, OBE, GM. For Political Service.
- Robin Buchanan Nicholson, Chief Scientific Adviser, Cabinet Office.
- Norman John Payne, CBE, Chairman, British Airports Authority.
- William Stanley Peart, Professor of Medicine, University of London.
- John Anthony Quayle, CBE. For services to the Theatre.
- Professor Charles Randolph Quirk, CBE, Vice-Chancellor, University of London.
- Peter William John Reynolds, CBE, Chairman, Rank Hovis McDougall plc.
- Adam Nicholas Ridley. For Political Service.
- David Robinson. For charitable services.
- Jeffrey Maurice Sterling, CBE. For public and industrial services.
- Peter Hannay Bailey Tapsell, MP. For Political Service.
- Lynton Stuart White, MBE, TD, DL. For Political and Public Service.

Diplomatic Service and Overseas List

- Rogerio Hyndman Lobo, CBE, JP. For public services in Hong Kong.
- Arthur Michael Wood, CBE. For medical services to the community in Kenya.

Australian States

State of Queensland

- Sydney Schubert, Co-ordinator-General, Premier's Department.
- Hercules Sinnamon OBE. For services to the community.

=== Order of the Bath ===
==== Knight Grand Cross of the Order of the Bath (GCB) ====
Military Division

- Air Chief Marshal Sir Thomas Kennedy, KCB, AFC, ADC, Royal Air Force.

==== Knight Commander of the Order of the Bath (KCB) ====
Military Division

- Vice Admiral Nicholas John Streynsham Hunt, LVO, Royal Navy.
- Lieutenant General John Lyon Chapple, CBE, (410821), late 2nd King Edward VII's Own Gurkha Rifles (The Sirmoor Rifles).
- Acting Air Marshal Joseph Alfred Gilbert, CB, CBE, Royal Air Force.

Civil Division

- Peter Esmond Lazarus, CB, Permanent Secretary, Department of Transport.
- Michael Edward Quinlan, CB, Permanent Secretary, Department of Employment.

==== Companion of the Order of the Bath (CB) ====
Military Division

Royal Navy

- Rear Admiral William Alleyne Higgins, CBE.
- Rear Admiral Geoffrey Gordon Ward Marsh, OBE.

Army

- Major General Keith Burch, CBE, (418208), late The Royal Anglian Regiment.
- Major General Alastair Wesley Dennis, OBE, (420824), late 16th/5th The Queen's Royal Lancers.
- Major General Richard Eustace John Gerrard-Wright, CBE, (407841), late The Royal Anglian Regiment.
- Major General Ronald Matthew Pearson, MBE, QHDS, (283274), late Royal Army Dental Corps.
- Major General George Michael Geoffrey Swindells (400534), late 9th/12th Royal Lancers (Prince of Wales's).
- Major General John Peter Barry Condliffe Watts, CBE, MC, (415012), late Royal Irish Rangers (27th (Inniskilling), 83rd and 87th).

Royal Air Force

- Air Vice-Marshal Peter Spencer Collins, AFC.
- Air Vice-Marshal Robin Lowther Lees, MBE.
- Air Vice-Marshal Henry Alan Merriman, CBE, AFC, (Retired).

Civil Division

- Arthur Kingsley Hall Atkinson, Chief Executive, Intervention Board for Agricultural Produce.
- William Reay Atkinson, Regional Director, North East Regional Office, Department of Trade and Industry.
- John Bolton, Chief Works Officer, Department of Health and Social Security.
- Norman Eley Clarke, Deputy Secretary, Department of Health and Social Security.
- Kenneth Playfair Duncan, Deputy Director-General, Health and Safety Executive.
- John Ellis, Deputy Director (Vehicles), Royal Armament Research and Development Establishment, Ministry of Defence.
- David Ewart Riley Faulkner, Deputy Under-Secretary of State, Home Office.
- Euan Douglas Graham, lately Principal Clerk of Private Bills, House of Lords.
- Donald David Grant, Director General, Central Office of Information.
- Anthony John Gower Isaac, Deputy Chairman, Board of Inland Revenue.
- Peter George Edward Fitzgerald Jones, Director, Atomic Weapons Research Establishment, Ministry of Defence.
- Brian Percival Tickle, Senior Registrar, Principal Registry of the Family Division, High Court of Justice.
- Michael John Ware, Solicitor and Legal Adviser, Department of the Environment.
- Ian Matthew Wilson, Under Secretary, Scottish Education Department.

=== Order of Saint Michael and Saint George ===
==== Knight Commander of the Order of St Michael and St George (KCMG) ====
- William Bentley, CMG, HM Ambassador, Oslo.
- Alan Clowes Goodison, CMG, CVO, HM Ambassador, Dublin.
- Cynlais Morgan James, CMG, HM Ambassador, Mexico City.
- Robert Mark Russell, CMG, HM Ambassador, Ankara.

==== Companion of the Order of St Michael and St George (CMG) ====
- Donald Francis Ballentyne, HM Consul-General, Los Angeles.
- John Dixon Ikle Boyd, lately Counsellor, United Kingdom Mission to the United Nations, New York.
- Richard Eagleson Gordon Burges Watson, HM Consul-General, Milan.
- John David Fay, lately Organisation for Economic Co-operation and Development, Paris.
- Giles Eden Fitzherbert, Minister, HM Embassy, Rome.
- Anthony Charles Galsworthy, Foreign and Commonwealth Office.
- Alistair John Hunter, Counsellor and Head of Chancery, HM Embassy, Bonn.
- Ronald Alexander McDonald, Foreign and Commonwealth Office.
- Michael David Thomas, QC, Attorney-General, Hong Kong.
- Philip John Weston, Foreign and Commonwealth Office.
- David Clive Wilson, Foreign and Commonwealth Office.

Australian States

State of Queensland

- Reginald Murray Williams. For services to the outback community of Australia.

=== Royal Victorian Order ===
==== Knight Commander of the Royal Victorian Order (KCVO) ====
- Colonel Hugh Trefusis Brassey, OBE, MC.
- Major Sir Hew Fleetwood Hamilton-Dalrymple, Bt., CVO.
- Lieutenant General Sir David George House, GCB, CBE, MC.
- Russell Dillon Wood, CVO, VRD.

==== Commander of the Royal Victorian Order (CVO) ====
- The Very Reverend Professor John McIntyre.
- Mona Mitchell, LVO.
- Major General Desmond Hind Garrett Rice, CBE.

==== Lieutenant of the Royal Victorian Order (LVO) ====
- Michael Colborne.
- John Kenneth Holroyd.
- Michael Sinclair MacAuslan Shea.
- Nigel Ralph Southward.
- Wing Commander Brian Peter Synnott, Royal Air Force.
- Commander Cecil William Whittington, MBE, Royal Navy (Retired).

==== Member of the Royal Victorian Order (MVO) ====
- Amanda Kate Atwell.
- Warrant Officer Kenneth Broddle (E2454544), Royal Air Force.
- John Foster.
- Margaret Alice Gilmour, MBE.
- Gerald Stephen Grote.
- Rosemary Joan Johnston.
- John David Bowes Mordaunt.
- Elizabeth Winifred Kate Pearce.
- Sergeant Major Cyril Horace Phillips, MBE, The Queen's Body Guard of the Yeomen of the Guard.
- Elizabeth Clare Potts.
- Inspector Peter Reginald Prentice, Metropolitan Police.
- The Honourable Priscilla Jane Stephanie Roberts.
- Chief Yeoman Warder William John Russell.
- Chief Inspector Colin Leslie Haywood-Trimming, Metropolitan Police.

==== Medal of the Royal Victorian Order (RVM) ====
In Silver

- John Armstrong.
- Horace James Bradbury.
- Robert James Brant.
- Muriel Bertha Bryant.
- Police Constable Dennis George Claydon, Metropolitan Police.
- P8077871 Sergeant Peter Frederick Coy, Royal Air Force.
- Kenneth Dowson.
- Kenneth Claude Dunstan.
- Peggy Gladys Hoath.
- Petty Officer Steward Michael Luigi Lumsden, DO71110Q.
- Roger Ian Oliver.
- Patrick Norman Pope.
- Olive Rattle.
- Police Sergeant William James Reid, Metropolitan Police.
- Wilfred Sollitt.
- Police Constable William Norman Thornborrow, Metropolitan Police.
- Arthur James White.

=== Order of the British Empire ===
==== Knight Grand Cross of the Order of the British Empire (GBE) ====
Military Division

- General Sir Frank Kitson, KCB, CBE, MC, ADC (Gen.), (362061), Colonel Commandant 2nd Battalion The Royal Green Jackets, Honorary Colonel Oxford University Officers' Training Corps Territorial Army.

==== Knight Commander of the Order of the British Empire (KBE) ====
Military Division

- Lieutenant General William Cameron Moffat, OBE, QHS, (438315), late Royal Army Medical Corps.

Civil Division

- The Right Honourable Edward Dillon Lott du Cann. For Political and Public Service.

Diplomatic Service and Overseas List

- John David Gibbons. For public services in Bermuda.

==== Commander of the Order of the British Empire (CBE) ====
Military Division

Royal Navy

- Commodore David Henry Morse, ADC.
- Captain Raymond Harry Norman.
- Commodore Hugo Moresby White.

Army

- Colonel Eric Hugh Barker, OBE, (463307), late Corps of Royal Engineers.
- Brigadier Harry Gregorius Brown (442113), late Royal Army Ordnance Corps.
- Colonel Brian Trevor John, TD, ADC, (471966), late The Royal Regiment of Wales (24th/41st Foot) Territorial Army.
- Colonel James Frederick Junor Johnston (461457), late Corps of Royal Electrical and Mechanical Engineers.
- Brigadier Frederick John Lucas (419294), Royal Pioneer Corps.
- Brigadier Anthony John Griffin Pollard (446685), late The Royal Anglian Regiment.
- Brigadier Peter Gerald Sandeman Tower (424488), late Coldstream Guards.

Royal Air Force

- Air Commodore Eric Norman Meats, (Retired).
- Air Commodore Derek Arthur Saunders.
- Group Captain Peter John Harding, AFC.
- Group Captain Richard Edward Johns, LVO, OBE.

Civil Division

- Richard Clarke Allan, LVO, lately Assistant Secretary, Scottish Home and Health Department.
- Thomas David Williams Astorga, Director, Building Division, Common Services Agency for the Scottish Health Service.
- Ronald Eric George Back, Managing Director, National Networks, British Telecom plc.
- John Richard Thomas Bailey, GM, Chief Constable, Ministry of Defence Police.
- Alan George Bamford, Principal, Westhill College, Birmingham.
- Josephine Clare Barstow (Mrs. A. Anderson), Opera Singer.
- Basil Bean, Chief Executive, Merseyside Development Corporation.
- Harry Crombie Beveridge, OBE. For Political and Public Service.
- Michael Bird, Chairman, Massey Ferguson Holdings Ltd.
- Professor John Ivan George Cadogan, Director of Research, British Petroleum
- John Ashton Cannon, Professor of Modern History, University of Newcastle upon Tyne.
- George Chambers, Chief Executive, Milk Marketing Board for Northern Ireland.
- Maurice Chandler. For Political and Public Service.
- Ainslie Bennett Leigh Clarke, OBE, Secretary, Imperial Cancer Research Fund.
- James Robertson Cochrane, President, Lawn Tennis Association.
- Ivor Harold Cohen, TD, Managing Director, Mullard Ltd.
- David Robert Collinson, LVO, Assistant Secretary, HM Treasury.
- Douglas Livingstone Cooper, Deputy Managing Director, Harland & Wolff plc.
- Professor Robert Frank Curtis, Director, Food Research Institute, Norwich, Agricultural and Food Research Council.
- Peter Desmond Cutting, Chief Investigation Officer, Board of Customs and Excise.
- Derek Harold Davison, Chairman and Chief Executive, Britannia Airways Ltd.
- Leopold David de Rothschild. For services to music and musical charities.
- John Albert Dellow, OBE, Assistant Commissioner, Metropolitan Police.
- William Thomas Devenay, Director of Water, Strathclyde Regional Council.
- James Murray Douglas, Director General, Country Landowners Association. For services to Agriculture.
- John Masterman Ellis, lately Foreign and Commonwealth Office.
- Donald Evans, OBE, Managing Director, Marconi Underwater Systems Ltd.
- Jane Little Finlay, Deputy Chairman, Equal Opportunities Commission.
- John Foster, Director, Countryside Commission for Scotland.
- Paul Leonard Fox, Managing Director and Director of Programmes, Yorkshire Television Ltd.
- Matthew Coulter Furey, Assistant Solicitor, Board of Inland Revenue.
- Ian Michael Gillis, lately Chief Information Officer, Department of Energy.
- James Dundas Hamilton, Senior Partner, Fielding Newson-Smith & Co.
- David St. Clair Harcourt, Chairman, London Commodity Exchange.
- Phillip Douglas George Hares, Deputy Chief Executive and Board Member for Finance, British Shipbuilders.
- John Edward Herrin, Chairman, Welwyn Electronics Ltd.
- James Hetherington, Chief Executive, City of Manchester.
- Donald Andrew Holland, Chairman and Managing Director, Balfour Beatty Ltd. For services to Export.
- Angela Marie Hooper. For Political Service.
- John James Howard, lately Director and Chief General Manager, Royal Insurance Group.
- Geoffrey Neville Jackson, formerly, Chairman, West Midlands Regional Chambers of Commerce.
- Max Alfred Jaffe, lately Legal Adviser, Crown Estate Office.
- Peter Jefferson, Production Director, Aircraft Group, British Aerospace plc.
- Paul Geoffrey Jeffery, Deputy Director, Laboratory of the Government Chemist, Department of Trade and Industry.
- Mervyn John Jenkins. For Political and Public Service.
- John Southwood Jennings, Managing Director, Shell UK Ltd. Exploration and Production.
- Reginald Stuart Johnson, Director of Education, Leeds Metropolitan District Council.
- Barrie Russell Jones, Rothes Professor of Preventive Ophthalmology, University of London.
- Edith Körner, lately Chairman, Health Services Information Group.
- Walter Ernest Lane, lately Chairman, Nature Conservancy Council, Advisory Committee for England.
- Philip Stevens Ledger, Principal, Royal Scottish Academy of Music and Drama.
- Angus Steward Macdonald DL, Chairman, Scottish Agricultural Development Council.
- Ian Duncan Mackie, Member, Tayside Regional Council.
- George Ross Mathewson, Chief Executive, Scottish Development Agency.
- William James Mathias, Composer, Professor of Music, University College of North Wales.
- Michael McAtamney, OBE, Deputy Chief Constable, Royal Ulster Constabulary.
- Mary Graham McGeown (M. G. Freeland). For services to Nephrology particularly in Northern Ireland.
- Alexander Edward McIlwain, lately President, Law Society of Scotland.
- Charles McLachlan, QPM, Chief Constable, Nottinghamshire Constabulary.
- William Napier Menzies-Wilson, Chairman, Ocean Transport & Trading plc.
- John Ralph Middleton, lately Assistant Secretary, Department of Education and Science.
- Ronald Andrew Baird Miller, Chairman and Chief Executive, Dawson International plc.
- Naomi Margaret, Lady Mitchison, Writer.
- William David Morton. For Political and Public Service.
- The Reverend Professor Charles Francis Digby Moule. For services to theology.
- Alexander Douglas Ian Nicol, Secretary General of the Faculties, University of Cambridge.
- Michael Francis Oliver, Duke of Edinburgh Professor of Cardiology, University of Edinburgh.
- Rasin Ward Orson, Member, Electricity Council.
- Geoffrey John Parker, Chairman and Managing Director, Felixstowe Dock & Railway Company.
- Leslie Frederick Pocock, Chairman, Liverpool Health Authority.
- Robert Noel Ponsonby, Controller of Music, British Broadcasting Corporation.
- Alastair Robert Wilson Porter, Secretary and Registrar, Royal College of Veterinary Surgeons. For services to the Veterinary Profession.
- Sydney George Pritchard. For services to local government in Montgomeryshire and Powys.
- Bryan Patrick Philip Quilter, Chairman, Domestic Electrical Appliances Economic Development Committee.
- Antony Vernon Nelson Reed, Managing Director, Helicopter and Hovercraft Group, Westland plc.
- Clifton Eugene Bancroft Robinson, OBE, Deputy Chairman, Commission for Racial Equality.
- Frederick Lloyd Roche, Deputy Chairman and Managing Director, Conran Roche, Ltd.
- Harry Rogers, Director, North West Region Property Services Agency, Department of the Environment.
- George Russell, Managing Director and Chief Executive, British Alcan Aluminium Ltd.
- Michael Llewellyn Rutter, Professor of Child Psychiatry, University of London.
- Leslie Charles Thomas Sallabank, Director, George Wimpey plc.
- David Chetwode Samworth, DL, lately Chairman, Meat and Livestock Commission.
- The Reverend John Brian Smethurst, TD. For Political and Public Service.
- Cyril Stanley Smith, Secretary, Economic and Social Research Council.
- Professor John Bedford Stenlake, Chairman, British Pharmacopoeia Commission.
- Charles Crichton Birnie Stevens, OBE, Deputy Chairman, Public Health Laboratory Service Board.
- Denys Miller Sutton, Editor, Apollo.
- Robert Gilmour Jamieson Telfer. For services to Energy Conservation.
- Colin William Carstairs Turner, DFC. For Political Service.
- Alan Willis Ure, Managing Director, Trollope & Colls Ltd.
- David Richard Wall, Associate Director, The Royal Academy of Dancing.
- John Stanton Ward, Painter and Illustrator.
- Alan John Watson. For Political service.
- Colonel Richard Thomas Meurig Williams, OBE, MC, TD, DL, Chairman, Wales Territorial Auxiliary and Volunteer Reserve Association.
- Professor William Morgan Williams. For public service in Wales.
- Ronald Allen Wilson, lately President of the Food Manufacturers' Federation.
- John David Witty, lately Secretary, London Boroughs' Association; lately Chief Executive, Westminster City Council.
- Robin Wilfrid Jerrard Wood, Chairman, Leeds Western Health Authority.

Diplomatic Service and Overseas List

- Chan Nai-keong, Secretary for Lands and Works, Hong Kong.
- John Douglas Charlton Cowl, OBE, DFC. For services to British commercial interests in Spain.
- Donald Alfred Hamley, lately HM Consul-General, Jerusalem.
- Ian Stuart McWalter Henderson, GM, KPM. For services to British interests in Bahrain.
- Norman Henry Lee. For services to British commercial and community interests in Southern California.
- Patrick Francis Xavier Leonard, lately Justice of Appeal, Hong Kong.
- Hamish Thearlach Mathers. For services to British commercial interests in Nigeria.
- Gerald Paul Nazareth, OBE, QC, Law Draughtsman, Hong Kong.
- Bernard William Sharpe, lately staff of the European Commission, Brussels.
- Woo Hon-fai. For public services in Hong Kong.

Australian States

State of Queensland

- Dr. Nicholas Stephen Girdis. For services to the community.

State of Tasmania

- Lawrie George Murdoch. For services to the community.

==== Officer of the Order of the British Empire (OBE) ====
Military Division

Royal Navy

- Commander Michael Charles Fox.
- Commander Malcolm George Harper.
- Commander John Maitland Lane.
- Commander Harold Murden.
- Commander Martin John Ralph Nestor.
- Commander Michael Tilburn Roberts.
- Commander Ninian Lovett Stewart.
- Commander Michael John Waterhouse.
- Major Gervas John O'Neill Wells-Cole, Royal Marines.
- Commander Mark Falcon Whelan.

Army

- Lieutenant Colonel John Richard Dronsfield Andrew (485168), Royal Regiment of Artillery.
- Lieutenant Colonel John Reginald Arthur (445780), Scots Guards (now R.A.R.O.).
- Lieutenant Colonel Stanley Bernard Ball (418188), Royal Corps of Transport.
- Lieutenant Colonel Peter William Barker (454918), Royal Regiment of Artillery.
- Lieutenant Colonel Anthony John Kennion Calder (475113), The Royal Anglian Regiment.
- Lieutenant Colonel (Quartermaster) Thomas John Chapman, BEM, (486807), 4th/7th Royal Dragoon Guards.
- Lieutenant Colonel David Robert Chaundler (476479), The Parachute Regiment.
- Lieutenant Colonel Daniel Lienard de Beaujeu (452941), 14th/20th King's Hussars.
- Lieutenant Colonel Colin Geal (480804), Royal Army Pay Corps.
- Lieutenant Colonel Murray Bernard Neville Howard (473974), Coldstream Guards.
- Lieutenant Colonel Hugh William Lambert (470097), The Royal Anglian Regiment.
- Lieutenant Colonel (now Colonel) Michael Dalrymple Regan (471332), The Light Infantry.
- Lieutenant Colonel David Aitken Scott, TD, (475581), Corps of Royal Engineers, Territorial Army.
- Lieutenant Colonel Stephen Anthony Sellon (474055), The Honourable Artillery Company, Territorial Army.
- Lieutenant Colonel Claude Arthur Smith (440166), Royal Army Ordnance Corps. DL.
- Acting Colonel Denis Sweasey (413928), Army Cadet Force, Territorial Army.
- Lieutenant Colonel Michael John Dawson Walker (481887), The Royal Anglian Regiment.

Royal Air Force

- Wing Commander John Blakeley (609251).
- Wing Commander Maurice Mervyn Foster (607142), (Retired).
- Wing Commander Herbert Greaves (201805), Royal Air Force Volunteer Reserve (Training).
- Wing Commander David Harry Arnold Greenway (4230066).
- Wing Commander Hilton Duncan Herd (2738779).
- Wing Commander Brian Humble (2617894).
- Wing Commander Graham Finch Hingston-Jones (2440798).
- Wing Commander Peter Milford Newman (4131491).
- Wing Commander Frederick John Platts (2486665).
- Wing Commander (now Acting Group Captain) Denis Rutherford West (587119).
- Squadron Leader Colin Alfred Bailey, AE, (5008555), Royal Air Force Volunteer Reserve.

Civil Division

- Clifford Frederick Ackerman, lately Managing Director, Parker Hannifin (UK) Ltd.
- Charles Gibson Alexander, MC, Senior Medical Officer, Department of Health and Social Services, Northern Ireland.
- Nancy Applegate, lately Headmistress, County Upper School, Bury St. Edmunds.
- John Arthur Shelborne Askew, Ophthalmic Optician, Somerset.
- Alexander Leslie Audley. For Political Service.
- Jeanne Marguerite Ayling, Headteacher, Primrose Hill High School, Leeds.
- Noelle Camilla Berners Barker (Mrs. Peake), Professor, Vocal Studies, Guildhall School of Music and Drama.
- Frederick James Barrell, lately Chairman of the Finance Committee, Diocese of Southwark.
- Arthur Cyprian Bastable, Director, Ferranti Industrial Electronics Ltd.
- Geoffrey Noel Tanton Baxter. For Political and Public Service.
- Robert Patterson Beattie, Chief Executive, Northern Ireland Railways Co. Ltd.
- William Douglas Beck, Vice-Convener, Dumfries and Galloway Regional Council.
- Eric Bernard Bellfield, lately Headmaster, Oaklands Park School, Dawlish.
- Jeffrey Bernhard, Chairman, Bernhard Group of Companies.
- Cicely Berry, Principal Voice Teacher, Royal Shakespeare Company.
- Stephen Denis Bingham, Managing Director, Sodastream Ltd.
- George Miller Bird, Assistant Chief Constable, Lothian and Borders Police.
- John Angust Bolt, Business Development Director, Charlton Leslie Offshore Ltd.
- Eric Hider Bowers, lately Engineering Consultant, Vickers Systems Ltd.
- John Stewart Boyd, lately Consultant Surgeon, Northern Health and Social Services Board, Northern Ireland.
- Edward Richard Brennan, Senior Principal, Department of Health and Social Security.
- Betty Brierley, Assistant Chief Probation Officer, Lancashire Probation Service.
- Jenny Smith Ballantyne Browning. For services to social work particularly in Scotland.
- Kenneth William James Frederick Browning, Group Personnel Director, Dowty Group plc, and Chairman, Gloucestershire/Wiltshire Area Manpower Board.
- Marie Elizabeth Brownlee, lately Principal, Bangor Girls' High School, Co. Down.
- Brenda Margaret Bruce (Mrs. B. McCallin), Actress.
- Allan Victor Bryant, Principal Scientific Officer, Ministry of Defence.
- Arthur Frederick William Budden, DFC, Managing Director, Bridport Aviation Products Ltd. For services to Export.
- Anthony Frederick Budge, Chairman and Managing Director, A. F. Budge (Contractors) Ltd., Nottingham.
- Herbert Henry Burchnall, lately Registrar, University of Liverpool.
- David Jeffery Burt, Deputy Managing Director, Hellerman Deutsch Ltd.
- John Gordon Buxton, lately Commander, South and West Yorkshire St. John Ambulance Brigade.
- Betty Champney, lately Chief Nursing Officer, Leeds Western Health Authority.
- Alan Civil, Horn Player.
- Margery Constance Fullarton Collie. For Political and Public Service.
- Michael Kenneth Collins, Chairman and Chief Executive, Reed Building Products plc.
- William Duncan Gumming Cooney, Chief Officer, Cleveland Fire Brigade.
- Alfred Bridges Cotton, Principal Scientific Officer, Ministry of Defence.
- James Philip Cranston, lately Senior Depute Director of Education, Strathclyde Regional Council.
- Graham Thame Stanley Cribb, Director, London Research Station, British Gas Corporation.
- Colin Hartley Curtis, Vehicle Engineering Manager (Buses), London Regional Transport.
- Vera Hannah Darling, lately Principal Professional Officer, Post-Basic Nurse Education, English National Board.
- Lewis Maldwyn Davies. For services to Industry in Wales.
- John Keith Dawson, Head, Energy Technology Division, Harwell, United Kingdom Atomic Energy Authority.
- Sidney Isaac de Haan, lately Chairman, Saga Holidays plc.
- James Alfred Witham Deboo, Group Training Manager, Baker Perkins plc.
- Thomas James Deeley, Director, South Wales Radiotherapy Service, Velindre Hospital, Cardiff.
- Richard Demarco, Director, Richard Demarco Gallery Ltd. For services to Art in Scotland.
- Colin Denton, Senior Regional Building Surveyor, Board of Inland Revenue.
- Alan Michael Dix, Director General, Motor Agents' Association Ltd.
- Nan Douglass, Chairman, Northern Ireland Consumer Council.
- Denis Alexander Dumbreck, Editor of Debates, House of Lords.
- Frederick Ernest Eyre, Chief Engineer and Member, Southern Electricity Board.
- Robert Frederick Farmer, General Secretary, Institute of Journalists.
- Alexander Chapman Ferguson, Manager, Aberdeen Football Club.
- John Allan Finlay, Headteacher, Aston Manor School, Birmingham.
- Keith William Robert Fletcher. For services to Cricket.
- Ralph Terence Ford, QFSM, Chief Fire Officer, North Yorkshire Fire Brigade.
- Eric William Foskett, Director of Environmental Health, Manchester City Council.
- John Robert Foster, Chief Executive, Middlesbrough Borough Council.
- Nicholas Hall Freeman. For services to Local Government in the Royal Borough of Kensington and Chelsea.
- Samuel Joseph Gallagher. For services to small businesses.
- Edna Ruth Gardner, LVO, MBE, Assistant to the Ceremonial Officer.
- William Garner, Chief Executive, Glynwed Steels Ltd.
- William Tanner Gauntlett, Chairman of Council, Royal Agricultural Benevolent Institution, Oxford.
- Basil Gilbert, District Medical Officer, Oldham Health Authority.
- Lancelot Cyril Gilbert Gelling, lately Principal, Askham Bryan College of Agriculture.
- Harold Gould, lately Chairman, The Hearing Aid Council.
- The Venerable Archdeacon Frederick William Gowing, Chairman, Southern Education and Library Board, Northern Ireland.
- John Charles Hall, Deputy Chief Constable, Norfolk Constabulary.
- Walter Bertram Harbert, Director of Social Services, Avon County Council.
- George Robert Alfred Harris, Director, Manchester Ship Canal Company.
- Albert Edward Hawes, Managing Director, Hants and Sussex Aviation Ltd. For services to Export.
- Derek Charles Henderson, Senior Principal, Ministry of Defence.
- John Ronald Henderson, MBE, DL. For services to the community in Berkshire.
- Benjamin Alexander Frederick Hervey-Bathurst, DL. For public service in Hereford and Worcester.
- Charles Gerard Horan, QPM, lately Assistant Chief Constable, Greater Manchester Police.
- Ronald Michael Horsley, General Manager, Springfields Works, British Nuclear Fuels plc.
- William John Hoskin, Managing Director, Micro-surgical Administrative Services Ltd.
- William Brace McNeill Howie, lately Chief Administrative Medical Officer, Grampian Health Board.
- John Frederick Huggett, General Secretary, Church of England Soldiers', Sailors' & Airmen's Clubs.
- Robert Owen Hughes, Farmer, Castell Caereinion, Powys.
- Richard Cenric Humphreys. For services to medicine in Wales.
- Robert Alan Hunt, Deputy Assistant Commissioner, Metropolitan Police.
- Alexander Inglis, lately Principal, Telford College of Further Education.
- John Frederick Islip, lately Senior Stage Inspector for Primary Education, Manchester Local Education Authority.
- James Charles Girvan Jackson, District Administrative Officer, North & West Belfast District, Eastern Health & Social Services Board.
- William Dainton James. For Political and Public Service.
- Dennis Roy Jamieson, Head of Industrial Property Section, Science Reference Library, British Library.
- Ian Evers Tregarthen Jenkin, Principal, Camberwell School of Arts and Crafts.
- Joseph Jenkins, Financial Planning and Systems Manager, Northern Ireland Housing Executive.
- Philip Hilary Jones, lately Deputy Director (Social Affairs), Confederation of British Industry.
- David Trevor Jones. For Political and Public Service.
- David Hudson Kidner. For services to the Justices' Clerks' Society.
- Professor William Kirk. For services to education in Northern Ireland.
- Gerald Charles Kunz. For services to The Royal Smithfield Show.
- Helen Mary Laird. For services to the Girl Guides Association.
- Professor George Eric Lamming, Head, Department of Physiology and Environmental Studies, University of Nottingham.
- Lieutenant Commander Christopher Gordon Lestock Reid, DL, Chief Commissioner for England, Scout Association.
- Wynn Huws Lewis, Principal Professional and Technology Officer, Department of the Environment.
- Thomas Paterson Lindsay, Divisional Veterinary Officer, Ministry of Agriculture, Fisheries and Food.
- William Little, Chairman, Northern Regional Council, General, Municipal and Boilermakers' Trades Union.
- John Locke, Executive Chairman and Director, Bacon and Meat Manufacturers.
- Kenneth Henry Lofts, Director Engineering, GKN Sankey Ltd.
- Captain The Right Honourable William Joseph Long, Secretary, Ulster Sea Fisheries Association.
- John Cameron Low. For services to The Computer Services Industry.
- William Wallays Percival Lucas, General Secretary, Mercantile Marine Services Association.
- Henry Poulton Lunn, Cargo and Operational Adviser, Overseas Containers Ltd.
- George Murray Macaulay, Political Correspondent and London Editor, Dundee Courier.
- Donald Mackney, Head, Soil Survey, England and Wales.
- William Maurice Malcolm, lately Clerk of Royal Society Council.
- John Charles Zelenka Martin, International Director, Scientific Equipment Division, Fisons plc.
- Keith Geoffrey Mathews, Senior Inspector, Board of Customs and Excise.
- Ian Archibald McNaughton McAlpine, Managing Director, Scottish Milk Marketing Board.
- Rosemary Dawn Teresa McRobert, Deputy Director, Consumers' Association.
- Frederick William Millard, General Medical Practitioner, Gloucester.
- John MacGowan Miller, Chairman, Dumfries and Galloway Health Board.
- Lieutenant Colonel Peter Middleton Milo. For public services in the City of London.
- Albert Moore, Member, Newcastle upon Tyne City Council.
- Lieutenant Colonel John Arthur George Moore. For services to Ski-ing.
- Elizabeth Cecilia, Lady More O'Ferrall, lately Chairman, Guinness Trust.
- David John Morton, Lecturer in Education, University of Nottingham.
- Berkeley Alfred Mowlem, Principal Professional and Technology Officer, Department of Transport.
- Derek Peter Muir, Chairman and Chief Executive, Vickers Marine Engineering Division, Edinburgh.
- David Rickards Baskerville Mynors, Vice-Chairman, Oxfordshire Health Authority.
- Elizabeth Anne Nairne. For Political Service.
- Cecil Nimmons, General Manager, Belfast Harbour Commissioners.
- Percy John Norris, lately Chapter Agent, Canterbury Cathedral.
- Barbara Oldham, Deputy President, Cheshire County Branch, British Red Cross Society.
- Harry Stanley Orton, Consultant Orthodontist, Kingston Hospital and Royal Dental Hospital, London.
- Robert Frederick James Parsons. For Political and Public Service.
- John Mower Alexander Paterson, DL. For public services in Buckinghamshire.
- John Bramwell Paton. Director of Horticulture, Commonwealth War Graves Commission.
- Thomas William Saunderson Patton, Member, Belfast City Council.
- James Beaumont Pendle. For Political and Public Service.
- Alan John Pike, Senior Principal, Department of the Environment.
- Bernard Francis Plummer, Principal Scientific Officer, Ministry of Defence.
- Jeremy James Richard Pope, Joint Managing Director, Eldridge Pope plc.
- William Ramsden, Managing Director, Rank Taylor Hobson Ltd.
- Elizabeth Raybould. For services to Nursing Education.
- Philip Reasbeck, Chief Scientist and Director of Research, Lucas Industries plc.
- Geoffrey Porter Rich, Editor, South Wales Echo.
- John Rishbeth, Reader in Plant Pathology, Botany School, University of Cambridge.
- Ian Crake Robey, Chairman, Cakebread Robey plc.
- Virendra Sahai, Regional Architect, South Western Regional Health Authority.
- Joseph Stanley Salt, Superintending Engineer, Surrey County Council.
- Michael Vincent Salter, Inspector, Department of Education and Science.
- Geoffrey Frank Sarjeant, Chairman, British Literacy Committee.
- Robert Saunders, Director, South Western Farmers Ltd.
- William Alfred Scott. For Political and Public Service.
- Roger Douglas Self. For services to Hockey.
- Henry Samuel Sharpley. For Political and Public Service.
- Harold Watkins Shaw. For services to Music.
- James Brian Shaw. For services to the Pensions Appeal Tribunals.
- Frank Simmons, lately Principal, Lord Chancellor's Department.
- Clifford Joseph Smith. For Political Service.
- Mervyn Philip Smith, Establishment Officer, Natural Environment Research Council.
- Leslie James Soane, Managing Director, Reorganisation, British Railways Board.
- Terence John Soutar, Principal, HM Stationery Office.
- Peter Stalker, Partner, Kirk McClure & Morton, Consulting Engineers, Belfast.
- John Henry Starkey. For Political Service.
- Edwin Frederick Reed Stearn, Principal, Brooksby Agricultural College and Chief Agricultural Education Officer for Leicestershire.
- Charles Paul Joseph Steinitz. For services to the London Bach Society.
- Stephen James Stewart. For Political and Public Service.
- Marianne Straub, Textile Designer and Weaver.
- Heather May Farquhar Swift. For Political and Public Service.
- David John Thomas, Headmaster, Aberaeron Comprehensive School.
- Bertram Eric Twyford, lately Clerk and Chief Executive, Guildford Borough Council.
- Victor Howard Usher. For Political and Public Service.
- Edward James Alfred Venn. For services to the blind.
- Stephen Baly Vincent. For Political and Public Service.
- William Patrick Vinten, Director, Vinten Group plc. For Services to Export.
- Bernard Coultas Wade, Official Receiver, Department of Trade and Industry.
- Rosalind Wade (Mrs. R. H. Seymour), Editor, Contemporary Review.
- John Thomas Walford, General Secretary, Multiple Sclerosis Society of the United Kingdom.
- Sidney Charles Walker. For services to the training of Mining Engineers.
- Stanley Charles Wallin, Principal Scientific Officer, Department of Trade and Industry.
- John Murray Watterson, Headmaster, Plas Gwynant Outdoor, Social and Residential Education Centre.
- Austen Ian Welch. For Political and Public Service.
- Neville Joseph Whitehead, Manager, Great Britain Athletics Team.
- Howard Whitehouse, Director, Whitehouse Brothers (Fuels) Ltd.
- Hugh Norman Williams, Chief Executive, Community Transport.
- Arthur Leslie Woleendale, Managing Director, South Wales Switchgear Ltd.
- Angus John Howell Wood, Area Director, Manchester, Department of Employment.
- Arthur Murdoch Mactaggart Wood, General Secretary, Royal Scottish Society for the Prevention of Cruelty to Children.
- Douglas Graham Wood, MC. For services to elderly people and disabled people in Scotland.
- Ian William Young, Headteacher, Hedworthfield Comprehensive School, Jarrow.

Diplomatic Service and Overseas List

- John Benda. For services to British commercial interests in Turkey.
- John Paul A'Court Bergne, lately First Secretary, HM Embassy, Athens.
- Erie Blackburn, QPM, CPM, Deputy Commissioner, Royal Hong Kong Police Force.
- Lieutenant Colonel Derek Hurst Boydell (Retd.) For services to ex-Servicemen in Dublin.
- Peter Braithwaite. For services to British commercial and community interests in Indonesia.
- Edward Charles Brooks, Chief Secretary, Turks and Caicos Islands.
- John Chan Cho-tak, Administrative Officer, Security Branch, Hong Kong.
- Chen Yuan-chu. For public services in Hong Kong.
- Stephen Cheong Kam-chuen. For public services in Hong Kong.
- Robert John Chitty. For services to British commercial interests in Moscow.
- Norman Edward Cole, lately First Secretary (Commercial), British High Commission, Lusaka.
- Ian Arthur Naunton Cook, lately Commander, Police Mobile Force, Vanuatu.
- Michael Desmond Crone, lately Census Adviser, Government of Zimbabwe.
- Charles Michael Danino, DFC. For public and community services in Gibraltar.
- Bruce Errington Dawson. For services to British commercial interests in Portugal.
- James Richard Easton Dobson, lately International Staff, NATO, Brussels.
- Norman Dyson Duckett. First Secretary, HM Embassy, Washington.
- Colin Dyer, First Secretary (Commercial), HM Embassy, Copenhagen.
- James Henry Forrest, MBE. For services to British aviation and community interests in Kuwait.
- Cyril Arthur Holmes, HM Consul, British Consulate, Genoa.
- Hu Fa-kuang. For public services in Hong Kong.
- Vernon Lionel Jackson, lately Principal Secretary, Health and Education Department, Cayman Islands.
- Lieutenant Colonel Inver John Cameron Laver (Retd.). For services to British defence sales in Jordan.
- David Eugene William Lines, Chairman, Housing Corporation, Bermuda.
- David Steele Marler, lately British Council Representative, Cyprus.
- James Reay Medley. For services to British commercial interests in Seoul.
- Robert James Miller, lately HM Consul, British Consulate-General, Johannesburg.
- Professor James Carrie Milln. For services to technical education in Lesotho.
- Reginald Ewing Eugene Ming, MBE. For services to the community in Bermuda.
- James Joseph Edward Morrin, QPM, CPM, Director, Special Branch, Royal Hong Kong Police Force.
- Dr. John Latimer Munby, British Council Representative, Singapore.
- Gerald Francis Rance, MBE, British High Commissioner, Tonga.
- Christopher John Skinner, lately Chief Education Officer, Solomon Islands.
- Anthony Thompson. For services to British commercial interests in California.
- James Howard Thompson, lately Assistant Cultural Attaché, British Council, Washington.
- Ian George Thow, lately Administrator, Ascension Island.
- John Tuby. For services to British commercial interests in France.
- Harold John Millar Ward. For services to British commercial interests in Australia.
- Cyril Neville Watson. For services to shipyard development in Singapore.
- David Dale Wilkinson. For services to British aviation interests in Japan.
- Anthony David Wood, Honorary British Consul, Kigali, Rwanda.
- Maurice Zinkin. For services on the Economic and Social Committee of the European Communities, Brussels.

Australian States

State of Queensland

- Elizabeth Anne Stuart Abell, Chief Nursing Officer, Department of Health.
- Thomas Sydney Charles Atkinson, QPM, Deputy Commissioner of Police.
- Herbert Atherton Griffiths. For services to the Toowoomba Community.
- Thomas George Matthews. For services to rural industry.
- Donald Crawford Watson. For services to North Queensland, and the sugar industry.

State of Tasmania

- Emeritus Professor Gordon Henry Newstead. For services to the power industry.

==== Member of the Order of the British Empire (MBE) ====
Military Division

Royal Navy

- Lieutenant Commander Roger Collinson.
- Lieutenant Commander Michael John Holden Craig.
- Lieutenant Commander Peter Rowland Davies.
- Lieutenant Commander John Francis Dorrington.
- Fleet Chief Weapon Engineering Mechanic (R) Raymond Gilbert, M908232U.
- Lieutenant Commander William Alfred Goodchild.
- Acting Lieutenant Commander John William Graham.
- Lieutenant Glen Thomas Mackie.
- Lieutenant (C.S.) David William Moore.
- Lieutenant Commander (S.C.C.) Michael Frederick William Overbury, Royal Naval Reserve.
- Fleet Chief Steward John Arthur Partington, D069112J.
- Lieutenant Commander Brian Frederick Prendergast.
- Lieutenant Commander (S.C.C.) Cyril Herbert Watson, Royal Naval Reserve.
- Lieutenant Commander George Nigel Wells.

Army

- Major Colin Joseph Andrews (494168), Army Physical Training Corps (now retired).
- Acting Major Henry William Appleby (487188), CBE. Combined Cadet Force, Territorial Army (now retired).
- Major Robert William Charles Terence Barbour, TD, (489121), Intelligence Corps, Territorial Army.
- 23858731 Warrant Officer Class 1 Ratu Meli Basu, The Duke of Wellington's Regiment (West Riding) (now discharged).
- Major (now Honorary Lieutenant Colonel) Brian Baty, MM, (480027), The Parachute Regiment (now retired).
- 24046911 Warrant Officer Class 2 Christopher Richard Brown, Corps of Royal Military Police.
- Major (Staff Quartermaster) Brian Douglas Casbolt (498817), Royal Army Ordnance Corps.
- Major Peter John Darrington (499280), Royal Army Medical Corps.
- Captain Victor Clifford Llewellyn Davies, TD, (496985), Royal Monmouthshire Royal Engineers (Militia), Territorial Army.
- Captain (Quartermaster) David Dawes (503676), The King's Regiment.
- 23901371 Warrant Officer Class 2 Geoffrey Fairfax, The Queen's Regiment, Territorial Army.
- Acting Major Kenneth Cyril Farren (404784), Army Cadet Force, Territorial Army.
- Major (Ordnance Executive Officer) John Keith Fellows (494636), Royal Army Ordnance Corps.
- Major (Quartermaster) Raymond William Hall (494924), The Light Infantry.
- Captain Thomas Henry Hughes (498828), Royal Regiment of Artillery, Territorial Army (now retired).
- Major (now Lieutenant Colonel) William Keith Hardwick (472747), Royal Army Educational Corps.
- Major David Martin Hay (417238), The Royal Scots (The Royal Regiment).
- Major Michael Arthur Westley Head (475167), Intelligence Corps.
- Major Timothy Hugh Holbech (488443), Grenadier Guards.
- Major John Howard Charles James (406417), The Royal Regiment of Wales (24th/41st Foot).
- Major (now Lieutenant Colonel) Christopher Kearns (482763), The Queen's Lancashire Regiment.
- Major Louis Patrick Lillywhite (486287), Royal Army Medical Corps.
- 24040761 Warrant Officer Class 1 Ronald James Charles Mackenzie, Scots Guards.
- Major John Christopher Dale Moseley (407971), Royal Regiment of Artillery (now retired).
- Major (Gurkha Commissioned Officer) Narbu Lama (456326), 2nd King Edward VII's Own Gurkha Rifles (The Sirmoor Rifles).
- Lieutenant (Acting Captain) Douglas Edwin Naylor (519492), Royal Regiment of Artillery.
- Major (Brevet Lieutenant Colonel) Peter Newton (479712), Special Air Service Regiment, Territorial Army.
- Major Michael George Orum (484225), The Prince of Wales's Own Regiment of Yorkshire.
- Major John Richard Pawson (489577), Corps of Royal Engineers.
- Major (Quartermaster) David Kendrick Proom (501733), The Gloucestershire Regiment.
- 23947652 Warrant Officer Class 2 Eric Ernest Robinson, Royal Army Ordnance Corps.
- Captain (Acting Major) David Ronksley (508760), Corps of Royal Engineers.
- Major Guy Nicholas Ranulph Sayle (480607), Welsh Guards.
- Captain (Quartermaster) Edmund Sheen (470710), The Duke of Lancaster's Own Yeomanry, Territorial Army.
- 23675386 Warrant Officer Class 2 Stephen Michael Sims, Royal Corps of Signals.
- Major Malcolm Roy Stewart Skeat (490721) Corps of Royal Electrical and Mechanical Engineers, Territorial Army.
- Captain (Quartermaster) Malcolm Christopher Keith Smart (505450), Royal Corps of Signals.
- Major Prynne William Snell (472622), Intelligence Corps.
- Major Francis Richard Steer (482843), Royal Army Ordnance Corps.
- Major Michael Edwin Alan Syms (488494), Royal Corps of Transport.
- Major John Miles Templer (480415), 17th/21st Lancers.
- Major Peter Errington Townsend (481883), Corps of Royal Military Police.
- 23993475 Warrant Officer Class 2 Colin Kinnaird Walker, Corps of Royal Engineers.

Overseas Award

- Major Nicholas Ward Woolmington, ED, Royal Hong Kong Regiment (The Volunteers).

Royal Air Force

- Acting Squadron Leader John William Billings (1260097), Royal Air Force Volunteer Reserve (Training).
- Squadron Leader Gordon James Blackburn (506615).
- Squadron Leader Christopher Charles Nicholas Burwell (8021052).
- Squadron Leader Timothy Fawbert Carter, AFC, (584533).
- Squadron Leader Kevan Francis Daykin (5201708).
- Squadron Leader (now Acting Wing Commander) David Ruxton Garrow Forsyth (608850).
- Squadron Leader Walter Watt Hill (2486653).
- Squadron Leader (now Acting Wing Commander) John Stuart Hocknell (508411).
- Squadron Leader John Frederick Leslie Pearce (579161), (Retired).
- Squadron Leader (now Acting Wing Commander) David Colin Smith (4231459).
- Squadron Leader (now Acting Wing Commander) Philip Oliver Sturley (5200847).
- Flight Lieutenant (now Acting Squadron Leader) John Stephen Barry (1944696).
- Flight Lieutenant George McDougall Smith (5201652).
- Flight Lieutenant James Stewart (592306).
- Warrant Officer Dennis Michael Allen (G2527164).
- Warrant Officer James Joseph Duffy, BEM, (D4007990).
- Warrant Officer Ernest Percival Henshall (X2280883).
- Warrant Officer David Charles Hunter (S3518586).
- Warrant Officer Maurice Masters Jeffery (B0592097).
- Warrant Officer Robert Elwyn Vaughan (V3116067).
- Master Navigator Anthony David Melton (Y1814014).

Overseas Award

- Warrant Officer Peter James Hayward (T1933236), Royal Air Force. For services with the British Embassy, Cairo.

Civil Division

- Pauline Acklam, Chairman, Barnsley and District Council for Voluntary Service.
- Joan Philomena Adams, Prison Visitor, HM Prison Holloway.
- Agnes Grieve Patrick Allan, Headteacher, Ashcraig School, Glasgow.
- Geddie Angus Anderson, DSC, lately Manager, Gravure Printing Plant, D. C. Thomson & Co. Ltd., Dundee.
- Mary Edwina Anderson, Member, Board of Visitors, HM Prison Magilligan.
- William Fisher Anderson, Chairman, Scottish Fishermen's Organisation Ltd.
- Colin Charles Andrews, Senior Executive Officer, Board of Customs and Excise.
- Lieutenant Commander John Peter Angell, DSC, Royal Navy (Retd.), lately Superintendent, Ashdown Forest and Clerk to the Conservators of Ashdown Forest.
- Samuel Jack Victor Arditti, Chief Commandant, Cheshire Special Constabulary.
- Michael Armstrong. For Political and Public Service.
- Eleanor Kathleen Arnison. For services to young people in Loughborough.
- Margaret MacCallum Bailey, lately Committee Secretary, British Veterinary Association.
- Josephina Alys Banner (Miss Josephina De Vasconcellas). For services to the community in Cumbria.
- Marion Barrett, Higher Executive Officer, Management and Personnel Office, Cabinet Office.
- Helen Roger Yeaman Small Bates. For Political and Public Service.
- Susan Adela Belgrave, Chairman, Voluntary Reading Help Scheme.
- Albert Bennett, Chairman, South West Regional Council, Trades Union Congress.
- Jonathan Bennington, Inspector, Department of Employment.
- Henry Walter Benoy, Under Secretary, Association of District Councils.
- Thomas Albert Bird, Higher Executive Officer, Department of Health and Social Security.
- Sarah Jane Bishop, lately County Superintendent, Nottinghamshire St. John Ambulance Brigade.
- Joyce Black, Inspector, Board of Inland Revenue.
- Shirley Ann Blew, Senior Nurse Manager, St. Stephens Hospital, Victoria Health Authority.
- Barbara Anne Bloomfield, Senior Research Officer, National Foundation for Educational Research.
- John Acland Bonner, Collector (Higher Grade), Board of Inland Revenue.
- Geoffrey Arthur Booth, Senior Scientific Officer, Ministry of Defence.
- Edgar Graham Botham, Higher Executive Officer, Department of Employment.
- Jane Hope Bown, Photographer, The Observer.
- Anthony Frank Boxell, Workshop Supervisor, Institute of Oceanographic Sciences.
- Peter Thomas Brabbs, District Commandant, Metropolitan Special Constabulary.
- Maurice Stanley Breese. For services to Road Safety in Lewes, East Sussex.
- George Henry Broadbent. For architectural services to the North and East Lancashire Association for the Deaf.
- Joseph Henry Bromley. For services to local government and the community in Merthyr Tydfil.
- Catherine Garvie Brown, lately Deputy to the Representative in the United Kingdom of the UN High Commissioner for Refugees.
- Charles William Brown, Higher Executive Officer, Department of Health and Social Security.
- Elizabeth Brown, lately District Nursing Sister, Kinlochewe.
- Norman Gough Brown. For services to the community in the Isle of Man.
- Rodney Mark Browne. For Political and Public Service.
- Robert Buchanan, lately Secretary, St. Andrews Links Trust and Links Management Committee.
- Patrick Aidan Butcher, Professional and Technology Officer I, Department of the Environment.
- Muriel Callis, Dental Surgery Assistant, Sheffield.
- Arthur William Capers. For service to the community in Enderby, Leicester.
- Harold Carney, Inspector, Board of Inland Revenue.
- Ronald Edward Cash, Secretary, National Association of Steel Stockholders.
- Captain John Lothrop Chace, lately Marine Service Officer (Deck) Grade 1, Ministry of Defence.
- Beryl Constance Chandler. For services to the community in Smethwick, West Midlands.
- Alan Herbert Cherry, Chairman and Managing Director, Countryside Properties plc.
- Constantine Chrysostomos Christodoulou, lately Customer Services Officer, British Airways.
- Archibald Clark, Farm Manager, Campbeltown, Argyll.
- Irene Mabel Clark. For Political and Public Service.
- Harold Clarke, Works Director, Track Marshall Ltd.
- Kenneth Norman Harlow Clements. Treasurer, London Retail Meat Traders' Association Inc.
- Maria Nora Cleugh. For services to refugees in West Sussex.
- Thomas Coates, Principal Careers Officer, Sheffield Metropolitan District Council.
- Herbert Felix Cobb, lately Senior Executive Officer, Lord Chancellor's Department.
- Squadron Leader Vernon John Grenville Cole. For Political Service.
- Henry William Collett, Headteacher, Sunninghill County Primary School, Bolton.
- Audrey Collins, Member, Langbaurgh Borough Council and Cleveland County Council.
- Sister Leonore Stanley Cooke. For services to medicine in Tower Hamlets.
- George Frederick Cornish, Fleet Engineer, Provincial Bus Co. Ltd.
- William James Corps. For services to Richmondshire District Council.
- Moira Crawford, Senior Executive Officer, Ministry of Defence.
- Norman John Cripps, Executive Engineer, Southampton Telephone Area, British Telecom plc.
- Eric John Crofts, Organiser, Acorn Camps, National Trust.
- John Crudass, Chief Reserves Officer, Royal Society for Protection of Birds.
- Audrey Ethel Crump, lately Nurse Adviser, Lewisham and North Southwark Health Authority.
- James Henry Llewellyn Cullimore. For services to farming in Bassaleg, Gwent.
- Agnes Curran, lately Governor, Dungavel, Scottish Prison Service.
- Christopher Keith Curtis, Secretary/Treasurer, Parkfield Approved Probation Hostel, Manchester.
- Ruth Cusack. For services to Norwich Citizens' Advice Bureau.
- Roy Daines, lately Head Operator Service and Defence Group, North-East Regional HQ, British Telecom plc.
- Kenneth Mathieson Dalglish. For services to Association Football.
- Gabriel Francis Davey, lately Chairman, St. Agnes' Youth Club, Belfast.
- Majorie Helen Davies. For Political and Public Service.
- Stanley Davies, Senior District Official, Transport and General Workers' Union.
- Thomas Frank Davies. For charitable services in Shropshire.
- Eric George Dawe, Senior Executive Officer, Department of Health and Social Security.
- Alec Dawson. For services to Science Education.
- James William Dawson, Chairman, Turriff Community Council.
- Ruth Therese Mary De Stefani, Senior Nurse, Westminster Hospital, Victoria Health Authority.
- John Colton Dennett, Chairman, Abbeyfield Buckinghamshire Society.
- Lieutenant Colonel John Edward Dent (Retired), Export Sales Executive, Dynamics Group, British Aerospace plc. For services to Export.
- Frederick John Derham, Chief Projects Engineer, Aish & Co. Ltd, Poole.
- Thomas Rodgers Dick, Chairman, Consarc Engineering Ltd.
- Peter Neville Dingley, Director, Peter Dingley Gallery.
- Rose Kathleen Dixon. For Political Service.
- Eva Mary Dodds. For Political Service.
- Thomas Arthur Dooling, Higher Executive Officer, Department of Education and Science.
- John Milne Dow, lately Administrator, Primary Care, Argyll and Clyde Health Board.
- John Edwin Drewett, Valuation Clerk (Higher Grade), Board of Inland Revenue.
- Alfred Charles Duff, Export Sales Manager, Vine Products Ltd. For Services to Export.
- Brenda Mary Dulley, Executive Officer, Department of Health and Social Security.
- Muriel Olive Easter, lately Teacher of Braille and English, Chorleywood College for the Blind.
- George Frederick Edghtll, Clerical Officer, Home Office.
- Siegfried Elbogen, Medical Officer, Moorfields Eye Hospital.
- John Elliot, lately Company Marketing Services Manager, Batchelors Foods Ltd.
- Stafford Malcolm Ellis, Company Design Consultant, Marconi Avionics Ltd., Rochester. For services to Export.
- Stuart Emery, Managing Director, Clifton & Baird Ltd., Johnstone.
- Arthur Raymond Etheridge, Higher Executive Officer, Department of Health and Social Security.
- Walter Ferrier. For services to the community in Cleveland.
- Charles Fredrick Fisher. For services to the Loughborough Band.
- Oliver Stanley Ford. For services to School Sports.
- William Arthur Agnew Forrester, Senior Executive Officer, Board of Inland Revenue.
- Michael Gordon Foster. For services to the community in North Yorkshire.
- Elizabeth Marjorie Foulkes, Partner, Colwyn Foulkes & Partners.
- Martin Frederick Francis, Higher Executive Officer, Board of Customs and Excise.
- Reginald Frederick Freeman, lately Director, Birmingham Friendship Housing Association.
- Peggy May Fullman, Personal Secretary, Kent County Constabulary.
- Barbara Eileen Furze. For Political Service.
- Winifred Mary Genner, Training Officer, Kent Branch, British Red Cross Society.
- William Gilbey, Head Postmaster, Crewe, Midlands Postal Board, The Post Office.
- Ian Clewes Gilmour, Fanner and Livestock Breeder, Maybole, Ayrshire.
- Elsie May Gover, Assistant Director of Nursing, Gloucestershire Royal Hospital, Gloucester Health Authority.
- Gordon John Greenland, Inspector, Board of Inland Revenue.
- Bettina Greenway, lately Headmistress, Ridgeway Special School, Warwick.
- Edith Mary Ann Griffiths, Senior Executive Officer, Department of Employment.
- John Malcolm Freswick Groat, Secretary, Longhope Lifeboat Station, Royal National Lifeboat Institution.
- Audrey Muriel Grundy, Executive Officer, Board of Customs and Excise.
- Alwyne Haley, lately Energy Manager, North Yorkshire Area, National Coal Board.
- Samuel Hallsworth, Higher Executive Officer, Department of Employment.
- May Adeline Hanbury. For services to the community in Gloucestershire.
- Laurence Hanson. For Political and Public Service.
- Virginia Mary Elizabeth Hardy, Secretary, Northern Ireland, British Broadcasting Corporation.
- Thomas Mayne Reid Harshaw, Youth Adviser, North Eastern Education and Library Board, Northern Ireland.
- Dennis Charles Alfred Hawthorn, Training Officer, Neil & Spencer Ltd. For services to Export.
- William Hendry. For services to the community in Hampshire.
- John Alexander Henning, President, Northern Ireland Amateur Athletics Association.
- Dennis Sidney Hilling, lately Clerical Officer, Department of Health and Social Security.
- Bernard Thomas Holcombe, Company Technical Director, Eldridge Pope & Co. plc.
- Thomas Paul John Holley. For services to Rugby Football in Wales.
- Michael Hope, Business Counsellor, Small Firms Service.
- Eric Edward Hopkins, Engineer and Ship Surveyor (Grade II), Department of Transport.
- Teresa (Tessa) Horton. For Political Service.
- Barry Houghton, Managing Director, Rainford Metals Ltd.
- Harold William Charles Hubbard, Associate, G. Maunsell & Partners, Consulting Engineers.
- Kenneth Hubbard, lately Higher Executive Officer, Department of Employment.
- Richard John Humphries, Managing Director, Humphries Weaving Company.
- George Hutchinson. For services to Music.
- Christiana Louise Hutchison, Member, Ayrshire and Arran Health Board.
- James Jackson, Director of Environmental Health, City of Glasgow.
- Sidney Jackson, Superintendent, Royal Ulster Constabulary.
- Florence Mary Jarman, District Nursing Sister, Islington Health District.
- Denis Arthur Jarrett, Civilian Chairman, No. 2230 Squadron, Air Training Corps.
- Jacqueline Violet Elizabeth Jefferies, Director, The Mental After-Care Association.
- Eileen Mary Jeffries, Staff Officer, Department of Education for Northern Ireland.
- William Watkin Jenkins. For Political and Public Service.
- Denis Frederick Jessopp, Associate Director, Merthyr Factory, Hoover plc.
- Albert Edward Johnson, Printing Services Manager, Department of Trade and Industry.
- Andrew Jenkyn Jones. For services to the community and farming in Brecon, Powys.
- Gwilym Jones, lately Senior Executive Officer, Welsh Office.
- Henry Roy Stanley Jones, Principal Social Services Officer, Hertfordshire County Council.
- Josef Josten, Political Journalist and Author.
- Peter Waring Jowett. For services to disabled people in Newcastle upon Tyne.
- Peter Everard Kay, Senior Executive Officer, Department of Employment.
- Paul Roderick Noel Kellar, Research Director, Quantel Ltd.
- Peter Frederick Kellie. For Political and Public Service.
- John Alexander Kennedy, General Manager, Scotland Field Aircraft Services (East Midlands) Ltd.
- Sheelah Hyacinth Kennedy, Senior Nursing Officer, Musgrave Park Hospital, Belfast.
- Thomas Sidney William King, Professional and Technology Officer II, Commonwealth War Graves Commission.
- Harold Ernest Kite, Chief Road Safety Officer, London Borough of Hammersmith and Fulham.
- Charlotte Regina Kratz, Associate Editor, Nursing Times.
- Donald Iain Thomas Laing, For services to the community in the Isle of Lewis.
- Charles John Beverley Lane, Cartographic Manager, Ordnance Survey.
- Winifred Law, lately Senior Teacher and Head of Music, Newlands School, Maidenhead.
- James Richard Leggett, Secretary for Professional Practice, The Royal Institution of Chartered Surveyors.
- Christopher Archibald Gordon Le May, Scientist Study Group, Central Research Laboratories, Thorn EMI plc.
- Alice Lorna Trehame, Lady Lewis. For services to the community in Hertfordshire.
- Winifred Evelyn Lewis. For services to the community in Cardiff.
- Barbara Sara Lipsker, Director, Glencraig Trust.
- Helen Russell Low, Secretary, Kirkcaldy Branch, Scottish Mental Health Association.
- Squadron Leader Sutherland Young Mackechnie (Retired), General Medical Practitioner, HMS Gannet, Ayrshire.
- Margaret Rosemary Isabella Mackenzie. For services to the Tain Museum.
- Atholl Hutchinson Maclaren, General Medical Practitioner, Nottinghamshire.
- Finlay Milne Macrae, Professional and Technology Officer I, Forestry Commission.
- George Arthur Maguire, Supplies Officer (Fuel), Northern Ireland Electricity Service.
- Peter Howard Manning, Senior Surveyor, Ministry of Agriculture, Fisheries and Food.
- Susie Helen Manton. For services to the community in Strachur.
- Rex Martin, Assistant Chief Officer, West Midlands Fire Brigade.
- James Masters. For services to the Drake Fellowship.
- Frances Mary Maxwell. For services to the Royal British Legion in Devon.
- Jacqueline Margaret Anne Mayo. For services to Army Families.
- Hugh Samuel McAllister. For Political and Public Service.
- Thomas John McGowan, Chief Superintendent, Royal Ulster Constabulary.
- Ann McMullan, Director and Secretary, Electrical Association for Women.
- Ronald McWatters, Superintendent, Telephone Terminal Production, STC Telecommunications plc.
- James Miller, Member, Kyle and Carrick District Council.
- Denis Frank Abra Mills. For services to mentally disabled people, particularly in Newark.
- Arthur Patton Mitchell, Senior Physiotherapist, Erne Hospital, Enniskillen.
- Handel Mason Morgan, lately Head Teacher, Llangefni County Primary School, Anglesey.
- Duncan Matheson Morison. For services to Gaelic Music.
- Ernest Howard Morris. For service to the community in Leeds.
- Myrtle Vera Moss, lately County Organiser, Norfolk, Women's Royal Voluntary Service.
- James Macgregor Munn, Director of Recreation and Community Services, Birmingham City Council.
- Annie Alberta Murdoch, Deputy Principal, Northern Ireland Court Service.
- Grace Irene Napier, Senior Welfare Officer, Strathclyde Police.
- George Newhall. For services to the community in Stornoway, Isle of Lewis.
- Stanley Oliver Newman, Registrar of Births, Deaths and Marriages and Deputy Superintendent, Registrar, Thanet Registration District.
- Edward Victor Nicholls, Clerical Officer, Ministry of Defence.
- Rose Isabel Norton, Executive Officer, Ministry of Defence.
- Alec Freeman Nutter. For services to mentally disabled people in Gloucestershire.
- Ellen Edith Parkes, Secretary, Poole Division, Soldiers', Sailors' and Airmen's Families Association.
- Dorothy Anderson Parsons, President, Friends of the Eastbourne Hospitals, Eastbourne Health Authority.
- Leslie Wescott Lownds Pateman. For services to the Royal Air Forces Association in the South West.
- Derek Charles Kilminster Pearce, Higher Scientific Officer, National Physical Laboratory, Department of Trade and Industry.
- Susanne Pearson, Headteacher, Grace Owen Nursery School, Sheffield.
- William Charles Perry, Deputy Chief Officer, Surrey Fire Brigade.
- Hillis Bruce Charles Pink, Higher Executive Officer, Board of Inland Revenue.
- Charles Llewellyn Pocock, External Public Relations Manager, Remploy Ltd.
- Anna Barr Wilson Pollock, Executive Officer, Crown Office.
- Anne Elizabeth Power. For services to the Priority Estates Project, particularly in Tulse Hill.
- Arthur Priest, Chairman, Manchester Industrial Relations Society.
- Helen Raine, lately Teacher, Pencaitland Primary School.
- Roy Geoffrey Rattey, Deputy Principal, Northern Ireland Civil Service.
- Patience Mary Reed, Director of Nursing Services, Royal Orthopaedic Hospital, Birmingham Health Authority.
- James Reid, lately Personnel Officer, Shildon Works, British Rail Engineering Limited.
- Patricia Renouf, lately Organiser, Bailiwick of Jersey, Women's Royal Voluntary Service.
- Henry James Ridley, Farm Manager, Stockbridge, Hampshire.
- Marjorie Brenda Rintoul. For Political and Public Service.
- John Hindle Ritchie, Director of Development, Merseyside Development Corporation.
- Elspet Louise Rivett. For services to the community in Wiltshire.
- Marjorie Irene Roberts, Headteacher, Clapham Church of England Primary School, North Yorkshire.
- George Timothy Lewis Rose. For Political and Public Service.
- Alec Rothery. For services to the Royal Society for the Blind, Bristol.
- Ailsa Maxwell Rushbrooke, Chairman, Executive Committee, Independent Adoption Service.
- William Rust, Technical Director, Simon Carves Ltd.
- James Herbert Salt. For Political Service.
- Tessa Sanderson. For services to Athletics.
- James Patrick Savage, Associate Director, Training and Manpower Development, British Mining Consultants Ltd. For services to Export.
- Gordon Scott, Higher Executive Officer, Department of Health and Social Security.
- Catherine Carmichael Sharp, Member, Fife Health Board.
- John Proctor Bennoch Sherriff, Editor, Commercial Motor.
- Alfred William Shipman, lately District Commissioner, Surrey Heath Scout Association.
- Hariprasad Mohanlal Shukla, Community Relations Officer, Tyne and Wear Community Relations Council.
- Frederick James Albert Shults, Secretary, Institute of Wastes Management.
- Emily Hannah Simmonds, Vice-President, National Association for Maternal and Child Welfare.
- Henry Skehin, Superintendent, Royal Ulster Constabulary.
- Richard Henry Slaughter, MC, Chairman, Recruitment, Education and Training Committee, IRC Confederation of British Wool Textiles.
- Elizabeth Scott Potter Smart, lately Senior Executive Officer, Overseas Development Administration.
- Douglas Alan Smith, lately Operations Manager (East), Eastern Counties Omnibus Co. Ltd.
- Paul Louis Smith, Senior Chief Maxillo-Facial Technician, Wordsley Hospital, Stourbridge.
- Philip James Smith, For services to the National Association of Retired Police Officers.
- Commander Francis Gilbert Carington Smyth, Royal Navy (Retired), Staff Officer, Naval Control of Shipping in the Humber.
- Thomas Smyth, Regional Secretary, Union of Construction, Allied Trades and Technicians, Northern Ireland.
- Lawrence Bond Spear. For services to the Devon and Cornwall Housing Association.
- Alexander Spence, Mayor of Ballymena, Co. Antrim.
- Alan Spencer, Secretary and Treasurer, Association of Sea Fisheries Committees.
- Edward Francis Spencer, Business Sales Executive, Plessey Connectors Ltd.
- Stephen Terence Spooner, Senior Scientific Officer, Ministry of Defence.
- Roger David Spragg, Foreign and Commonwealth Office.
- Eric Staniforth, Managing Director, SISIS Equipment (Macclesfield) Ltd.
- Roger Stewart. For Political Service.
- Samuel Stewart, Unit Manager, National Car Parks Ltd., Aldergrove Airport.
- Ivor Cecil Stoneman, Superintendent, Main Drainage, South West Water Authority.
- Neil Fraser Stuart, Tax Officer (Higher Grade), Board of Inland Revenue.
- Denis Stubbs, Headmaster, St. Mary's C. of E. Primary School, Dover.
- Joan Patricia Love Sullivan. Lately Head of Counselling, The National Marriage Guidance Council.
- Mary Winifred Sutcliffe. For services to local government in Hampshire.
- Patricia Mary Sykes, Staff Nurse, Northampton General Hospital, Northampton Health Authority.
- Douglas Taylor, Staff Officer to HM Chief Inspector of Constabulary.
- Richard Edward Scott Taylor. For services to music education.
- Thomas Taylor. For services to sport for disabled people.
- Cecil Thomas, Head Teacher, Crickhowell County Primary School.
- Gwendoline Ethel Thomas, Health Visitor, Bourne End, Wycombe Health Authority.
- Leonard Ivor Thomas, Local Officer I, Department of Health and Social Security.
- Eric Thompson, Senior Representative (Overseas), Rolls-Royce Ltd.
- Alexander Stewart Thomson, Co-ordinator, Special Employment Schemes, British Waterways Board.
- Elspeth Townend. For services to Durham Citizens' Advice Bureau.
- Eric Neave Tuxworth, Principal Lecturer, Huddersfield Polytechnic.
- John Joseph Upton, Senior Executive Officer, Department of Transport.
- Dorothea Eileen Waldman, Executive Officer, National Maritime Museum.
- George Oxley Walker, Terminal Manager, Natural Gas Terminal, Bacton, British Gas Corporation.
- Sidney Douglas Wallen, Distribution Manager, Distribution Department, The Services Sound and Vision Corporation.
- Jack Leonard Ward, Senior Executive Officer, Home Office.
- Sydney John Phillips Warren, County Organising Secretary for Somerset and Devon, National Association of Boys' Clubs.
- Anne Warrington. For services to the Diocese of Norwich.
- Oliver Roy Webb. For Political and Public Service.
- Dennis Welch, Manager, Empire Sports Club, St. Paul's, Bristol.
- Dorothy Evelyn Wells, Higher Scientific Officer, Ministry of Agriculture, Fisheries and Food.
- Ruth Lilian Wells, Senior Library Assistant, University of Sheffield.
- Max Westerman, Chief Commissioning Engineer, National Nuclear Corporation Ltd.
- Harold Whitaker, Site Services Manager, Robert Jenkins & Co. Ltd.
- Brian Abraham White, Senior Master, All Saints Comprehensive Church of England School, Weymouth.
- John Edwin Whttehouse. For services to the Railway Convalescent Homes.
- Douglas Allan Wilkie, Chairman, Calderdale, Kirklees and Wakefield War Pensions Committee.
- Desmond John Wilkinson, Chief Legal Executive, Telford Development Corporation.
- Joan Margaret Williams, lately Deputy Director, Department of Extramural Studies, Birmingham University.
- Kenneth Frank Wills, Managing Director, Saunders-Roe Developments Ltd.
- Robert Dunlop Wilson, lately Safety Consultant, National Semiconductor (UK) Ltd., Greenock.
- Pauline Frances Winks, lately Senior Executive Officer, Ministry of Defence.
- Doris Mary Wood. For services to schoolchildren's athletics in the North of England.
- Herbert William Wood, Chairman, Wood Bros. (Furniture Export) Ltd. For services to Export.
- John Derrik Wood, Principal Youth Officer, Kirklees Local Education Authority.
- Kenneth Wood. For Political and Public Service.
- Donald Woodcock, Director, Bradford Chamber of Commerce.
- Anthony Woods, Southern Counties' Regional Secretary, Union of Construction, Allied Trades and Technicians.
- Brian Woollatt, Senior Charge Nurse, Bethlem Royal Hospital London.
- Ann Patricia Worthington, Founder and Editor, In Touch.
- Rose Annie Yeomans. For services to the community in Hampshire.

Diplomatic Service and Overseas List

- Peter Collins Barr, Commercial Officer, HM Embassy, Tel Aviv.
- Christopher John Beattie, lately Chief Surveyor and Registrar of Lands, Montserrat.
- William Edward Bruce, First Secretary (Administration), HM Embassy, Madrid.
- Joseph Anthony Cassar, lately Translator, European Commission, Brussels.
- Cheng Yang-ping, Chief Interpreter, Government of Hong Kong.
- Cheung Man-sang, Assistant Director of Urban Services, Hong Kong.
- William David Cockshott. For services to the British community in Lisbon.
- Ernest Sidney Coe. For services to the education of the blind in Eastern India.
- Frederick Lawrence Copperman. Honorary British Consul, Bangui, Central African Republic.
- Robert William Day, lately Communications Officer, Government House, Hong Kong.
- Rimma, Lady Durlacher. For services to the British community in Cannes.
- Marjorie Claire Edwards. For services to the British community in Kansas.
- Pamela Felton. For nursing services to the community in Oman.
- Ralph Leonard Ferguson, CPM, Commandant, Reserve Constabulary, Bermuda.
- Joseph Ferreira. For services to the community in Bermuda.
- Ian Richard Garner, lately Attaché, HM Embassy, Luanda.
- John Elijah George, District Registrar and Sub-Postmaster, British Virgin Islands.
- Joseph Allan Hall, Visa Officer, HM Embassy, Brussels.
- Joan Hannah Hanwell, lately International Staff, NATO, Brussels.
- Margaret Mary Kidd. For educational services to the community in Jordan.
- Peggy Lam Pei Yu-dja. For services to the community in Hong Kong.
- James Malcolm Lawrie, Attaché, HM Embassy, Peking.
- Mona Leong Wong Man-suen. For services to the community in Hong Kong.
- Edwin Leung Chung-ching. For services to the community in Hong Kong.
- Geoffrey Charles Lytton, General Secretary. Hong Kong Polytechnic.
- Pamela Anita Moya Mccarthy. For services to the British community in Mexico City.
- Perry Shiro Mihara, lately Honorary British Consul, Kitakyushu, Japan.
- Victor Miller, lately Attaché, HM Embassy, Tripoli.
- Mary Elizabeth Morillo, Occupational Therapist, Department of Education, Gibraltar.
- William Duncan Moss, lately Second Secretary, British High Commission, Singapore.
- Bertha Mary Mueller. For services to the British Community in Wiesbaden.
- Clare Philomena Murray, Personal Assistant, HM Embassy, Washington.
- John Arthur Parry, Vice-Consul, HM Embassy, Athens.
- Patricia June Helen Archdale Potier-Godinho. For services to the British community in Lisbon.
- Michael Clarkson Rae. For services to the British community in Naples.
- Charles Rodriguez. For services to commerce in Gibraltar.
- Adam Simpson Ross. For services to education in São Paulo.
- Winifred Jane Sinclair Sack, Pro-Consul, HM Embassy, Washington.
- John Keith Napier Scott. For services to the British community in Chile.
- John Maurice Shonfield, Accountant, British High Commission, Ottawa.
- Eric Smith, Second Secretary, UK Mission to the United Nations, New York.
- Trevor Spencer. For services to the British community in Istanbul.
- Robert Edward Sutton. For services to the British Community in Madras.
- Albert Taylor. For services to the British community in Limburg, Belgium.
- David George Tunstall, Second Secretary and Consul, HM Embassy, Jeddah.
- William Norman Tustain. For services to British commercial interests in Canada.
- Hilda Wadsworth. For nursing and welfare services to the community in Zambia.
- Richard Neville Ward, lately Technical Education Officer, British Council, Egypt.
- Joan Wells. For services to the British community in Southern California.
- Rex Vivian Wigg, Honorary British Vice-Consul, Rio Grande, Brazil.
- Charles Stuart Wilkinson, Director of Broadcasting, Hong Kong.
- Maurice Frank Williams. For services to the education of the deaf in Kenya.
- Patricia Evason Wilson, lately Personal Assistant to HM Ambassador, Stockholm.

Australian States

State of Queensland

- Margaret Fitzherbert. For services to the Queensland Country Women's Association.
- George Alfred Greenup. For services to the Jandowae community and the Australian beef cattle industry.
- Athol Charles Jory, DFC. For services as pilot to the Queensland Government.
- Lyle Villers Morton. For services to the Birdsville community.
- Colin Aubrey Noller. For services to the Kumbia and District community.
- Patricia Alice Roberts. For services to early childhood development and education.
- Arthur Thomas Scurr. For services to the community.
- Ernest Albert Toovey. For services to ex-servicemen and to sport.
- William Gordon Woolcock. For services to the community.

State of Tasmania

- Ian Ross Chalk. For services to the community.
- William Albert Edward McHugo. For services to the Returned Services League.

=== Order of the Companions of Honour (CH) ===
- Sir Hugh Maxwell Casson, KCVO. For services to Architecture and the Arts.

=== Companion of the Imperial Service Order (ISO) ===
Home Civil Service

- Leonard George Adams, Principal, Cabinet Office.
- Raymond John Alwood, Senior Principal, HM Treasury.
- Robert Anderson, Inspector (P), Board of Inland Revenue.
- Leslie Artingstall, lately Principal Professional and Technology Officer, Ministry of Defence.
- John Harold Stanley Baker, Principal, Ministry of Agriculture, Fisheries and Food.
- Thomas Philip Ball, Inspector (P), Board of Inland Revenue.
- Arthur Bowden, Principal, Department of Health and Social Security.
- William John Rhind Bower, Foreign and Commonwealth Office.
- Andrew Galbraith Briggs, Foreign and Commonwealth Office.
- James Canning, Principal Officer, Department of Health and Social Services, Northern Ireland.
- John Dennis Cantwell, lately Assistant Keeper Grade I, Lord Chancellor's Department.
- William Alfred Davy, Deputy Collector, Board of Customs and Excise.
- Clifford Diamond, Principal, Department of Health and Social Security.
- William Howard, Deputy Principal Clerk, Supreme Courts in Scotland.
- Gordon James Laing, Principal Scientific Officer, Ministry of Defence.
- Donald Frank Lingley, lately Principal Professional and Technology Officer, Ministry of Defence.
- John Duncan Lodder, Senior Principal, Home Office.
- Helen Simpson Milne, Inspector (P), Board of Inland Revenue.
- Harry Geoffrey Thomas Pio Rissone, lately Senior Principal Scientific Officer, Ministry of Defence.
- Dudley Russom, lately Assistant Chief Civil Hydrographic Officer, Ministry of Defence.
- George Arthur Salt, Senior Principal, Department of Trade and Industry.
- Henry Bryan Spear, Chief Inspector, Home Office.
- Bryan Hugh Waterhouse, lately Senior Principal, Department of Employment.

Diplomatic Service and Overseas List

- Lydia Cheung Chi-ming, Director of Nursing, Medical and Health Department, Hong Kong.
- Roy Kilvert, ED, Director of Government Supplies, Hong Kong.
- Graham John Osborne, Director of Electrical and Mechanical Services, Public Works Department, Hong Kong.
- Maurice Derek Sargant, Secretary-General, Umelco Office, Hong Kong.

Australian States

State of Tasmania

- Frank Desmond Potts. Chief Inspecting Pharmacist, State Department of Health.

=== British Empire Medal (BEM) ===
Military Division

Royal Navy

- Petty Officer Air Engineering Mechanic (R.) James William Andrews, D065109C.
- Chief Petty Officer (Operations) (Missile) Cyril Blain, D176409U.
- Chief Petty Officer Air Engineering Artificer (L.) Gerald Charles Everitt, D050079M.
- Master-at-Arms Richard Edward Ford, D058298Y.
- Chief Radio Supervisor Raymond Goldsmith, Royal Naval Reserve, X/D986168W.
- Chief Petty Officer Weapon Engineering Artificer Peter Richard Harris, D092165U.
- Chief Petty Officer Stores Accountant George Ernest Hill, D154588F.
- Charge Chief Marine Engineering Artificer (H.) Robert Wallace Kane, D063306B.
- Chief Petty Officer Stores Accountant William Glen Livingston, D076573Q.
- Charge Chief Weapon Engineering Artificer Derek John McIntosh, D159750H.
- Chief Petty Officer Aircrewman Robert Douglas Niblock, F967045T.
- Chief Petty Officer Stores Accountant David Adrian Part, D093613M.
- Colour Sergeant Gordon Harold Russell, Royal Marines, P024617B.
- Colour Sergeant John Michael Sheridan, Royal Marines, P020199C.
- Master-at-Arms Malcolm Roy Smith, M983019E.
- Chief Petty Officer Steward Maurice Arthur Stevenson, D088283M.
- Chief Petty Officer (Mine Warfare) Thomas Ross Strain, Royal Naval Reserve, J/D980754H.
- Colour Sergeant (C.S.) Neville Talbot, Royal Marines, P011609M.
- Chief Petty Officer Plotter Dudley Francis Tucker, Royal Naval Reserve, D989405H.

Army

- 23849545 Sergeant Henry Bertie Anacoura, Royal Corps of Signals.
- 23726176 Staff Sergeant Brian Patrick Andrews, 14th/20th King's Hussars.
- 24014631 Corporal Keith Ashcroft, Royal Corps of Transport.
- 22423662 Sergeant Roger Charles Barker, Royal Corps of Signals, Territorial Army.
- 24447724 Sergeant Steve Bennett, Royal Army Ordnance Corps.
- 21158108 Staff Sergeant (Acting Warrant Officer Class 2) Birbahadur Mukhia Sunwar, 2nd King Edward VII's Own Gurkha Rifles (The Sirmoor Rifles).
- 23491513 Corporal John Edward Bond, The Royal Green Jackets, Territorial Army.
- 24140953 Staff Sergeant Michael Clement Bottomley, Corps of Royal Military Police.
- 21183330 Sergeant John George Braven, Royal Corps of Signals, Territorial Army (now discharged).
- LS/22779389 Staff Sergeant Frederick Brown, Irish Guards.
- 23938535 Staff Sergeant (now Warrant Officer Class 2) Peter Brown, Coldstream Guards.
- LS/22845000 Staff Sergeant William John Brown, The Royal Anglian Regiment.
- 24285250 Sergeant Stephen Michael Bruen, Corps of Royal Engineers.
- 24119790 Staff Sergeant Michael David Burrows, Royal Army Ordnance Corps.
- W/466413 Corporal Lorraine Deborah Butcher, Women's Royal Army Corps.
- 24391902 Bombardier Stephen James Eccles, Royal Regiment of Artillery.
- 24100840 Staff Sergeant David Freeman, 1st The Queen's Dragoon Guards.
- 22961361 Sergeant Charles Arthur Fry, Royal Army Medical Corps, Territorial Army.
- 21159308 Corporal Ganeshbahadur Limbu, 10th Princess Mary's Own Gurkha Rifles.
- 23518609 Staff Sergeant Arthur John Gay, Royal Regiment of Artillery, Territorial Army.
- 23959925 Corporal William Malcolm Gibb, Royal Corps of Transport.
- 24173071 Sergeant Michael Hugh Goult, Royal Army Ordnance Corps.
- 23683379 Staff Sergeant William Dennis Hare, Corps of Royal Military Police.
- 24317249 Corporal Steven John Hargreaves, Royal Tank Regiment (now discharged).
- 24236330 Corporal Kevin Greiveson Harker, The Queen's Own Hussars.
- 23259207 Lance Corporal Denis Harkin, Army Catering Corps', Territorial Army.
- 24124504 Corporal Alan Harrod, Royal Corps of Transport.
- 24174762 Sergeant Stephen Hawley, 13th/18th Royal Hussars (Queen Mary's Own).
- 24168210 Staff Sergeant Douglas Stormont Henney, Corps of Royal Engineers.
- 24179219 Sergeant (Acting Staff Sergeant) Tony Higgs, Corps of Royal Engineers.
- 24200961 Corporal Mark Anthony Hunt, The King's Regiment.
- 23751998 Sergeant Arthur Kennedy, The Royal Irish Rangers (27th (Inniskilling), 83rd and 87th), Territorial Army.
- 21159018 Staff Sergeant (Acting Warrant Officer Class 2) Krishnakumar Ale, 2nd King Edward VII's Own Gurkha Rifles (The Sirmoor Rifles).
- 23784724 Staff Sergeant Eric Martin Lumley, Corps of Royal Electrical and Mechanical Engineers (now discharged).
- 24348952 Sergeant Vincent Edward Mahan, Royal Corps of Transport.
- 24204477 Staff Sergeant Thomas Lacey McCallion, Royal Army Ordnance Corps.
- 24060453 Staff Sergeant Vincent Martin McCann, The Royal Irish Rangers (27th (Inniskilling), 83rd and 87th).
- 23976967 Staff Sergeant Jeffrey Roger Meachin, Army Catering Corps.
- 24063995 Sergeant James Jamieson Morrison, Corps of Royal Electrical and Mechanical Engineers.
- 24343370 Sergeant (Acting Staff Sergeant) Paul James Naisbett, Royal Army Ordnance Corps.
- 23676130 Staff Sergeant Anthony John Newman, The Parachute Regiment (now discharged).
- 23880087 Bombardier David John Oakes, Royal Regiment of Artillery.
- 23932860 Staff Sergeant Ronald Oliver, Army Catering Corps (now discharged).
- 24277082 Staff Sergeant Alan Percy, Royal Army Pay Corps.
- W/416992 Private (Acting Staff Sergeant) Sandra Perry, Women's Royal Army Corps.
- 22229148 Sergeant James Frederick George Priestley, Corps of Royal Electrical and Mechanical Engineers, Territorial Army.
- 24177780 Staff Sergeant Neil Scott Quin, Royal Army Ordnance Corps.
- 23937859 Staff Sergeant Paul Andre Rayner, Corps of Royal Military Police (now discharged).
- 24012452 Staff Sergeant (Acting Warrant Officer Class 2) Terence Renwick, 13th/18th Royal Hussars (Queen Mary's Own).
- 23847848 Staff Sergeant John Peter Roberts, Corps of Royal Electrical and Mechanical Engineers.
- 24354683 Lance Corporal (Acting Corporal) Derek Robertson, Royal Corps of Signals.
- 22709809 Staff Sergeant Dennis Maxwell Saunders, The King's Own Royal Border Regiment, Territorial Army.
- 24179971 Sergeant Joseph Olukunle Sawyerr, Corps of Royal Engineers.
- 24170973 Staff Sergeant John Selkirk, Corps of Royal Electrical and Mechanical Engineers.
- 24252579 Staff Sergeant (now Acting Warrant Officer Class 2) John Arthur Simpson, 9th/12th Royal Lancers (Prince of Wales's).
- 23967288 Staff Sergeant Andrew Victor Smith, Corps of Royal Electrical and Mechanical Engineers.
- 23987400 Corporal Benjamin Albert Smith, Royal Army Ordnance Corps.
- 24120969 Sergeant Neil Scrimgeour Carneg Smith, Corps of Royal Engineers.
- 23921094 Staff Sergeant Ronald Frank Sumner, Corps of Royal Electrical and Mechanical Engineers.
- 24087240 Staff Sergeant Edwin Morley Sutherland, Royal Corps of Signals.
- W/462720 Sergeant Elizabeth Jane Terry, Women's Royal Army Corps.
- 23982108 Staff Sergeant (now Warrant Officer Class 2) Peter Alan Thorpe, Corps of Royal Engineers.
- W/435258 Private (Acting Sergeant) Joyce Philomena Mary Tuomey, Women's Royal Army Corps.
- 24123810 Sergeant (now Acting Staff Sergeant) Kenneth George Wike, Royal Regiment of Artillery.
- 24000334 Sergeant David Elvin Wilkinson, Grenadier Guards.
- 24133720 Staff Sergeant James Edward Wood, Army Physical Training Corps.

Royal Air Force

- W0685719 Flight Sergeant Masson Saint Adams.
- G4201496 Flight Sergeant John Patrick Hogan.
- D4273644 Flight Sergeant Royston Frederick John Lobley.
- M1940623 Flight Sergeant Anthony Philip Reeve.
- E1935514 Flight Sergeant Patrick Henry Rooney.
- L4273300 Flight Sergeant Henry Thomas Smyth.
- F2845294 Flight Sergeant Susan Anne Walker, Women's Royal Air Force.
- Y2684245 Flight Sergeant William Frank Webster, Royal Auxiliary Air Force.
- A8069035 Chief Technician Stephen Gordon George Bartlett.
- E1960415 Chief Technician Christopher Paul Bell.
- D1941112 Chief Technician (now Flight Sergeant) Alan Gair.
- Y4265493 Chief Technician John Lewis Ramsay.
- El921648 Chief Technician Alfred David Woolf.
- F8085851 Sergeant Hugh Anthony Campbell.
- V0595100 Sergeant (now Flight Sergeant) Michael James Hope.
- M1947116 Sergeant Victor Denis Manton.
- E8089774 Sergeant John Moore.
- K8105688 Sergeant Geoffrey Louis Norman.
- P8010690 Sergeant Allen John Philpott.
- P8091279 Sergeant Goon Cheng Soo.
- Y0594528 Sergeant (now Flight Sergeant) John Raymond Broadfoot Wright.

Overseas Award

- X0594230 Flight Sergeant Terence John Upfield, Royal Air Force. For services with the British Embassy, Stockholm.

Civil Division

United Kingdom

- Timothy Wightman Ainslie. For services to the community in Duns, Berwickshire.
- Harold Norman Bagby, Senior Telephonist, Borough of Redditch.
- James Bannister, Maintenance Operator, Fawley Refinery, Esso Petroleum Co. Ltd.
- Walter Barcz, lately Locally Entered Civilian Foreman B, Ministry of Defence.
- Albert Barlow, Faceworker, Caphouse/Denby Grange Colliery, Barnsley Area, National Coal Board.
- Ronald Barnes, Constable, Merseyside Police.
- Sidney Barnes, Conservation Officer, Greater Manchester Museum of Science and Industry.
- William Barrett. For services to the community in Rotherfield Greys, Henley-on-Thames.
- George Eric Bass, Warrant Officer, No. 195, Grimsby Squadron, Air Training Corps.
- Nesta Olive Batchelor, School Crossing Patrol, Metropolitan Police.
- Joy Ellen Baum, Leader, Wakefield Gateway Club for the Mentally Handicapped.
- Margaret Bellamy, Subpostmistress, Leicester Head Office Area, The Post Office.
- Joe Belton, Senior Fire Control Operator, Suffolk Fire Service.
- Edward Albert Bennett, lately Senior Mechanical Fitter, Canterbury Division, Mid-Kent Water Company.
- Ernest Leonard Bennett. For services to the Mentally Handicapped in Glossop.
- Nellie Bettison. For services to the Cooperative Education movement in the Mansfield and Worksop area.
- Michael Henry Thomas Billett, Professional and Technology Officer III, Department of the Environment.
- Thomas George Birdseye, lately Electrician, National Institute for Medical Research.
- Norah Constance Bishop. For services to Westminster Hospital.
- Christopher Charles Blick, Traffic Assistant, Stroud, Cheltenham & Gloucester Omnibus Co. Ltd.
- Raymond Frank Bloxham, Detective Sergeant, Metropolitan Police.
- Margaret Bond, Professional and Technology Officer Grade IV, Department of Health and Social Security.
- John Brannan, Foreman, Thomas Tunnock Ltd., Uddingston, Lanarkshire.
- Joseph Clay Brook, General Foreman, A. N. Cooke & Co. Ltd.
- Charles Dennis Brown, Supervising Instructional Officer Grade I, Ministry of Defence.
- Peter John Brown, Sub-Officer, Yelverton Station, Devon Fire Brigade.
- Ronald Buck, Underground Development Worker, Maltby Colliery, South Yorkshire Area, National Coal Board.
- Victor Harold Burchell, lately Professional and Technology Officer III, Ministry of Defence.
- Robert William Burrell, Welfare Visitor, Royal Naval Association.
- John Albert Percival Busttn, lately Technical Officer, British Telecommunications plc.
- Bernard Joseph Callaghan, lately Craft Assistant, 'Visqueen' Polythene Film Products, Imperial Chemical Industries plc.
- Marion Campbell, Handloom Weaver, Isle of Harris, Western Isles.
- Violet Annie Campbell, Chef Grade 2, Northern Ireland Office.
- Stanley Leonard Cator, Crane Driver, Forestry Commission.
- Margaret Ann Chalcraft. For services to the community in Riseley, Berkshire.
- Kar Ping Chan, Tailor/Laundryman, Ministry of Defence.
- Harris Chaplin, lately Manager, Hohne, West Germany, Services Sound & Vision Corporation Cinema.
- Herbert Daniel Chillingworth, Meteorological Observer, Auxiliary Station, Bradwell-on-Sea, Essex.
- Margaret Elizabeth Clegg, Works Production Manager, RFD Ltd, Aero Engineers, Dunmurry, Belfast.
- Robert Coates, Transport Officer (Maintenance), Eastern Health and Social Services Board.
- Donald Cole, Retained Sub Officer, Hampshire Fire Brigade.
- Frederick John Coles, lately Sergeant Commissionaire, Head Office, British Aerospace plc.
- Frank Gordon Cookson, Senior Foreman, Electrical Assembly Department, Leicester, Marconi Radar Systems Ltd.
- Ronald Copeland, Movements Inspector, London Midland Region, British Railways.
- Francis John Courtney, Sergeant, Metropolitan Police.
- Kathleen Mary Cowdrey. For services to Bromley Hospital, Bromley Health Authority.
- William Rice Cowen, Shipwright, Swan Hunter Shipbuilders Ltd.
- Derek Wenford Charles Cox, Plant Planning Engineer, Marconi Radar Systems Ltd.
- James William Cranswick, Driver, Eastern Region, British Railways.
- Harry Cuffling, Civilian Instructor, Doncaster Unit, Sea Cadet Corps.
- John Frederick Cull. For services to Agriculture in the Isle of Wight.
- Frank Cutts, Chief Officer II, Werrington House Detention Centre.
- Michael Davies, Sergeant, Humberside Police.
- Reginald John Day, Assistant Area Staff Officer (Ceremonial), Warwickshire, Sea Cadet Corps.
- Margaret Ann Dick, Hospital Car Service Organiser, Perth, Women's Royal Voluntary Service.
- Thomas Harold Melmoth Dodds, Detective Constable, Ministry of Defence Police.
- Sarah Doherty, lately Cloakroom Attendant, Notre Dame High School, Glasgow.
- Ethel Mary Duck, Foster Parent, Tywardreath, Cornwall Social Services Department.
- John Croasdale Duerden, Auxiliary Coastguard in Charge, Arnside.
- William James Ernest Dukelow, Observer, No. 31 Group, Royal Observer Corps.
- Ian Malcolm Duncan, Head Library Attendant, House of Commons.
- James Francis Edwards, lately Chief Officer I, HM Prison Brixton.
- Kenneth John Evans, Nursery Foreman, Royal Parks Division, Department of the Environment.
- Reginald John Finch, Garage Hand, Metropolitan Police.
- Barbara Tresilian Flinn, District Organiser, Yeovil, Women's Royal Voluntary Service.
- Henry Forster, Principal Officer, Northern Ireland Prison Service.
- Edward George Fory, Service Engineer, North Eastern Region, British Gas Corporation.
- Eric Francis Foulger, Head Nurseryman, Recreation and Open Spaces Department, Liverpool City Council.
- Harry Crosthwaite Garritty, Operations Superintendent, Northern Division, North West Water Authority.
- Robert Getty, Constable, Royal Ulster Constabulary.
- Beatrice Maud Gibbons, Chief Steward I, Ministry of Defence.
- Eric Glasby, Foreman, Dalescraft Furniture Ltd.
- Peter George Glasspool, Cartographic Draughtsman, Senior Grade, Ordnance Survey.
- Colin John Goodman, Store Keeper, Brixton, Remploy Ltd.
- Peter Henry Guy Gould, Engineering Foreman, Southern Electricity Board.
- James Graham, Progressman Planner, Ministry of Defence.
- Robert Graham, Higher Class Operative, Department of the Environment, Northern Ireland.
- Doris Grass, lately Head Cook, Jane Walker Hospital, East Suffolk Health Authority.
- Leslie Green, Switchboard Operator, Rose Forgrove Ltd.
- James Greer, Quality Assistant, Prestwick Civil Division, Aircraft Group, British Aerospace plc.
- George Munro Dow Hamilton, Senior Messenger, Scottish Office.
- William Hamilton, Foreign and Commonwealth Office.
- Joseph Peter Harling, lately Chargehand, Springfields Works, British Nuclear Fuels plc.
- Frederick George Edwin Harris. For services to the Warwickshire Association of Boys' Clubs.
- Margaret Susan Harrison. For services to the community in North Hykeham, Lincoln.
- Samual Fredrick Richard Hayes. For services to Dereham Hospital, Norwich Health Authority.
- Dennis Aubrey Hayles, Charge Hand Boatbuilder, Whisstock's Boatyard Ltd.
- George Henry Haysum, lately Postman, Sleaford SSO, Grantham Head Office Area, Midlands Postal Board, The Post Office.
- Jill Ida Lilian Hewett. For services to the Women's Royal Voluntary Service in Barnet and Finchley.
- Mary Priddle-Higson. For services to the community in Llanrwst, Gwynedd.
- Elizabeth Hill. For services to Wrightington Hospital, West Lancashire.
- Henry Hill, lately Fitter, Risley Nuclear Laboratories, United Kingdom Atomic Energy Authority.
- Ronald Hill. For services to the Beverley Unit, Church Lads Brigade.
- Elsie Mary Hoggins, Telephonist, Warwickshire County Council.
- Sydney Charles Hook, Senior Pilot, Teignmouth Pilotage District, Trinity House.
- Frank Carl Howard, Safety Officer, Bentinck Colliery, South Notts Area, National Coal Board.
- Lucy Ibbotson, Member, Kingswood, Women's Royal Voluntary Service.
- Daphne Marjorie Lily Jones, lately Personal Secretary to the Secretary General of the Federation of Fresh Meat Wholesalers.
- Peter James Jones, Distribution Fitter, North Western Region, British Gas Corporation.
- Thomas Arthur Jones, Divisional Officer-in-Chief, Ruthin Division, Clwyd, St. John Ambulance Brigade.
- Francizek Kalinowski, Chargeman, Scottish Region, British Railways.
- Kenneth Malcolm Kettle, Senior Foreman, Chance Pilkington.
- Victor Kinnin, Driver, Midland Red (South) Ltd.
- William John Lamont, lately Special Constable, Lothian and Borders Police.
- Kenneth Lawson, Supply Superintendent, Cambridge Water Company.
- Kenneth Leake, First Hand Melter, Tinsley Park Works, British Steel Corporation Special Steels.
- Thomas Bennett Leake, Mechanic Examiner, Ministry of Defence.
- Olwen Gwenllian Lewis. For services to the community in Llandovery.
- Clifton Edgar Ling, Police Constable, Norfolk Constabulary.
- Dorothy Edith Lister, lately Home Help, Norfolk.
- Doreen Lloyd. For services to the community in Cwmbran.
- Michael John Logan, Hall Porter, English-Speaking Union.
- James Tough Lonie, Chief Mast and Aerial Fitter, Independent Broadcasting Authority.
- Freda Mary Lord. For services to the community in West Yorkshire.
- Peter Paul Lynam, Assembly Superintendent, Feltham, Defence Systems Division, Thorn EMI Electronics.
- Alexander McClean, Works Engineer, William Clark & Sons, Upperlands, Maghera, Co. Londonderry.
- Samual McClean, Foreman (Mechanical), Department of the Environment, Northern Ireland.
- John Michael George McDonald, Constable, West Yorkshire Metropolitan Police.
- Patrick McGillicuddy, Convener, Transport and General Workers' Union, W. Canning Materials Ltd.
- Ellen Jane McGlynn, Foster Parent, Strathclyde and Highland Regional Councils.
- James Alexander McIlveen, Constable, Royal Ulster Constabulary.
- Barbara Angela McKeand, Metropolitan Organiser, Liverpool, Women's Royal Voluntary Service.
- John Francis McKenzie, lately Station Warden, Ministry of Defence.
- Peter John McKim, Hot Metal Loco Driver, Llanwern Works, British Steel Corporation Strip Mill Products.
- Thomas Alexander McMullen, Work Study Assistant, North Eastern Region, Central Electricity Generating Board.
- James Joseph McShane, Senior Plaster Room Orderly, Craigavon Area Hospital.
- Hugh Magorrian, Retained Sub Officer, Fire Authority for Northern Ireland.
- Leonard Mann, Foreman, Finishing Department, Robert Laidlaw & Sons Ltd.
- Edward Lawrence Marrett, Service Engineer, John Brown Plastics Machinery (UK) Ltd.
- Blanche Massey. For services to the community in South Yorkshire.
- Ernest Arthur Maynard, Distribution Foreman, South Eastern Electricity Board.
- Owen Meehan, Highway Supervisor, Department of the Environment, Northern Ireland.
- Graham Mellor, Sub Officer, Staffordshire Fire Brigade.
- Francis Edgar William Messenger, Sales Lorry Driver, Rugby Portland Cement plc.
- Frank Miller, Driver, English Regional Television, British Broadcasting Corporation.
- William John Charles Miller, Bus Conductor, Palmers Green Garage, London Regional Transport.
- Ruby Jessie Milne, Secretary, Fife Branch, Multiple Sclerosis Society.
- Robert Cassie Minty, Stock Manager, Tarves, Aberdeenshire.
- David Morgan, Constable, West Midlands Police.
- Margaret Amy Morris. For services to the Scout Association in Leicester.
- Kenneth Lewis Musto, Secretary, Eastern Counties Wine and Spirits Association.
- Derrick Rupert Neal, Chauffeur to The Lord Bishop of Peterborough.
- Peter Eric Newby, Divisional Officer, Metropolitan Special Constabulary.
- Michael Alfred Newman, Licensed Aircraft Engineer, Heavylift Cargo Ltd.
- Alfred Nicol. For services to Boys' Football in Huntly, Aberdeenshire.
- Horace Edward Nutten, Carpenter, Ben Line Steamers Ltd.
- Roy David Sidney Oliver, Professional and Technology Officer III, Ministry of Defence.
- Osman Abdul Moneim Osman, Manager, Sub-Bar, Horseguards, Navy, Army and Air Force Institutes.
- Norman Andrew Parfitt, Constable, Metropolitan Police.
- George Parkinson, Senior Overman, Haig Colliery, Western Area, National Coal Board.
- Charles William Parsons, Professional and Technology Officer III, Ministry of Defence.
- Bhupendra Chaturbhai Patel, Subpostmaster, London S.W.8, The Post Office.
- Dennis Charles Maclachlan Pearce, Breakdown and Information Service Shift Co-ordinator, Automobile Association.
- James Rodney Pearce, Youth Leader, Kenwanne Centre, Saltash.
- Leslie Edward Pearce, Craftsman Jointer, Midlands Electricity Board.
- Bruce Michael Peardon, Sergeant, Metropolitan Police.
- James Pearson, Shepherd, Kirriemuir, Angus.
- Janet Winifred Pearson. For services to the British Red Cross Society in Surrey.
- Robert Henry Pendrell, Storekeeper, Ministry of Agriculture, Fisheries and Food.
- Bernard George Perry, Tool Room Foreman, Martin Baker Aircraft Co. Ltd.
- George Pickering, Shop Steward, Smiths Ship Repairers North Shields Ltd.
- Ernest Pickford. For services to the community in Stoke-on-Trent.
- Terence William Piddock, Constable, Kent Constabulary.
- Stanley Algernon Pitts, Instructional Officer Grade III, Ministry of Defence.
- Harold Pryke, Instructional Officer Grade III, Department of Employment.
- Joseph Psaila, lately Foundry Moulder, Ministry of Defence.
- Kathleen Mary Redman, Foster Parent, Kent County Council.
- Robert Reid, Sergeant, Royal Ulster Constabulary.
- David Joseph Roberts, Activity Foreman, Grade 3, London Electricity Board.
- Fred Roberts, Chief Officer, Bradford Voluntary Emergency Service.
- Roland Fredrick Roberts, Sign Gang Foreman/Driver, Oxfordshire County Council.
- Charles James Robinson, Coastguard Officer, Falmouth, Department of Transport.
- Leonard Sidney James Robinson, Machine Shop Technician, Plessey Displays Ltd.
- Roy Rowlands, lately Regimental Sergeant Major Instructor, Dorset Army Cadet Force.
- Nigel Anthony Saint, Motor Mechanic, Aldeburgh Lifeboat, Royal National Lifeboat Institution.
- Elsie May Saunders. For services to the community in Cwmbran.
- Margaret Schofield, Youth Leader and Treasurer, Stratford-on-Avon Centre, British Red Cross Society.
- Harry Shaw, Branch Training Officer Redcar, and Centre Organiser Cleveland, British Red Cross Society.
- Kenneth John Shaw, Professional and Technology Officer IV, Laboratory of the Government Chemist.
- Philip Harold Shaw, lately General Foreman, Norwich City Council.
- Ivy Ellen Skelton. For services to Alderwood Primary School.
- Donald James Smith, Clerk, Sales Order Processing Department, GKN Sankey Ltd.
- Edward Smith, Chief Petty Officer, Department of Agriculture and Fisheries for Scotland.
- Frederick Brian Smith, Depot Manager, Pandoro.
- Hugh Findlay Brownlie Smith, Constable, Strathclyde Police.
- John Nixon Smith, Mason, Department of the Environment.
- Patrick John Snell, Officer, HM Prison Reading.
- David Kneath Spencer. For services to the community in Avon.
- Herbert Ernest Spicer, Manager, Central Messing Store, Aldershot, Navy, Army and Air Force Institutes.
- Ruby Yvonne Stephens, Secretary, Barking Division, Soldiers', Sailors' and Airmen's Families Association.
- John Stevens, Head Porter, University of Surrey.
- Thomas Stodter, Cook/Steward, P&O Ferries.
- Mary Kennedy Stone. For services to the Women's Royal Voluntary Service in Essex.
- Albert Colbert Storey, Civilian Workman, Gaynes Hall Youth Custody Centre.
- Irene Strong, Metropolitan Organiser, Rotherham, Women's Royal Voluntary Service.
- Dorothy Marion Sully. For services to the Post Office Advisory Committee in Somerset.
- Kenneth Creasey Sumner, lately Locally Entered Civilian Foreman, Ministry of Defence.
- Mervyn Thomas Alfred Syvret, Assistant Commissioner, Mid Glamorgan, St. John Ambulance Brigade.
- Ronald Teasdale, lately Head Gardener, Nuffield Lodge, Regent's Park.
- Antony Garnett Thompson, Maintenance Foreman, Henry Cooke Ltd.
- Victor Thompson, Trades Officer Class I, Northern Ireland Prison Service.
- Frederick Anthony Titchener, Detective Constable, Metropolitan Police.
- George Downie Smith Townsley, Works Manager, John Allan & Sons Ltd, Clydebank.
- Alfred John Charles Turner, Regimental Sergeant Major Instructor, Bedfordshire, Army Cadet Force.
- Inez Mabel Ugalde. For services to the British Red Cross Society in Cornwall.
- Auguste Louis Henri Voegeli, Fire Service Officer III, Radiological and Safety Division, Winfrith, United Kingdom Atomic Energy Authority.
- Clifford Waddon, Craftsman, Warren Spring Laboratory.
- Eric John Ward, Constable, Staffordshire Police.
- Joan Warren, Civilian Communications Operator, Lancashire Constabulary.
- Gordon Grosvenor Watkins, Service Engineer, South Western Region, British Gas Corporation.
- Helen Elizabeth Lewis Watkins, Subpostmistress, Badminton, The Post Office.
- Jack Wells, Guard, Western Region, British Railways.
- Cicely Winefred Wensley, Local Organiser, Evesham, Women's Royal Voluntary Service.
- Peter Weston, Service Engineer, North Western Region, British Gas Corporation.
- James White, Administrative Officer (APS) Housing Management Control Unit, Northern Ireland Housing Executive.
- Lois Kate White. For services to the community in Slinford, West Sussex.
- Edward Wickham, Foreman Bricklayer, International Garden Festival, Liverpool.
- Isabella Joan Wight. For services to the community in Laurencekirk, Kincardineshire.
- Margaret Brynmor-Williams. For Services to the community in Llandysul, Dyfed.
- James Henry Wilson, Security Officer, Austins Ltd., Londonderry.
- Olivia Wilson, London Borough Organiser, Lewisham, Women's Royal Voluntary Service.
- Alfred Newton Woodward, lately Turner/Chargehand, Ministry of Defence.
- Frances Ellen Woolley, Secretary, Radio Amateur Invalid and Blind Club.
- Peter Wright, lately Foreign and Commonwealth Office.

Overseas Territories

- Evelyn Mary Bagley, Head Teacher, Blue Hill Primary School, St Helena.
- Chan Hon-sang, Senior Personal Secretary, Police Department, Hong Kong.
- Chu Shiu-lun, Chief Training Supervisor, Auxiliary Medical Services, Hong Kong.
- Joanna Faith Clarke, lately Principal, Savannah Primary School, Cayman Islands.
- Venecia Faulkner. For services to the community in Anegada, British Virgin Islands.
- Abelardo Jiminez, Head Porter, St. Bernard's Hospital, Gibraltar.
- Lam Kwan-wai, Principal Survey Officer, Lands and Works Department, Hong Kong.
- Liu, Wah-ngah, Clerk of Works Class 1, Building Development Department, Hong Kong.
- Ng Yee-kwan, Inspector of Apprentices, Printing Department, Hong Kong.
- Clementine Smith. For services to the community in Salt Island, British Virgin Islands.
- Tang Hon-lit, Assistant Officer Class 1, Prisons Department, Hong Kong.
- Wu Pak-ming, Clerical Officer Class 1, Labour Department, Hong Kong.

Australian States

State of Queensland

- Kimbal Allen. For services to education in North Queensland.
- Joan Nancy Lister Andrew. For services to the Mackay community.
- Hugh Augustine Courtney. For services to rugby union in Queensland.
- Albert John Cross. For services to the Queensland Police Force.
- Henry Herbert Ellis. For services to the Royal Bush Children's Health Scheme.
- Julia Catherine Hung. For services to the community.
- Sister Gertrude Mary Lyons (Josephine). For services to the sick.
- Majorie Ann Manktelow. For services to the youth of the Pittsworth community.
- Amy Gladys Midwinter. For services to the community.
- Thelma Isobel Pettiford. For services to the Roma community.
- Richard Thomas Shailer. For services to the Sarina community.
- Elsie Laura Whitney. For services to the Charleville district.

State of Tasmania

- Julie Caroline Dowling. For services to the physically handicapped.
- Kevin Henry Langdon. Constable (First Class), Tasmanian Police Force.
- Alan Keith Scott. For services to the Devenport Eisteddfod Society.

=== Royal Red Cross (RRC) ===
- Lieutenant Colonel Margaret Anne Agate, (474583), Queen Alexandra's Royal Army Nursing Corps.
- Major Majorie Coulthard (499411), Queen Alexandra's Royal Army Nursing Corps.
- Lieutenant Colonel Pamela Edna Wheable (472215), Queen Alexandra's Royal Army Nursing Corps (now R.A.R.O.).
- Wing Commander Rosemary Ann Louise Partington, ARRC, (407616), Princess Mary's Royal Air Force Nursing Service.

==== Associate of the Royal Red Cross (ARRC) ====
- Superintending Nursing Officer Kathleen Ann Bowick, Queen Alexandra's Royal Naval Nursing Service.
- Superintending Nursing Officer Jillian Nina Last, Queen Alexandra's Royal Naval Nursing Service.
- Lieutenant Colonel Winifred Beryl Jackson (470286), Queen Alexandra's Royal Army Nursing Corps, Territorial Army.
- Lieutenant Colonel Doris Jean Kmgsford, TD, (488883), Queen Alexandra's Royal Army Nursing Corps, Territorial Army (now R.A.R.O.).
- Major Bridget Christina McEvilly (504266), Queen Alexandra's Royal Army Nursing Corps.
- Flight Lieutenant Terence Alwyn Smith (4286815), Princess Mary's Royal Air Force Nursing Service.

=== Air Force Cross (AFC) ===
Royal Navy

- Lieutenant Commander John Trevor Lockwood.

Army

- Captain (Acting Major) David Ian Patterson (507088), Army Air Corps.

Royal Air Force

- Squadron Leader James Allan Ball (608936).
- Squadron Leader John Blackwell (8024995).
- Squadron Leader David Richard Garden (681983).
- Squadron Leader Keith Douglas McRobb (2521698).
- Squadron Leader Alan Peter Waldron (4232860).
- Flight Lieutenant Alexander Harold James Norfolk (4232085).

=== Queen's Police Medal (QPM) ===
England and Wales

- Anthony Raymond Clement, Assistant Chief Constable, South Yorkshire Police.
- David John Cole, Detective Chief Superintendent, West Mercia Constabulary.
- Stanley William Crump, Chief Constable, Lincolnshire Police.
- Geoffrey Charles Fieldhouse, Chief Superintendent, West Midlands Police.
- Harry Glover, Chief Superintendent, Greater Manchester Police.
- Brian Hayes, Chief Constable, Surrey Constabulary.
- Alan Killip, Deputy Chief Constable, Isle of Man Constabulary.
- Roy Barry Kitson, Deputy Chief Constable, Suffolk Constabulary.
- John Brian Morgan, Deputy Chief Constable, Devon and Cornwall Constabulary.
- John Hoyland Morgan, Chief Superintendent, Cheshire Constabulary.
- Angus Craig Pattison, lately Commander, Metropolitan Police.
- Peter Phelan, Commander, Metropolitan Police.
- Graham Edward Stockwell, lately Commander, Metropolitan Police.
- Ian Mackenzie Thynne, Chief Superintendent, Metropolitan Police.
- Sheila Hazel Ward, Chief Superintendent, Northumbria Police.

Scotland

- Ruaridh Nicolson, Assistant Chief Constable, Strathclyde Police.
- David Ian McPherson, Chief Superintendent, Lothian and Borders Police.

Northern Ireland

- Robert Orr Kidd, Chief Inspector, Royal Ulster Constabulary.
- Patrick John Timoney, Inspector, Royal Ulster Constabulary.

Hong Kong

- Li Kwan-ha, CPM, Assistant Commissioner, Royal Hong Kong Police Force.

Australian States

State of Queensland

- Patrick John Swan. Superintendent of Police, Southern Police Region, Queensland Police Force.

State of Tasmania

- Garry Michael Askey-Doran, Superintendent, Tasmania Police Force.

=== Queen's Fire Services Medal (QFSM) ===
England and Wales

- Brian Godfrey Jones, Assistant Chief Officer, Merseyside Fire Brigade.
- Graham Karran, Chief Officer, West Yorkshire Fire Service.
- Raymond William Leather, Divisional Officer II, Greater Manchester Fire Service.
- William Henry Williams, Temp/Senior Divisional Officer, London Fire Brigade.

=== Colonial Police Medal (CPM) ===
- Chan Kam-Shing, Station Sergeant, Royal Hong Kong Police Force.
- Ernest Figueras, Chief Inspector, Gibraltar Police Force.
- Fong Cheung, Principal Fireman, Hong Kong Fire Services.
- Hui Chiu-yin, Superintendent, Royal Hong Kong Police Force.
- Hung Yuk-cheung, Principal Fireman, Hong Kong Fire Services.
- Raymond Brian Johnston, Senior Divisional Officer, Hong Kong Fire Services.
- Lau, Chung, Station Sergeant, Royal Hong Kong Police Force.
- Lee Kwan-tat, Superintendent, Royal Hong Kong Police Force.
- Renee Evelyn Lee, Chief Inspector, Royal Hong Kong Police Force.
- Leung Fung-shun, Superintendent, Royal Hong Kong Police Force.
- Ling Lung-shing, Station Sergeant, Royal Hong Kong Police Force.
- Lui Kwong-yeung, Principal Fireman, Hong Kong Fire Services.
- Mak Wing-chun, Station Sergeant, Royal Hong Kong Police Force.
- Alfred Henry Morris, Superintendent, Royal Hong Kong Police Force.
- Paang Kui-san, Senior Superintendent, Royal Hong Kong Police Force.
- Tang Siu-chung, Station Sergeant, Royal Hong Kong Police Force.
- Tong Hung-to, Station Sergeant, Royal Hong Kong Police Force.
- Tsang Siu-kan, Station Sergeant, Royal Hong Kong Police Force.

=== Queen's Commendation for Valuable Service in the Air ===
Royal Navy

- Fleet Chief Aircrewman Norman Anning, J911134Y.
- Lieutenant Commander Philip Anthony Shaw, MVO.

Royal Air Force

- Squadron Leader Edward Christopher Rodney Dicks (608401).
- Squadron Leader John Reginald James Froud (3512190).
- Squadron Leader Russell Alan Ingham (2623021).
- Squadron Leader Ian Peter Kenvyn (8020975).
- Flight Lieutenant Robin Peter Chambers (5203155).
- Flight Lieutenant (now Acting Squadron Leader) Christopher James Gowers (8026349).
- Flight Lieutenant Stephen Charles Riley (8025207).
- Flight Lieutenant Richard Turner Warner (4277898).

United Kingdom

- Godfrey Bowles, Chief Pilot, Flight Operations Division, British Caledonian Airways Ltd.
- John Alan Spencer, Senior Captain and Training Captain, Air UK.

== Cook Islands ==
=== Order of the British Empire ===
==== Officer of the Order of the British Empire (OBE) ====
Civil Division

- Pokino Aberahama For services to the Cook Islands, especially the people of Mangaia.

=== British Empire Medal (BEM) ===
Civil Division

- Pari Tamarua, JP. For services to women and children.

== Barbados ==
=== Order of the British Empire ===
==== Commander of the Order of the British Empire (CBE) ====
Civil Division

- Harold Gittens Brewster, MBE, Deputy High Commissioner for Barbados in the United Kingdom.

==== Member of the Order of the British Empire (MBE) ====
Civil Division

- Joel Garner. For services to cricket.
- Gordon Greenidge. For services to cricket.
- Hansel LeRoy Jordan. Chairman of the Barbados Association, Birmingham.

== Mauritius ==
=== Order of the British Empire ===
==== Commander of the Order of the British Empire (CBE) ====
Civil Division

- Ahmode Mohamed Kathrada. For services to commerce and industry.
- Locknat Daby Seesaram. For contribution to local government.

==== Officer of the Order of the British Empire (OBE) ====
Civil Division

- Dr. Rayapen Chavrimootoo. For services to the community.
- Hallooman Doobey Girdharee. For services to the community.
- Dr. Mahmood Joomye. For services to the community.
- Roland Maugendre. For public service.
- Joseph Alfred Freddy Pursun. For services to the community.
- Dr. Ah Yen Wong Shiu Leung. For public service.

==== Member of the Order of the British Empire (MBE) ====
Civil Division

- Dhundev Bauhadoor. For services to the community.
- Narain Bucktowsing. For public service.
- Tamayah Kamayah. For services to the community.
- Appalamma Lallah (Mrs. Toolsaya). For services to the community.
- Marie Rita Ivy Rochecouste. For services to the community.
- Isram Sonoo. For services to the community.

=== Queen's Police Medal (QPM) ===
- Bhardwoze Juggernauth, Commissioner, Mauritius Police Force.

=== Mauritius Police Medal ===
- Joseph Cyrille Michel Comarmond, Superintendent, Mauritius Police Force.
- Mohun Parsad Dassyne, Police Constable, Mauritius Police Force.
- Joseph France Etienne, Assistant Superintendent, Mauritius Police Force.
- Louis Eddie Samfat, Quartermaster, Mauritius Police Force.

== Fiji ==
=== Order of the British Empire ===
==== Knight Commander of the Order of the British Empire (KBE) ====
Civil Division

- John Sutherland Thomson, CMG, MBE, Chairman, Economic Development Board.

==== Commander of the Order of the British Empire (CBE) ====
Civil Division

- Mahendra Motibhai Patel. For services to commerce and industry.

==== Officer of the Order of the British Empire (OBE) ====
Civil Division

- Frederick Henry Gibson. Liaison Officer, Fiji Electricity Authority.
- Ben Mohammed Jannif, MBE. For service to the nation.
- Bulou Eta Vosailagi. For service to the community.

==== Member of the Order of the British Empire (MBE) ====
Civil Division

- Sister Mary Gaeten. For services to the community.
- Jone Gusuiloa Leweni. For services to farming.
- Robin Mercer. For services to the community.
- Vasu Dewan Shankaran. For services to the community.

== Bahamas ==
=== Order of the British Empire ===
==== Commander of the Order of the British Empire (CBE) ====
Civil Division

- Sherlin Clarence Bootle. For services to the people of Abaco.
- Richard Frederick Anthony Roberts, High Commissioner to the United Kingdom for The Bahamas.

==== Officer of the Order of the British Empire (OBE) ====
Civil Division

- Harold Alexander Munnings, Permanent Secretary. (Re-employed pensioner).
- Herbert Clarence Walkine, Permanent Secretary.

==== Member of the Order of the British Empire (MBE) ====
Civil Division

- Erma Geraldine Cosford. For service at Government House.
- Samuel Leonard Isaacs. For Public service.
- Cynthia Mary Love. For services to education.
- Leo Raymond Pinder, JP. For services to the Fishing industry.
- Joyce Rolle. For services to the community.
- Mayrona Seymour. For services to education.

=== British Empire Medal (BEM) ===
Civil Division

- Marilyn Grenada Dames. For community service.
- Osbome Alphonso Ferguson. Sergeant, Royal Bahamas Police Force.
- Leon Harold Knowles. Chief Executive Officer, Her Majesty's Prisons.
- Prince Albert Munroe. For community service.
- King Richard Nixon. Senior Superintendent, Ministry of Education.
- Florence Mursay Poitier. For services to education.

== Papua New Guinea ==
=== Order of the British Empire ===
==== Knight Commander of the Order of the British Empire (KBE) ====
Civil Division

- Alkan Tololo, CBE. For public service.

==== Commander of the Order of the British Empire (CBE) ====
Civil Division

- Theodore Reginald Bredmeyer. For service to law.

==== Officer of the Order of the British Empire (OBE) ====
Military Division

- Colonel Lima Dotaona (870542), Papua New Guinea Defence Force.

Civil Division

- Joseph Faupungu Aisa. For services to law.
- Warren Hebert DeCourcy Dutton. For services to politics.
- Ranyeta Kitilo Pokati. For community services.
- Peter Franklyn Nicholls. For services to banking and commerce.
- Vin ToBaining, MBE. For services to community.

==== Member of the Order of the British Empire (MBE) ====
Military Division

- Lieutenant Colonel David Nare Josiah (84048), Papua New Guinea Defence Force.
- Major Matthew Sigere (84121), Papua New Guinea Defence Force.
- Major Kadakayaula Sigllitala (84702), Papua New Guinea Defence Force.

Civil Division

- Molat Aumbou. For services to community and politics.
- Ronald Eric Burgess. For professional services.
- Henry Thomas Fabila. For community service.
- Roger Anthony Gillbanks. For service to oil palm industry.
- Conway Sesewo Ihove. For services to politics.
- Anskar Namiet Karmel. For community service.
- Werner Henrick Knoll. For services to community.
- Edward Henry Harvey. For public service.
- Paul Bosco Yuck Leong Ning. For service to community.
- Thomas Baha Ritako. For public service.
- Ila Sam. For public service.

=== British Empire Medal (BEM) ===
Military Division

- Sergeant Fred Guri (83538), Papua New Guinea Defence Force.
- Sergeant Dick Larry (84451), Papua New Guinea Defence Force.
- Lance Corporal Imora Tom (82411), Papua New Guinea Defence Force.

Civil Division

- Marcella Asor. For service to women.
- Robert Bruce Duncan. For service to Cocoa industry.
- David Kambe, Chief Assistant Correctional Officer.
- Boro Konafa, For community service.
- Tom Maraf. For service to the community.
- Nohagare Mitio. For service to the community.
- Aban Molompi, Sergeant, Royal Papua New Guinea Constabulary.
- Robert Ian Oatley. For service to the Coffee industry.
- Michael Laurence Pendrigh. For public service.
- Jack Pidik. For services to sporting and social activity.
- Joseph Gavia Reu. For service to the community.
- Silih Sawi. For service to community welfare.
- Mara Tup, Sergeant, Royal Papua New Guinea Constabulary.
- Gabriel Auina Wai. For public service.

== Solomon Islands ==
=== Knight Bachelor ===
- David Dawea Taukala, MBE. For public service.

=== Order of the British Empire ===
==== Officer of the Order of the British Empire (OBE) ====
Civil Division

- Harry James Broughton, Registrar General.
- Moala Pada, Superintendent of Police, Royal Solomon Islands Police Force.

==== Member of the Order of the British Empire (MBE) ====
Civil Division

- Paul Misiga, Chief Education Officer, Ministry of Education.

=== British Empire Medal (BEM) ===
Civil Division

- Kabiri Bobai. For public service.
- Lemuel Liolea, President Malaita Local Court.
- Piti Maeke, Senior Development Officer, Ministry of Employment, Youth and Social Development.

== Tuvalu ==
=== Order of the British Empire ===
==== Member of the Order of the British Empire (MBE) ====
Civil Division

- Maheu Naniseni, MP. For public service.

== Saint Lucia ==
=== Order of the British Empire ===
==== Officer of the Order of the British Empire (OBE) ====
Civil Division

- Stanislaus Anthony James, MBE. For services to the community.

==== Member of the Order of the British Empire (MBE) ====
Civil Division

- Ignatius York Felicien. For services to the community.
- Jones Euphraim Mendesoh. For services to the community.

=== British Empire Medal (BEM) ===
Civil Division

- Joseph Mathurin. For services to the community.
- Clarinda Valentine Riley. For services to the community.
- Philomene Irita Smith. For services to the community.

== Saint Vincent and the Grenadines ==
=== Order of Saint Michael and Saint George ===
==== Companion of the Order of St Michael and St George (CMG) ====
- Othniel Rudolph Sylvester. President of the Saint Vincent Bar Association.

=== Order of the British Empire ===
==== Officer of the Order of the British Empire (OBE) ====
Civil Division

- Fraustina Eileen Eustace. For public services.

==== Member of the Order of the British Empire (MBE) ====
Civil Division

- Charles Norman St. Clair Robinson. For public services.

== Antigua and Barbuda ==
=== Order of Saint Michael and Saint George ===
==== Companion of the Order of St Michael and St George (CMG) ====
- Ernest Emanuel Williams. Ambassador Extraordinary for the Government of Antigua and Barbuda.

=== Order of the British Empire ===
==== Officer of the Order of the British Empire (OBE) ====
Civil Division

- The Very Reverend Hilton Manasseh Carty, The Dean of Antigua.

==== Member of the Order of the British Empire (MBE) ====
Civil Division

- Genevieve Lewis Irene Benjamin, Chief Establishment Officer, Government of Antigua and Barbuda.

== Saint Christopher and Nevis ==
=== Order of the British Empire ===
==== Officer of the Order of the British Empire (OBE) ====
Civil Division

- Mary Charles George. For services to education.

==== Member of the Order of the British Empire (MBE) ====
Civil Division

- Weston Owen Parris. For services to the community.
- Pamela Llewellyn Wall. For services to the community.

=== British Empire Medal (BEM) ===
Civil Division

- Martha Delaney. For services to education.
