= McEvilly =

McEvilly is a surname. Notable people with the surname include:

- Bridget McEvilly (born 1946), English nurse and nursing administrator
- John McEvilly (1818–1902), Irish Roman Catholic archbishop
- Lee McEvilly (born 1982), English footballer
