= Cheng Yang-ping =

Hong Kong simultaneous interpreter

Y. P. Cheng 鄭仰平
- Born: 19 September 1929; Hong Kong
- Died: July 25, 2014 (aged 84); Nanchang, Jiangxi Province, China
- Occupation: Simultaneous interpreter

Cheng Yang-ping, MBE (Chinese: 鄭仰平, 19 September 1929 – 25 July 2014), more commonly known as Y. P. Cheng or just Y.P., was a Hong Kong simultaneous interpreter.

Cheng was admitted by the National Sun Yat-sen University in Canton, China, to study medicine in 1948. His study was interrupted in 1950 when he reunited with his family in Macau. In 1960, he was recruited by the All India Radio in Delhi, India, as a Chinese-language announcer. In 1965, he was recruited by the British Broadcasting Corporation radio station to perform interpretation and broadcasting work in the United Kingdom.

In April 1972, Cheng was appointed by the Hong Kong government as a Chief Interpreter (Simultaneous Interpretation) to help introduce Chinese-English simultaneous interpretation service for the Legislative Council. When the United Kingdom and the People's Republic of China conducted successive rounds of negotiations over the sovereignty of Hong Kong between 1982 and 1984, he was the chief interpreter for the British delegation, serving various British representatives including Prime Minister Margaret Thatcher, Governor of Hong Kong Sir Edward Youde and British Ambassador to China Sir Percy Cradock, etc. After the Sino-British Joint Declaration was signed on 19 December 1984, he was appointed a Member of the Order of the British Empire in the New Year Honours of 1985 in recognition of his service. Before retiring from the government in 1987, he was further promoted to the rank of Chief Conference Interpreter in June 1986.
