= Michael Carlisle =

British marine engineer (born 1929)

Sir John Michael Carlisle (born 16 December 1929) is a British marine engineer.

== Early life and education ==
Carlisle was born in Sheffield, the son of John Hugh Carlisle and Lilian Amy Smith. He was educated at King Edward VII School (photo), and then the University of Sheffield where he studied mechanical engineering.

== Career ==
After service in the Royal Navy, he spent his working life in the marine engineering industry, supplying and reconditioning major engine components for large marine diesel engines, from UK and overseas factories and joint ventures. From 1967 to 1968, he was President of the Sheffield Junior Chamber of Commerce, now known as Junior Chamber International (JCI) Sheffield. From 1969, he was involved with the NHS, and served as Chairman of many Authorities and Trusts, including Trent Regional Health Authority from 1982-94. He was a Council Member of the Medical Research Council from 1991–95 and on the NHS Policy Board from 1994 to 95. He was awarded a knighthood in 1985.

Sir Michael Carlisle joined the University Council of the University of York in 1990, and became a Pro-Chancellor in November 2000, and also Vice-Chair of Council. He has been a member of several University Committees, including Policy and Resources during the tenure of the current Vice-Chancellor and his predecessor. He is a member of the University Court. He has also served as Chair of the York Health Economics Consortium, and as a non-executive director of York Science Park Ltd since its incorporation. He was also a non-executive director of several other companies. He was a member of the HYMS Board since it was established until 2007.

He has a NHS mental health hospital named after him, the Michael Carlisle Centre, which occupies the former Nether Edge Hospital site in Sheffield.

From 2007 to 2012, he was Chairman of Scarborough & N E Yorkshire Healthcare Trust and led the strategy to integrate that Trust with York Hospital NHS FT, to eliminate the outstanding debt and provide further capital expenditure. He also served as Lay Chair of the Fitness to Practise Committee of the Hull York Medical School (HYMS). He holds honorary degrees of LLD from the Universities of Sheffield and Nottingham, and a D Univ from York in 1998. Since 2014 he has been Chair of Healthwatch North Yorkshire.

He was awarded a knighthood in the 1985 New Year Honours.
