= Gordon Henry Newstead =

Australian electrical engineer

Gordon Henry Newstead OBE
- Born: 1 July 1917; Cairo, Egypt
- Died: 1 November 1987 (aged 70); Hobart, Tasmania

Academic background
- Education: University of Melbourne

Gordon Henry Newstead OBE (1 July 1917 – 1 November 1987) was an Australian electrical engineering professor at University of Tasmania and Australian National University.

== Early life and education ==
Gordon Henry Newstead was born on 1 July 1917 in Cairo, Egypt to Julius Leonard Neustadt and wife Eleanor Sarah (née Culmer). Julius was born in Sydney and served in the Australian Imperial Forces; Eleanor was born in England and served as a nurse. His family moved to Australia in late 1917 and changed the family name from Neustadt to Newstead. He grew up in Melbourne and graduated from Melbourne High School. He attended University of Melbourne where he got his Bachelor's in Electrical Engineering in 1940, and his Master's in 1945 with a master's thesis "Engineering Radio". He was a senior demonstrator in electrical engineering in 1940 and worked with the Department of Civil Aviation from 1941 to 1944.

== Career ==
He became a lecturer at University of Tasmania in 1944, and a senior lecturer there in 1949. He studied low frequency radio astronomy. In 1956, he had a brief position as a reader at University of Adelaide and then in 1957, he became a Foundation professor at University of Tasmania, where he taught for nine years and occasionally served as a dean. He also served as an associate-commissioner of the Hydro-Electric Commission from 1957 to 1984, and the president of the Institution of Engineers Tasmanian division in 1963. He also served as an overseas representative of the British Institution of Electrical Engineers.

In 1965, he moved to Australian National University in Canberra where he served as a consultant to their Research School of Physical Sciences on their homopolar generator project. He stayed there and was appointed professor and head of their department of engineering physics. He was also a deputy master at University House there. In 1969 he co-edited the third edition of An Introduction to the Laplace Transformation with Engineering Application with J. C. Jaeger.

== Retirement ==
Newstead retired from ANU in 1970 as an emeritus professor, and returned to Hobart in Tasmania. He served as a council-member of the Tasmanian College of Advanced Education from 1972 to 1976 and on the Tertiary Education Commission's Advanced Education Council from 1977 to 1985. In 1979 he was chairman of the Tasmania Energy Research Committee. In 1985, he received the OBE for services in the power industry.

== Personal life ==
Newstead married Betty McCarthy in 1944 at St Peter's Church of England, Brighton Beach. d. 1986. They have two children.

== Death ==
Newstead died on 1 November 1987 in Hobart. He is buried in South Arm.

== Notable publications ==
- General Circuit Theory, Methuen monograph, 1959
- An Introduction to the Laplace Transformation with Engineering Application, with C.J. Jaeger, 3rd ed., Methuen monograph, 1969, ISBN 9780412206801
