= Elizabeth Raybould =

- Born: Walsall, United Kingdom
- Died: Lymington, United Kingdom
- Occupation: Nurse / Nursing Educator / Fellow of the Royal College of Nursing.
- Known for: Developing nursing education and nursing as a profession.
- Medical career
- Notable works: Basic Nursing (1963), A Guide to Medical and Surgical Nursing (1965), A History of the General Nursing Council for England and Wales (1969), A Guide for Teachers of Nursing (1975), A Guide for Nurse Managers (1977).

Elizabeth Raybould, OBE, FRCN (18 June 1926 – 3 May 2015) was an English nurse and nursing educator credited with helping to create a new organisational structure for nursing education in Northern Ireland, with a heavy emphasis on the development of nursing as a profession, and the preparation and training of safe practitioners.

Raybould was born in Walsall, West Midlands. She retired in 1983 from nursing and nurse education after some 25 years. She was named an Officer of the Order of the British Empire for her services to the British healthcare system and in 1978 was made a Fellow of the Royal College of Nursing.

She died in Lymington, Hampshire in 2015.

== Publications ==
- Co-author of Basic Nursing (1963)
- Co-author of A Guide to Medical and Surgical Nursing (1965)
- Co-author of A History of the General Nursing Council for England and Wales (1969)
- Editor: A Guide for Teachers of Nursing (1975)
- Editor: A Guide for Nurse Managers (1977)

== Legacy ==
- Elizabeth Raybould Centre (Kent, England)
