= John Foster (environmentalist) =

British environmentalist

John Foster, CBE (13 August 1920 – 6 July 2020) was a British environmentalist. He was the first head of the Peak District National Park, the United Kingdom's first national park. He was later the first head of the Countryside Commission for Scotland.
