= Keith Burch =

British Army general (1931–2013)

Major-General Keith Burch CB CBE
- Born: 31 May 1931
- Died: 27 March 2013 (aged 81)
- Military career
- Allegiance: United Kingdom
- Branch: British Army
- Rank: Major-General
- Awards: CB CBE
- Other work: Chapter clerk of York Minster

Major-General Keith Burch CB CBE (31 May 1931 – 27 March 2013) was a senior officer in the British Army. His obituary in The Times described him as 'a soldier who commanded with a firm, determined hand in Hong Kong, Aden, Cyprus and Germany'.

== Early life ==
Keith Burch was born 31 May 1931, the son of Christopher Burch and Gwendoline Ada (née James). He was educated at Bedford Modern School and Sandhurst.

== Career ==
In 1951, Burch was commissioned into the Essex Regiment. He was sent to Korea in 1953 with the 1st Battalion as his patrol's platoon commander, building defences along the Korean ceasefire line for over a year. The 1st Essex later moved to Hong Kong where 'he exercised his authority as senior subaltern without fear or favour'.

In 1954, the Essex Regiment merged into what became the Royal Anglian Regiment following which Burch held a junior staff appointment in Kenya before attending the Staff College, Camberley. Having qualified at Camberley, he was appointed to the Staff Duties branch of the Army Department of the Ministry of Defence and was appointed MBE on leaving in 1965.

Burch saw active service with the 4th (Leicestershire) Battalion in Aden, served in Malta, and was subsequently recalled to Camberley as a member of the Directing Staff. In 1969, he was promoted Lieutenant-Colonel to command the 3rd Battalion of the Royal Anglian Regiment in Aldershot, Cyprus and Germany.

In 1976 Burch was promoted to colonel and appointed Chief of Staff of the 2nd Armoured Division in Germany, then commanded by Major-General Sir Frank Kitson. Kitson 'appreciated a man who planned thoroughly and got things done without fuss'. He was subsequently made CBE and promoted to brigadier as Director of Administrative Planning in the Army Department of the Ministry of Defence.

In 1981 he attended the Indian National Defence College, New Delhi, before being appointed Deputy Director Army Staff Duties at the Ministry of Defence (1982–83). His final military posts were at the rank of Major-General as Assistant Chief of the Defence Staff (Personnel and Logistics) and Director Personnel in the Ministry of Defence from 1983 to 1985.

== Awards and honours ==
Burch was made MBE in 1965, CBE in 1977 and Companion Order of the Bath in 1985.

== Personal life ==
In 1953 and whilst an officer, he competed in middle distance competitive running in Hong Kong, holding the Crown Colony's record for the 800 and 1500 metres. In 1957, Burch married Sara Vivette Hales; they had one son and two daughters.

Following his retirement from the army, Burch was appointed Chapter Clerk of York Minster between 1985 and 1995. During this period, Burch also served as County President of the Royal British Legion.

In 2006 he and his wife emigrated to New Zealand.

Burch died on The Yellow Sea (Huang Hai) on 27 March 2013. He was survived by his wife, Sara, his son, Giles, and two daughters, Amanda and Emma.
