= Charlotte Kratz =

Nurse and nursing educator from the United Kingdom (1922–2006)

- Born: 5 May 1922; Dortmund Germany
- Died: 3 October 2006 (aged 84); Eastbourne, East Sussex
- Known for: Her work as a pioneer of nursing research in the UK
- Honours: MBE, FRCN, PhD

Charlotte Regina Kratz MBE, FRCN, PhD (5 May 1922 – 3 October 2006) was a trained nurse from the United Kingdom known for her pioneering community health work.

== Early life ==
Kratz was born in Dortmund, Germany. She was the only child of Norbert and Johanna Kratz. She went to Storrington School in Westcliff-on-Sea, England, to escape the persecution of the Jewish people in Germany.

== Nursing career ==
Kratz started her nurse training at The Nightingale Training School for Nurses, St Thomas' Hospital, in 1944. It took two years to gain a training place due to her status as an alien. As her training was during the war she did the practical component at the Royal Infirmary of Edinburgh. She completed her training in 1947 and registered as a nurse in March 1948. Kratz specialised in community nursing. She trained as a district nurse working with Berkshire County Council as a district nurse, midwife and health visitor in Lambourn, Berkshire. She completed her midwifery training at the Woolwich Hospital for Mothers and Babies and Lady Raleigh District Nursing Home, Leytonstone.

From 1959 to 1963, Kratz worked as the Superintendent of Dar es Salaam District Nursing Service in Tanganyika (now Tanzania). She used this experience to campaign for special training for community nurses in the UK. When she returned to England she took a community nurse tutor course at the Royal College of Nursing (RCN). She became the UK's first community health tutor at the Royal Free Hospital in 1965. Kratz also spent her time campaigning for district nursing, freelancing with the Nursing Times, until she retired in 1988. The Nursing Times took on the District Nurses Action Campaign due to her influence, and Kratz was elected to the newly formed English National Board for Nursing and to the United Kingdom Council for Nursing, Midwifery and Health Visiting.

Kratz was the first nurse to graduate as a doctor of philosophy. She completed her PhD in 1974 focusing on long term care of stroke patients.

Kratz was a founder member of staff at the Department of Nursing at the University of Manchester.

Kratz is regarded as one of three pioneers of nursing research along with Professor Jean McFarlane, and Dr Dorothy Baker at the University of Manchester who inculcated an interest in nursing research.

Kratz was a member of the working party on the education and training of district nurses while she was a Senior Research Fellow and Head of the Nursing Research Group at the Department of Nursing at the University of Manchester.

== Death ==
She died on 3 October 2006 age 84 in Eastbourne, East Sussex.

== Honours ==
In 1983 she was elected Fellow of the Royal College of Nursing.

In 1985 Kratz was appointed Member of the British Empire.

== Bibliography ==
- Kratz, Charlotte R. (1975-01-01). "Participant observation in dyadic and triadic situations". International Journal of Nursing Studies. 12 (3): 169–174. doi:10.1016/0020-7489(75)90011-5. ISSN 0020-7489. PMID 810446.
- Kratz, Charlotte R. (January 1976). "Some determinants of care of patients with stroke who were nursed in their own homes". Journal of Advanced Nursing. 1 (1): 89–96. doi:10.1111/j.1365-2648.1976.tb00430.x. ISSN 0309-2402. PMID 1044633.
- Kratz, Charlotte (1979). The nursing process. University of Michigan.
- Kratz, Charlotte R. (1980). Care of the long-term, sick in the community : particularly patients with stroke. Churchill Livingstone. ISBN 0-443-01689-5. OCLC 256224153.
- Kratz, CR; Barber, JH (1980). Towards team care. Churchill Livingstone.
- Kratz, Charlotte (1983). Problems of care of the long-term sick in the community with particular reference to patients with stroke (PhD thesis.). Manchester: University of Manchester. OCLC 1026430513.
- Kratz, Charlotte R. (1982). The management of the nursing process : a conference at the King's Fund Centre Friday 23 April 1982. King's Fund Centre. OCLC 818426014.
- Kratz, Charlotte R. (1983-01-01). "Learning to pass—a report of a study of graduates from the Department of Nursing, Western Australian Institute of Technology, Perth". International Journal of Nursing Studies. 20 (3): 149–162. doi:10.1016/0020-7489(83)90054-8. ISSN 0020-7489. PMID 6558012.
- Kratz, Charlotte (1989-01-07). "Widening the entry gate". Nursing Standard. 3 (15): 6. doi:10.7748/ns.3.15.6.s15. ISSN 0029-6570.
