= Hilton Carty =

Antiguan Anglican clergyman (born 1921)

Hilton Manasseh Carty OBE (born 13 June 1921) was the Dean of Antigua from 1977 until 1986.

Born in Antigua, Carty was educated at Codrington College in Saint John, Barbados, and in 1945 ordained in British Guiana by the Archbishop of the West Indies. Remaining there, he served as assistant priest in New Amsterdam and Georgetown, then was priest-in-charge in Demerara and parish priest of several churches, the last of which was St Paul’s, Plaisance. Having spent the early part of his career in British Guiana, in 1960 Carty migrated to Bristol, England, as assistant priest at St Agnes Church, in St Pauls Parish, to do general pastoral work there.

In September 1965 came Carty’s landmark appointment as priest in charge of St Francis’s Church, Cowley, Oxfordshire, which was widely reported by the Associated Press. In a story in The Telegraph of Nashua, New Hampshire, headed "Negro Parish Priest", Carty was reported to be to be "the first negro priest to take over a Church of England parish". The Cowley Chronicle of September 1965 reported that Carty was "especially interested in religious plays and pageants as a means of teaching the Christian Faith" and that he brought with him his wife and their four children.

In 1973 Carty became Vicar of St Bartholomew’s, Reading, before in 1977 he returned to the Caribbean as Dean of St John's Cathedral in St John's, Antigua. Soon after that he complained in a Sunday sermon that the traditional hymns "all tell us to give thanks to God but are mostly written for people accustomed to colder climates".

In 1984 Carty was appointed as an Officer of the Order of the British Empire. He retired as Dean of Antigua in 1986.
