= Charles Horan (police officer) =

British police detective

Charles Gerard Horan OBE QPM (23 November 1923, Manchester – 15 June 2009, Manchester) was a British police detective for nearly 40 years following his service in the Second World War and a former Assistant Chief Constable of Greater Manchester Police in charge of the CID.

== Career ==
In 1976, he was awarded The Queen's Police Medal for long and distinguished service.

In 1982, he received a commendation for outstanding service in connection with Pope John Paul II's visit to Manchester. He had special responsibility for co-ordinating security, which was a major task because of an earlier attempt on the Pope's life.

In 1984, he retired and was awarded the OBE.

In his distinguished career he was involved in hundreds of murder inquiries and earned a reputation as a "super-sleuth". To reporters, he was known as Manchester's Maigret, after the fictional Parisian detective. He jailed several cells of the I.R.A. bombers at the height of the terrorist threat and achieved a 97 per cent murder detection rate in the 10 years that he led the C.I.D.

On his retirement, he told the Manchester Evening News: "I am not what you'd call an educated man and I have never been to the police college. But I pride myself in being shrewd enough to spot a villain."

Colleague, friend and former Deputy Chief Constable John Stalker: "I don't use these words lightly, but the man was a legend. He was the best detective I ever met, a superb investigator. He was respected not just in Manchester, but nationally. He was a man who had his feet firmly on the ground and was very approachable. He was born and raised in Manchester, left school at 14 and didn't go to university but he was immensely intelligent, very articulate and a wonderful writer of reports. He was a life-long Manchester City fan and had a season ticket. The only time I ever saw him speechless was when we organised an 80th birthday party for him and invited along a lot of the former players like Mike Summerbee and Francis Lee."

Granada T.V. had discussions with Horan regarding a proposed drama series based on the Caminada stories, many of which were located on the actual site of the T.V. studios. Mr Horan agreed to act as an advisor to the programmes before his death.

== Honours ==
- Officer of the Order of the British Empire
- Queen's Police Medal
