= Bridget McEvilly =

British Army nurse and nursing administrator (1946–2024)

- Born: 1946; Middlesex, England
- Died: 22 January 2024 (aged 77)
- Military career
- Allegiance: United Kingdom
- Branch: British Army
- Service years: 1977–2002
- Rank: Colonel
- Commands: Queen Alexandra's Royal Army Nursing Corps (1999–2002)
- Awards: Commander of the Order of the British Empire; Associate of the Royal Red Cross

Colonel Bridget Christina McEvilly, CBE, ARRC (1946 – 22 January 2024) was a British Army nurse and nursing administrator who served as Director Army Nursing Services and Matron-in-Chief of the Queen Alexandra's Royal Army Nursing Corps (QARANC).

== Life and career ==
Born in Middlesex, McEvilly was commissioned in Queen Alexandra's Royal Army Nursing Corps (QARANC) in 1977, having previously been a nurse in hospitals in, among other places, Canada, London, and the Falkland Islands.

McEvilly was later a nursing administrator at the Ministry of Defence, and served as Assistant Director Army Nursing Services. She was awarded the Associate of the Royal Red Cross in the 1985 New Year Honours, and appointed a Commander of the Order of the British Empire in the 2002 New Year Honours.

== Death ==
McEvilly died after a long illness on 22 January 2024, at the age of 77.
