= Royal Agricultural Benevolent Institution =

Registered charity of England and Wales

- Abbreviation: RABI
- Formation: 1860; 166 years ago
- Founder: John Mechi
- Type: Registered charity
- Purpose: Provides tailored support to members of the farming community in need, who work or have worked in agriculture and their families.
- Location(s): England and Wales
- Patron: King Charles III
- President: Duke of Gloucester
- Chair: John Stanley FRAgS
- Chief Executive: Alicia Chivers

The Royal Agricultural Benevolent Institution (RABI) is a registered charity that offers financial, practical and emotional support to farming people in England and Wales. It assists people of all ages who work or have worked in farming, including their families and dependants.

== History ==
RABI was founded in 1860 by John Mechi, an Essex farmer and the son of an Italian businessman. His concern about poverty in the farming community led him to write to The Times to rally support for the formation of the institution. By 1860, he had received donations of 1,700 guineas and 450 pledges to make annual donations. Ironically, Mechi died poor. His affairs went into liquidation in 1880 and he died 12 days later, on Boxing Day, of encephalitis and ‘a broken heart’. In his last months the farmers of England subscribed £5,000 to help him out of insolvency but he died before he could benefit from it. The money – equivalent to £500,000 today – went to his family and included £200 from the Royal Bounty at the express wish of Prime Minister William Gladstone.

In 1935 King George V granted RABI a royal charter to mark its 75th anniversary. The charter was later amended in 1999 to extend the charity's support to farmworkers as well as farmers.

In 2001, an outbreak of Foot and Mouth disease among livestock in the UK caused a crisis in British farming and agriculture. During this time, RABI paid out around £9 million across the UK to more than 8,000 families.

== Management ==
RABI's patron is King Charles III, who succeeded his mother Queen Elizabeth II . The royal patronage has passed down succeeding monarchs from Queen Victoria. The current President of the institution is the Duke of Gloucester.

The charity is governed by a council of 11 trustees, who serve for four years but may be re-elected for a second term. John Stanley is the chair of the board.

The chief executive of RABI is Alicia Chivers, who succeeded Paul Burrows in 2018.

== Services ==
Historically, RABI's primary service has been providing grants to farming people in financial need, with the object of RABI defined as “The prevention and relief of need, hardship or distress in such manner as the Trustees in their discretion think fit to such persons who are, or have been, employed or engaged in the farming industry, or the dependants of such persons.”

As well as giving financial assistance, RABI can provide other support such as offering benefits advice, and aiding independent living.

Since 2021, RABI has also offered a range of emotional support services to help the mental wellbeing of farming people. The services provide farming people with direct access to counselling and mental health support. Professional mental health training is also offered.

== Care homes ==
The charity ran two residential care homes for elderly people, primarily with a background in agriculture.

RABI sold the care homes in 2022.
