= Australian Voluntary Hospital =

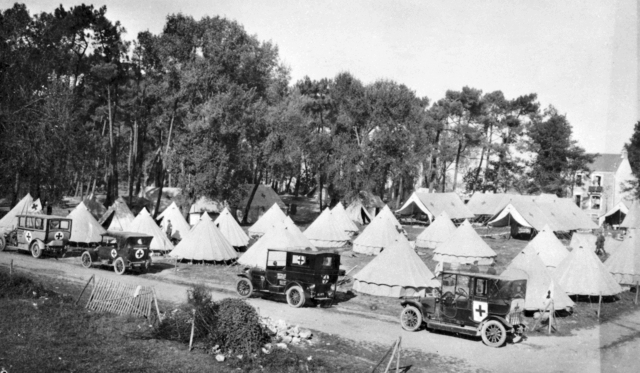
- Australian Volunteer Hospital, St Nazaire, France, 1914
- Active: 1914–1916
- Country: Australia
- Type: Medical
- Size: ~120 officers and men
- Engagements: World War I: Western Front

The Australian Voluntary Hospital was a military hospital staffed by Australian expatriates in England that served on the Western Front between 1914 and 1916. For most of the first year of the war, although not an Australian Army unit, it was an Australian presence on the Western Front.

== Origin ==
When the First World War broke out in August 1914, Rachel Ward, Countess of Dudley, the estranged wife of the former Governor-General of Australia, the Lord Dudley, decided to create a hospital from Australian doctors and nurses who were in the United Kingdom. She had previously set up the Lady Dudley Nurses in Ireland and the New South Wales Bush Nursing Association in Australia. There were relatively large numbers of Australian doctors and nurses because advanced qualifications required a trip overseas.

Lady Dudley discussed her proposal with King George V, and then with the Secretary of State for War, Lord Kitchener, and the British Army's Director General Army Medical Services, Sir Arthur Sloggett, who authorised the hospital. The hospital was formally offered to the British government by the Australian High Commissioner to the United Kingdom, Sir George Reid on 15 August 1914. Volunteers responded to advertisements that Lady Dudley placed in English newspapers on 17 August 1914. Women doctors were not accepted, but women nurses were welcomed.

The Australian Voluntary Hospital was commanded by Lieutenant Colonel William L'Estrange Eames, an officer in the Australian Army Medical Corps who had served in the Second Boer War, and was holidaying in England with his family at the time. He was unable to join the Australian Imperial Force (AIF), which was not accepting enlistments outside of Australia. He was granted the temporary rank of lieutenant colonel in the Royal Army Medical Corps. Ida Greaves, from Royal Newcastle Hospital, was appointed matron. The hospital soon reached a strength of 120 staff, of whom 36 were nurses. Others who were stationed in the hospital were Beachcroft Towse and Banjo Paterson who left an account of the hospital in his book Happy Dispatches.

== Operations ==
The Australian Voluntary Hospital assembled its personnel and equipment at a camp established on the grounds of the Ranelagh Club, which had been loaned for the purpose. It departed for France on 29 August 1914 on Lord Dunraven's yacht "Greta", which had been accepted by the Admiralty as a transport for medical units, and moved to Le Havre. Owing to the German advance, the hospital was evacuated to St Nazaire on 2 September, and reopened there 5 September. The 100-bed hospital was set up in a park under canvas, with a school and house close by rented for various facilities. It began receiving casualties from the retreat from Mons the next day.

On 26 October 1914, the Australian Voluntary Hospital moved to Wimereux, where it established a 200-bed hospital. The hospital was well equipped, with motor ambulances donated by organisations in Australia, a pathology laboratory and the only X-ray unit in the area. A day after it opened on 29 October, it began receiving patients from the First Battle of Ypres. Much of the unit's tents which accommodated the male personnel of the hospital were lost in a blizzard on 11 November 1914, and the men moved to the Golf club house of the Hôtel du Golf et Cosmopolite in Wimereux, which was eventually leased by the hospital, and became its officers' mess.

For a time, the Australian Voluntary Hospital was the only Australian presence on the Western Front until the arrival of two Mechanical transport companies of the Australian Army Service Corps which reached Rouen on 8 July 1915. Also in July, the senior surgeon and radiologist from the Australian Voluntary Hospital staff joined No. 3 Australian General Hospital, AIF, at Cairo, Egypt. In April 1916, Australian Army units began arriving from the Middle East in large numbers. No. 2 Australian General Hospital, AIF, arrived at Wimereux in June 1916. The Australian Voluntary Hospital was then absorbed into the British Army as No. 32 Stationary Hospital, with Eames remaining in command. By 1 May 1919, the hospital had treated 73,868 patients.

== Gallery ==
Australian Voluntary Hospital
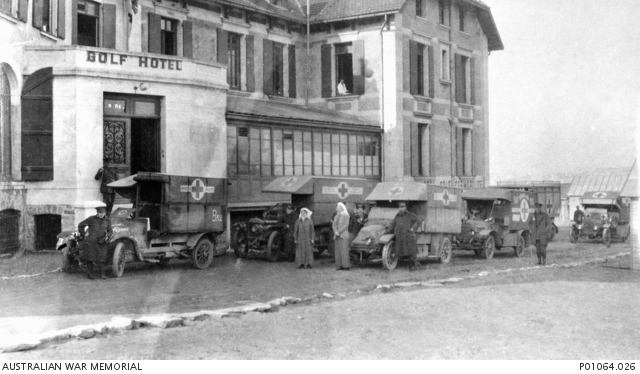
Ambulances outside the Australian Voluntary Hospital at the Hôtel du Golf et Cosmopolite in Wimereux. The ambulances carry signs indicating their donors, such as the "Red Cross Society, Queensland"

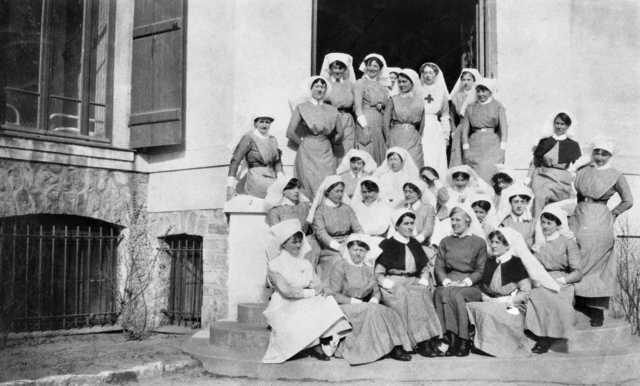
Nursing staff of the Australian Voluntary Hospital. Matron Ida Greaves is at the front, fourth from the left

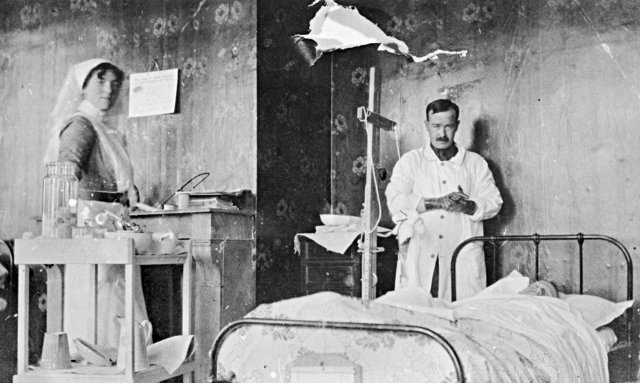
Staff Nurse May Miles and Captain R. V. MacDonnell tend to a patient
