= Rachel Ward, Countess of Dudley =

British civic leader and philanthropist

The Right Honourable The Countess of Dudley CBE RRC
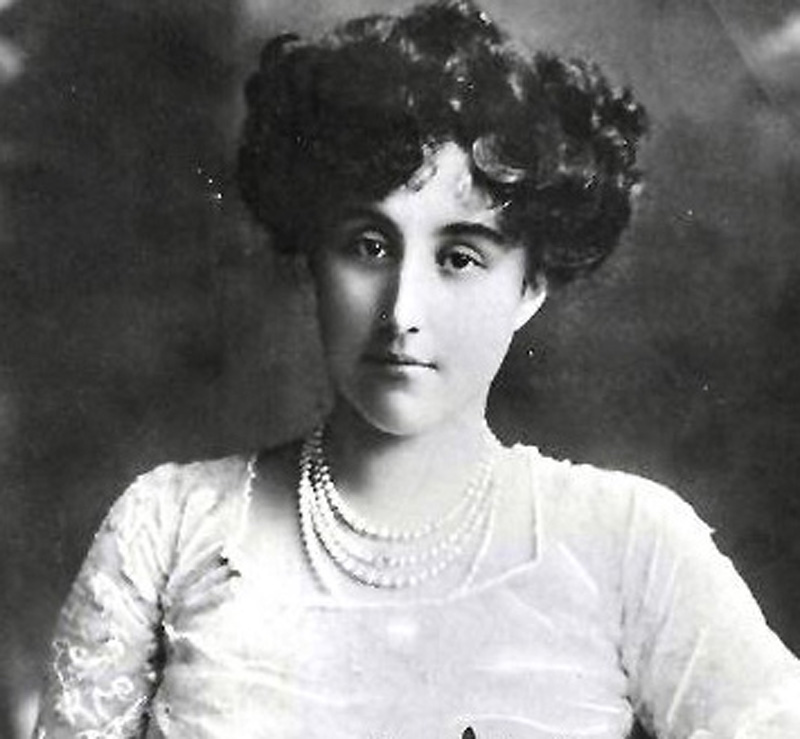

Spouse of the governor-general of Australia
- In office 9 September 1908 – 31 July 1911
- Monarchs: Edward VII; George V
- Prime Minister: Alfred Deakin; Andrew Fisher
- Governor: 2nd Earl of Dudley

Vicereine of Ireland
- In office 11 August 1902 – 11 December 1905
- Monarch: Edward VII
- Prime Minister: Arthur Balfour

Personal details
- Born: Rachel Gurney; 1867
- Died: 26 June 1920 (aged 52–53) County Galway
- Spouse: William Ward, 2nd Earl of Dudley
- Children: 7, including: William Ward, 3rd Earl of Dudley; George Ward, 1st Viscount Ward of Witley
- Occupation: philanthropist, political hostess
- Known for: WW1 work and founding a nursing association

Rachel Ward, Countess of Dudley CBE, RRC (born Rachel Gurney; 1867 – 26 June 1920) was a British civic leader and philanthropist. She founded the Lady Dudley Nurses in Ireland and the New South Wales Bush Nursing Association in Australia. Lady Dudley lived in Ireland while her husband served as Lord Lieutenant and in Australia as the consort of the Governor-General. After her marriage ended, she set up the Australian Voluntary Hospital in France in 1914 and she was awarded the Royal Red Cross and made a Commander of the Order of the British Empire.

== Life ==
Ward was born in 1867. She was the daughter of Charles Henry Gurney, of the wealthy Quaker banking and brewing family and Alice Marie Prinsep and granddaughter of Henry Thoby Prinsep and Sara Monckton (born Pattle). Her father died when she was ten, and her sister, Laura (later a writer) was eleven. She was taken in by the Marquess and Marchioness of Tavistock.

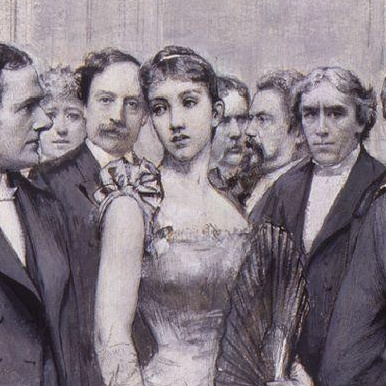
Lady Dudley in 1891 at the Royal Academy (detail from painting)

Through her grandfather, mother and her uncle the painter Valentine Cameron Prinsep she was brought up in contact with London's artistic circles. She featured in a number of portraits including two by George Frederick Watts and she was in a group painting, The Royal Society Conversazione, of the Royal Academy's soiree in 1891.

She became the Countess of Dudley when she married William Ward. He had been made the Earl of Dudley, and very rich, when he inherited his estate aged seventeen. He was made the Lord Lieutenant of Ireland and in 1903 she decided that she needed to do something for the poor people. While staying at Inver Lodge in Connemara she saw families who were just surviving. They had no access to doctors or medicine so small accidents, illness or pregnancy could be disastrous. Using her friends', her husband's, and her own influence, she set up the Lady Dudley Nurses. The first two, Elizabeth Cusack and Catherine Wills, were appointed in 1903. These nurses were based in the far western rural areas and they could supply expertise when it was required. The idea spread from Connemara and fundraising established similar nurses in County Mayo, County Kerry and County Donegal.

She and William had at least seven children, but by 1910 they were known to be estranged. The Earl's extra-marital behaviour was thought to be the cause and by 1912 they had separated.

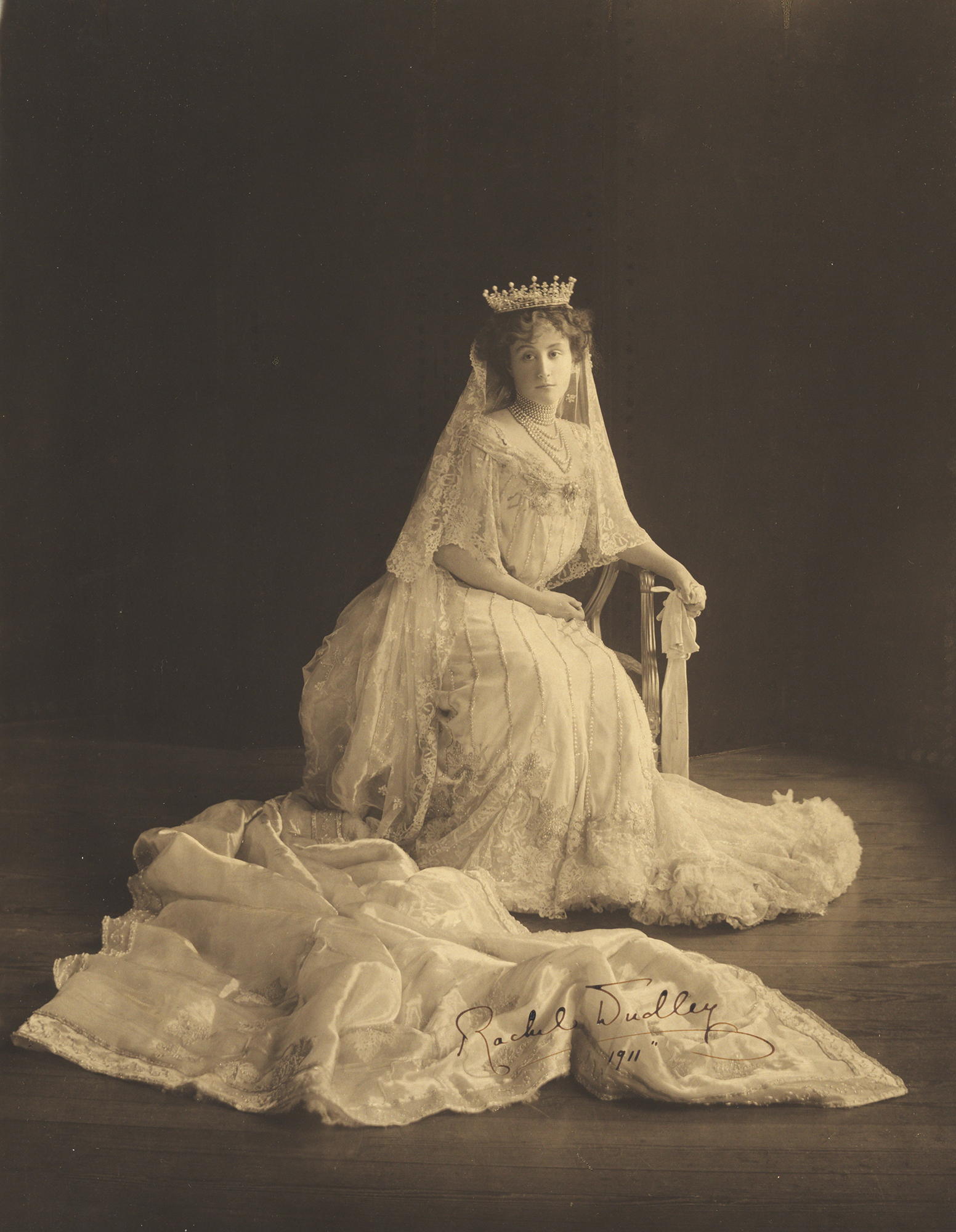
Portrait of Lady Rachel Dudley, London, 1911

She founded the New South Wales Bush Nursing Association in 1911. She had been discussing the idea for some time and her idea was featured in The Daily Telegraph in 1910. It was initially called the NSW Bush Association and its purpose was to "provide gratuitously or otherwise Trained Nurses and other requisites and attention for sick and injured persons in country towns and districts". Its success was assured when the National Council of Women became involved and the state supplied funding in 1912.

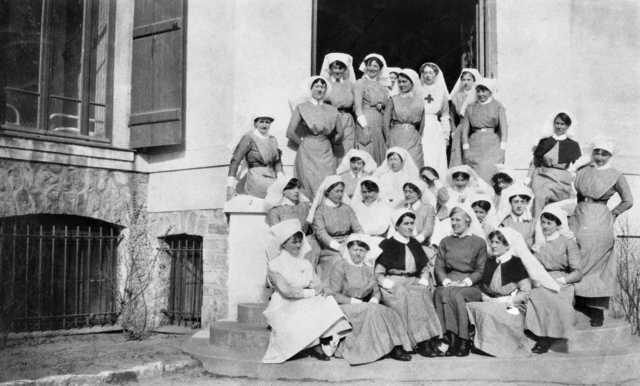
Nursing staff of the Australian Voluntary Hospital. Matron Ida Greaves is at the front, fourth from the left

During World War One her estranged husband was in Egypt and Gallipoli. She was in France where she established a club for Australian officers and the Australian Voluntary Hospital. There were relatively large numbers of Australian doctors and nurses because advanced qualifications required a trip overseas. She discussed her proposal with King George V, and then with the Secretary of State for War, Lord Kitchener, and the British Army's Director General Army Medical Services, Sir Arthur Sloggett, who authorised the hospital. The hospital was formally offered to the British government by the Australian High Commissioner to the United Kingdom, Sir George Reid on 15 August 1914. Volunteers responded to advertisements that Lady Dudley placed in English newspapers on 17 August 1914. Women doctors were not accepted, but women nurses like Matron Ida Greaves were welcomed.

In 1918, in recognition of her service, she was awarded the Royal Red Cross and she was made a Commander of the Order of the British Empire (CBE).

She was living alone at Screebe Lodge in County Galway in 1920. She died in a swimming accident in the sea on 26 June. Her former husband married the actress and singer Gertie Millar two months after Millar's husband died.
