= Buckhaven Lifeboat Station =

Former RNLI lifeboat station in Fife, Scotland

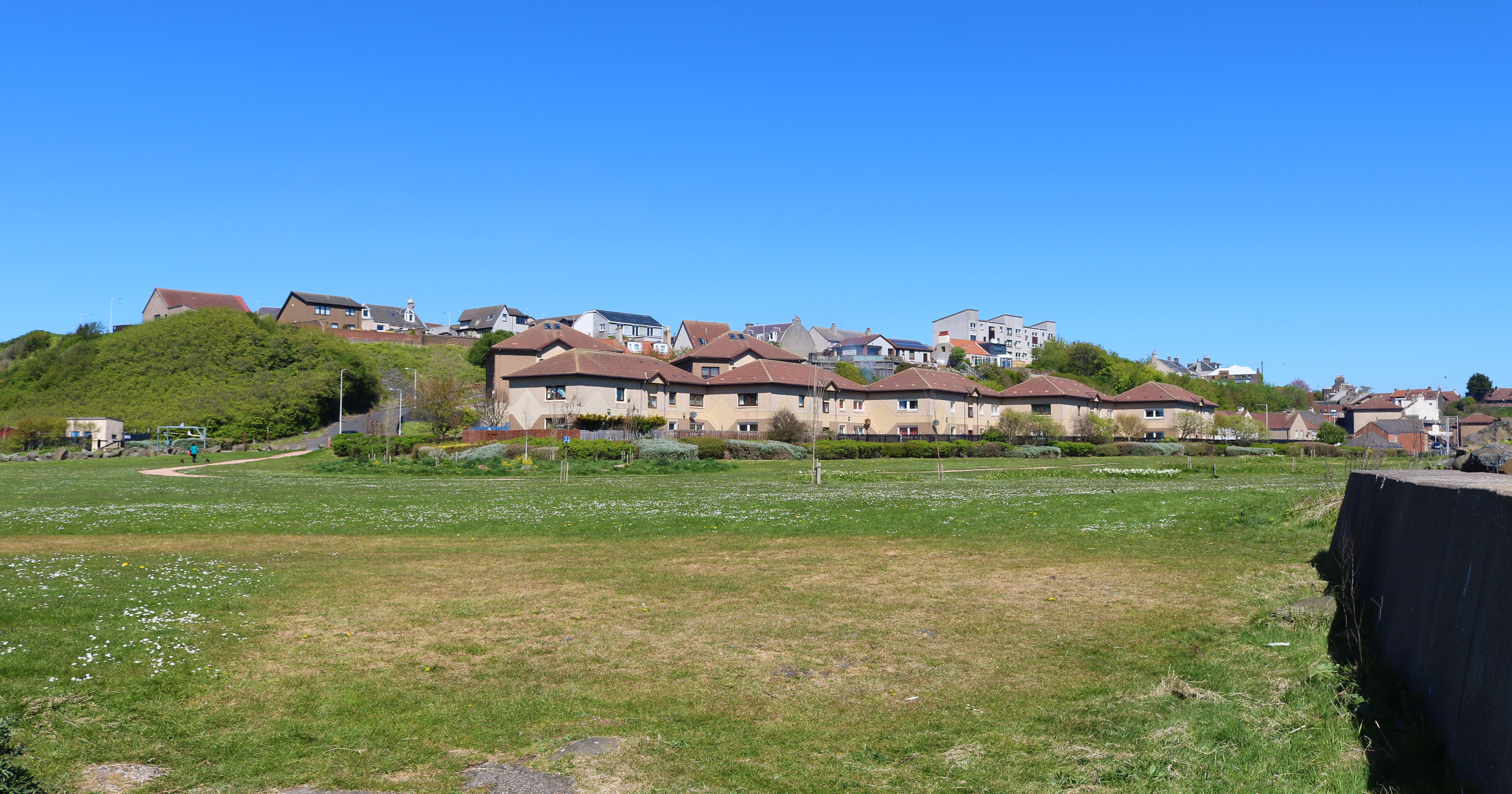
- Remains of Buckhaven harbour

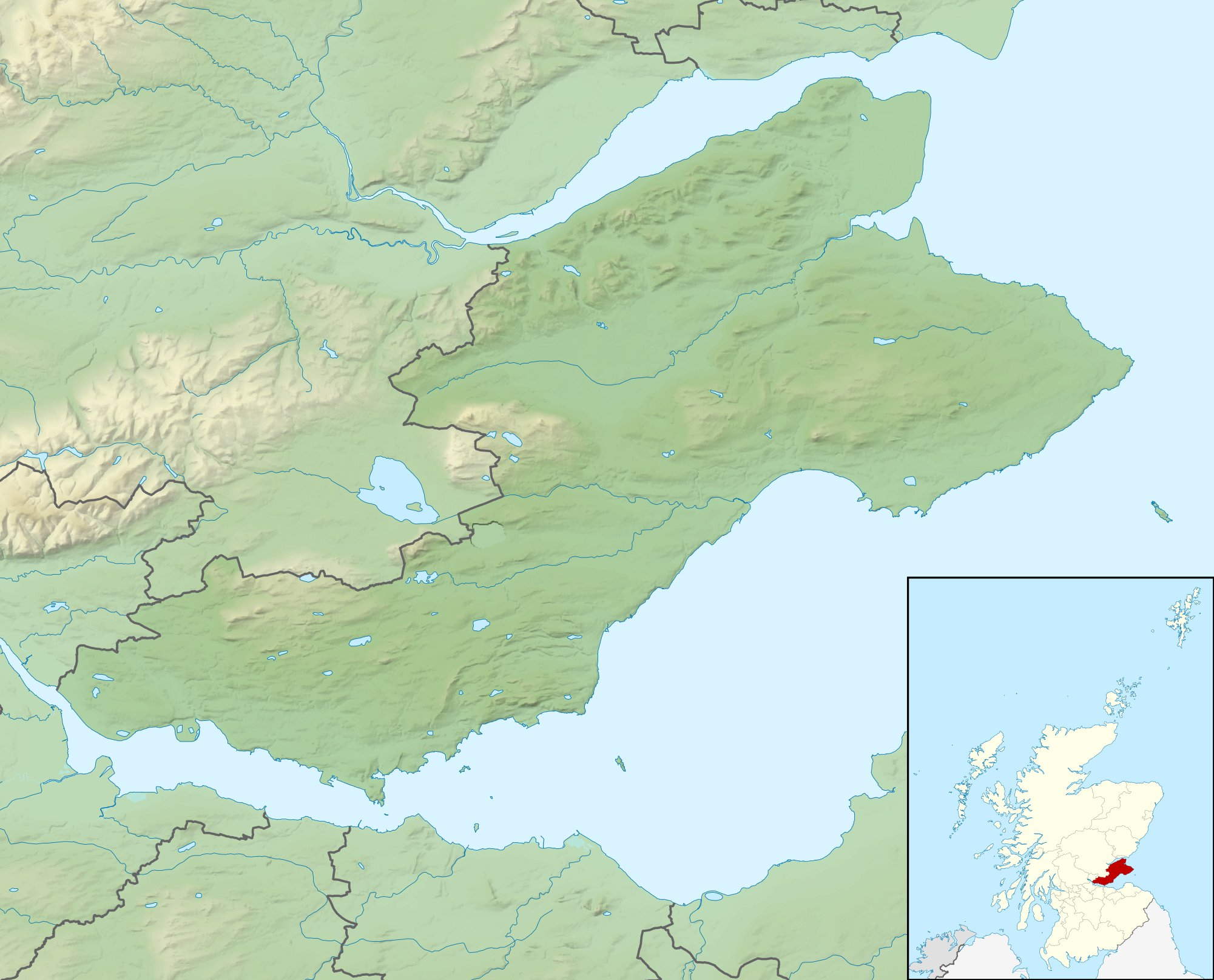
- Location within Fife

General information
- Status: Closed
- Location: Buckhaven Harbour, Buckhaven, Fife, KY8 1AP, Scotland
- Coordinates: 56°10′01.8″N 3°02′12.6″W
- Opened: 9 August 1900
- Closed: September 1932

Buckhaven Lifeboat Station was located at the top of Buckhaven Harbour at Buckhaven, a town overlooking the Firth of Forth, sitting on the south-east coast of the Fife peninsula, in Scotland.

A lifeboat was first placed at Buckhaven in 1900, by the Royal National Lifeboat Institution (RNLI).

After 32 years in operation, Buckhaven Lifeboat Station was closed in 1932.

== History ==
On application of local residents, and following the visit and report of the Deputy-Inspector of Lifeboats, at a meeting of the RNLI committee of management on Thursday 8 December 1898, it was decided to establish a new lifeboat station at Methil.

However, it was reported in the November 1900 journal of the RNLI, 'The Lifeboat', that a new station had been established at Buckhaven, located just to the south of Methil, "where there are plenty of fishermen available to work the Life-boat. There is a considerable number of vessels visiting this district in the course of the year, and several shipwrecks have occurred, with consequent risk of life to those on board in the absence of an efficient Life-boat."

A new lifeboat house and launching slipway was constructed at the head of the harbour at Buckhaven, built from the design and with the supervision of the engineer and architect of the Institution. A new 35-foot Liverpool-class non-self-righting 'Pulling and Sailing' (P&S) lifeboat was supplied to the station, arriving on 9 August 1900, along with its carriage, which was fitted with Tipping's 'Sand Plates', an endless plateway or jointed wheel tyre, fitted to the main wheels of the carriage, enabling the boat to be transferred over beach and soft sand.

The Institution received the legacy of £2000 from the late Mrs. Isabella Haxton of Kirkcaldy, for the provision of a lifeboat for the Fifeshire coast, and this sum was appropriated to the lifeboat and the establishment of the station. At a ceremony held in the harbour on 29 September 1900, at the donors request, the lifeboat was named Isabella (ON 441) by Sir John Gilmour.

The first call for the Buckhaven lifeboat would come on 21 December 1900. Isabella was launched to give assistance to the Russian schooner Ghido, in difficulties off Inchkeith.

On 3 September 1902, the Isabella was launched four times to the barque Nornen, which had been driven ashore at Largo. With the lifeboat Coxswain and Second Coxswain fishing away from Buckhaven, Bowman Robert Thomson was left to assemble a crew of local men, but after launch, they were forced to return for more experienced crew. Setting out for a second time with a partial crew, seven men were rescued, but the Master remained aboard. A third launch would see the lifeboat stand by the Nornen all night. The following day, the Methil tug took the seven crew back to the vessel to assist recovery of the boat, but the weather deteriorated, and the lifeboat launched a fourth time, and recovered all eight on board.

During the gale of 3 December 1913, Buckhaven lifeboat was launched to the aid of the William Yule, showing distress signals. The lifeboat stood by for 6 hours while the vessel was blown ever closer to the shore, until the Methil tug boat Rebecca arrived to set up a tow.

At a meeting of the RNLI committee of management on 14 July 1932, it was announced that effective from September 1932, Buckhaven Lifeboat Station would close.

The lifeboat on station at the time of closure, Isabella (ON 441), the only lifeboat to have been stationed at Buckhaven, was sold from service in 1932. There are no further records.

Buckhaven harbour suffered from silting and a decline in the fishing fleet. In the 1950s, its demise was completed, when the harbour was filled in by the council, with the northern harbour wall demolished. The lifeboat house, which had fallen into disrepair, was also demolished. The former site is now in the middle of a grass field.

== Buckhaven lifeboat ==
ON (Note: ON is the RNLI's Official Number of the boat.)	Name	Built	On station	Class	Comments
441	Isabella	1900	1900–1932	35-foot Liverpool (P&S)	(Note: 35-foot x 10-foot (12-oared) Liverpool-class non-self-righting (P&S) lifeboat, legacy of Mrs I. Haxton of Kirkcaldie, built by Thames Ironworks of Blackwall, London, costing £885.)

Station Closed in 1932

== See also ==
- List of RNLI stations
- List of former RNLI stations
- Royal National Lifeboat Institution lifeboats
