= Kirkcaldie =

Kirkcaldie is a Scottish surname.

Notable people with this name include:

- Constance Kirkcaldie, New Zealand arts administrator, winner of Chapman Tripp Theatre Award
- David Kirkcaldie (1848–1909), railway executive in New South Wales
- James Kirkcaldie (1875–1931), New Zealand cricketer
- John Kirkcaldie, New Zealand cyclist
- Rosa Angela Kirkcaldie (1887–1972), Australian nurse, daughter of David Kirkcaldie

also

- Kirkcaldie & Stains a.k.a. Kirkcaldie's, department store in Wellington, New Zealand
