= General Talbot =

General Talbot may refer to:

- Dennis Talbot (British Army officer) (1908–1994), British Army major general
- John Talbot, 1st Earl of Shrewsbury (c. 1387–1453), English Army general
- Norman Talbot (1914–1979), British Army lieutenant general
- Reginald Talbot (1841–1929), British Army major general
- Glenn Talbot (Marvel Cinematic Universe), appearing in TV series Agents of S.H.I.E.L.D. as General Talbot

== See also ==
- Bud Talbott (1892–1952), U.S. Air Force brigadier general
- Carlos Talbott (1920–2015), U.S. Air Force lieutenant general
