= Louis Lillywhite =

British Army general

Lieutenant General Louis Lillywhite CB MBE QHS FRCPGlas FRCGP
- Born: 23 February 1948 (age 78)
- Military career
- Allegiance: United Kingdom
- Branch: British Army
- Service years: 1968–2009
- Rank: Lieutenant General
- Commands: Master-General Army Medical Services (2017–22); Surgeon-General of the British Armed Forces (2006–09); Director General Army Medical Services (2003–06)
- Conflicts: Gulf War
- Awards: Companion of the Order of the Bath; Member of the Order of the British Empire; Commander of the Order of St John; Mentioned in Despatches

Lieutenant General Louis Patrick Lillywhite, CB, MBE, QHS, FRCPGlas, FRCGP (born 23 February 1948) is a retired British Army physician and officer. He was Surgeon-General of the British Armed Forces from 2006 until December 2009. Between January 2017 and January 2022, he served as the first Master-General of the Army Medical Services

== Early life ==
Born to William Henry Lillywhite and Annie Kate (née Vesey), Louis Lillywhite attended King Edward VI School in Lichfield and the University of Wales College of Medicine and the London School of Hygiene & Tropical Medicine.

== Military career ==
Lillywhite was commissioned on 1 October 1968 as a second lieutenant (on probation). He was promoted to lieutenant on 7 July 1971 and to captain on 2 August 1972. He served as a medical officer and during the Gulf War in 1991, where he was mentioned in despatches. He was Surgeon-General of the British Armed Forces from 2006 until December 2009. He was appointed as an Officer of the Order of St John in 2007 and became an Honorary Member of the Society of Medical Consultants to the Armed Forces (of the USA) in 2009 and an Honorary Fellow of the Royal College of General Practitioners in 2010.

Lillywhite was appointed a Member of the Order of the British Empire in 1984, and a Companion of the Order of the Bath in the 2009 New Year Honours.

== Later life ==
In retirement, he became a member of the Bevan Commission (Wales), and a Senior Consulting Fellow at the Centre on Global Health Security of the Royal Institute of International Affairs, Chatham House. He was the Chief Medical Officer of St John Ambulance from 2010 – 2016, becoming a Commander of the Order of St John in 2016

He lives at Bratton, Wiltshire.

Military offices
Preceded by Vice Admiral Ian Jenkins	Surgeon General of the British Armed Forces; 2006–2009	Succeeded by Vice Admiral Philip Raffaelli
Preceded by Major General David Jolliffe	Director General Army Medical Services; 2003–2006	Succeeded by Major General Alan Hawley
