= General Skinner =

General Skinner may refer to:

- Bruce Skinner (1858–1932), British Army major general
- Robert J. Skinner (fl. 1980s–2020s), U.S. Air Force lieutenant general
- Thomson J. Skinner (1752–1809), Continental Army major general
- William Skinner (British Army officer) (1700–1780), British Army lieutenant general
- William Skinner (North Carolina general) (1728–1798), North Carolina Militia brigadier general in the American Revolutionary War

== See also ==
- Attorney General Skinner (disambiguation)
