= Robert Drew (British Army officer) =

Australian-born British army doctor

Lieutenant-General Sir Robert Drew KCB CBE FRCP FRCPE FRACP
- Drew in 1962
- Born: 4 October 1907
- Died: 27 July 1991 (aged 83)
- Allegiance: United Kingdom
- Branch: British Army
- Service years: 1931–1969
- Rank: Lieutenant-General
- Conflicts: World War II

Sir William Robert MacFarlane Drew (4 October 1907 – 27 July 1991) was an Australian-born British army doctor.

Born in Sydney, Drew entered the Royal Army Medical Corps in 1931 and, after five years of service in India, became a specialist in tropical diseases. He served in France and then as a professor at the Royal Army Medical College during the Second World War. After five years on secondment as a professor at the University of Baghdad (1946–51), he held various clinical and administrative positions in the British army, culminating in his appointment as Director-General Army Medical Services from 1965 to 1969 with the rank of lieutenant-general. Among various honours, he was knighted in 1965 and served as president of the Medical Society of London and of the Royal Society of Tropical Medicine and Hygiene.

== Early life ==
Drew was born in Sydney, Australia, on 4 October 1907, the son of William Hughes Drew and Ethel, née Macfarlane. He was educated at the University of Sydney, where he graduated with a BSc in 1929 and then his MBBS in 1930.

== Military career ==
Drew was commissioned into the Royal Army Medical Corps in 1931 as a lieutenant and was posted to India for five years from 1932. He was awarded MRCP status in 1938. He was then a tutor at the Postgraduate Medical School in Hammersmith and became a recognised specialist in tropical diseases. He served in France during the early stages of the Second World War, before serving in the Hatfield Military Hospital from 1941 and then assistant professor of tropical medicine at the Royal Army Medical College from 1942 to 1946.

After the war, he was seconded to the University of Baghdad as professor of medicine (1946 to 1951) and served as honorary physician to King Faisal II and to the prime minister. After a year at the Massachusetts General Hospital, in 1952 he returned to the UK and was appointed professor of tropical medicine at the Royal Army Medical College and a consultant at the Queen Alexandra Military Hospital. In 1955, he was appointed commander of the Cambridge Military Hospital. From 1957 to 1959, he was consulting physician to Middle East Land Forces in Cyprus, and was then (from 1959 to 1960) consulting physician to the Army and Director of Medicine at the Ministry of Defence. He was promoted to brigadier on 29 April 1959, and then to major-general on 14 January 1960 and served as Commandant of the Royal Army Medical College from 1960 to 1963, and then as Director of Medical Services to the British Army of the Rhine from 1963 to 1965. He was finally promoted to lieutenant-general on 3 May 1965 and served as Director-General Army Medical Services from 1965 to 1969; he retired on 26 July 1969.

== Later life and honours ==
Drew was appointed OBE in 1940 for his work at France in the early part of the Second World War. He was advanced to CBE in 1952. Appointed as a Companion of the Order of the Bath (CB) in 1962 was followed by promotion to Knight Commander (KCB) in 1965. He was also made a Knight of the Order of St John in 1977. He was fellow of the Royal College of Physicians, of the Royal College of Physicians of Edinburgh, and of the Royal Australasian College of Physicians. He was also an honorary fellow of the American College of Physicians and the Royal College of Surgeons. He was president of the Medical Society of London for 1967–68 and of the Royal Society of Tropical Medicine and Hygiene from 1971 to 1973.

Drew died on 27 July 1991. His wife, Dorothy Merle Daking-Smith, had predeceased him (in 1990), as had his daughter Joanna; his son Christopher, also a doctor, survived him.
