= General Carmichael =

General Carmichael may refer to:

- Ewan Carmichael (fl. 1980s–2010s), British Army major general
- Hugh Lyle Carmichael (1764–1813), British Army lieutenant general
- Richard H. Carmichael (1913–1983), U.S. Air Force major general
- Sir James Carmichael-Smyth, 1st Baronet (1779–1838), British Army major general
