= Attorney General Skinner =

Attorney General Skinner may refer to:

- Cortlandt Skinner (1727–1799), Royal Attorney General of New Jersey
- James John Skinner (1923–2008), Attorney General of Zambia

== See also ==
- General Skinner (disambiguation)
