= John Dowse (British Army officer) =

British Army general & Ireland international rugby union player

Major-General John Dowse CB CBE MC* CStJ
- Born: 11 November 1891
- Died: 16 August 1964 (aged 72)
- Military career
- Allegiance: United Kingdom
- Branch: British Army
- Service years: 1914–1949
- Rank: Major-General
- Commands: Royal Army Medical College; 11th General Hospital; Louise Margaret Hospital; Military Families Hospital Tidworth
- Conflicts: First World War; Second World War
- Awards: Companion of the Order of the Bath; Commander of the Order of the British Empire; Military Cross & Bar; Mentioned in Despatches; Grand Cross of the Royal Order of the Phoenix (Greece)

Rugby union career
- Position: Forward
Senior career
Years	Team	Apps	(Points)
- Monkstown
International career
Years	Team	Apps	(Points)
1914	Ireland	3	

Major-General John Cecil Alexander Dowse, CB, CBE, MC & Bar, CStJ (11 November 1891 – 16 August 1964) was an Irish-born British Army medical officer who served in the First and Second World Wars. He played rugby for Ireland in 1914.

== Biography ==
Dowse was born at Glenageary, County Dublin, where his father was rector of St Paul's Church. In 1894 the family moved to Monkstown where Dowse later played rugby for Monkstown Football Club. He was educated at Trent College, Derbyshire, and Trinity College Dublin.

In 1914 Dowse played rugby for Ireland against France, Scotland and Wales. However, his rugby career was cut short by the outbreak of the First World War and he was commissioned as a lieutenant in the Royal Army Medical Corps in August 1914. He served on the Western Front and in India, remained in the army after the war and served during the Second World War in France, North Africa, Italy and Egypt. He ended the war with the rank of acting major general (made substantive in November 1945). After the war he was Commandant and Director of Studies at the Royal Army Medical College from 1948 to 1949. He then retired and was colonel commandant of the RAMC (a ceremonial position) from 1950 to 1956.

Dowse was appointed a Commander of the Order of St John in 1947. The Greek government awarded him the Grand Cross of the Royal Order of the Phoenix in 1948.
