= Michael von Bertele =

Major General Michael von Bertele CB OBE FRCP
- Born: 23 August 1956 (age 70)
- Military career
- Allegiance: United Kingdom
- Branch: British Army
- Service years: 1976–2012
- Rank: Major General
- Service number: 502799
- Commands: Director General Army Medical Services (2009–12); Joint Medical Command (2008–09); Commander Medical 3rd (UK) Division (1996–98); British Medical Battalion, United Nations Protection Force (1993); 5th Field Ambulance (1992–93)
- Conflicts: Falklands War; Gulf War; United Nations Protection Force
- Awards: Companion of the Order of the Bath; Officer of the Order of the British Empire

Major General Michael James von Bertele, CB, OBE, FRCP (born 23 August 1956) is a retired senior British Army officer. From 2009 to 2012, he was director general of the Army Medical Services.

== Early life ==
Von Bertele was born on 23 August 1956. He is the son of Otto Bertele von Grenadenberg and his wife Monica von Bertele (née Barrett). He was educated at the all-boys St Mary's Grammar School, Darlington. He worked as a drayman for Schwechat Brewery in Vienna from 1974 to 1976. Married Frances Loudon, younger daughter of Dr and Mrs Joe Loudon in April 1985, two daughters born 1987 and 1989 and one son born 1992.

== Military career ==
On 24 September 1976, von Bertele was commissioned into the Royal Army Medical Corps as a second lieutenant (on probation) (Medical Cadetship). He was given the service number 502799. He went on to study medicine at the Welsh National School of Medicine in Cardiff, Wales. He graduated with Bachelor of Medicine, Bachelor of Surgery (MB BCh) in 1979. He was promoted to lieutenant (on probation) on 12 July 1979. He then underwent further medical training for a year as a Pre-registration house officer.

On 1 August 1980, his commission was confirmed and he was promoted to captain. Between 1980 and 1983, he was a Medical Officer in one of the Parachute Field Ambulance's. He was a member of a surgical team at Ajax Bay and was attached to the 3rd Battalion The Parachute Regiment for the assault on Mt Longdon during the Falklands War of 1982. In 1983, he began practising aviation medicine. He was promoted to major on 1 August 1985. He was awarded a Diploma in Aviation Medicine in 1986.

He was promoted to lieutenant colonel on 1 August 1992. He then became commanding officer of the 5th Field Ambulance. In the same year, he was awarded Membership of the Faculty of Occupational Medicine (MFOM). From April 1993 to November 1993, he commanded the British Medical Battalion of the United Nations Protection Force in the former Republic of Yugoslavia. Between 1996 and 1998, he was the Commander Medical 3rd (UK) Division.

In 2000, he graduated from the Royal College of Defence Studies. He was promoted to colonel on 1 August 2000. From 2001 to 2003, he was colonel of employment policy (army). He was promoted to brigadier on 5 December 2003. He then joined the Ministry of Defence as Director of Medical Operational Capability from 2004 to 2006. On 2 October 2006, he was promoted to major general and appointed chief executive of the Defence Medical Education and Training Agency. He was appointed commander joint medical command in 2008. In 2009, he was appointed director general Army Medical Services.

He retired from the British Army on 25 December 2012 and was then appointed to the Reserve of Officers.

== Later life ==
Following his retirement from the British Army, von Bertele joined Picker Institute Europe as Chief executive. It is a 'not-for-profit organisation that makes patients' views count in healthcare'. He resigned from the company in March 2013. From 2013 he served as Humanitarian Director for Save the Children International.

In 2015, World Health Organization Director General Margaret Chan appointed von Bertele as member of the Advisory Group on Reform of WHO's Work in Outbreaks and Emergencies with Health and Humanitarian Consequences.

== Honours and decorations ==
On 26 April 1994, von Bertele was appointed Officer of the Order of the British Empire (OBE) "in recognition of distinguished services in the former Republic of Yugoslavia during the period April 1993 to November 1993". He was appointed Honorary Surgeon to The Queen (QHS) on 10 March 2008. In the 2012 Birthday Honours, he was appointed Companion of the Order of the Bath (CB). In 2013 he was elected Fellow of the Royal College of Physicians FRCP.

Military offices
Preceded by Major General Alan Hawley	Director General Army Medical Services; 2009–2012	Succeeded by Major General Ewan Carmichael
