= Ralph Ainsworth =

British medical officer (1875–1952)

Major-General Sir Ralph Ainsworth CB DSO OBE KStJ
- Ainsworth in the 1930s
- Born: Ralph Bignell Ainsworth; 20 September 1875
- Died: 27 January 1952 (aged 76)

Major-General Sir Ralph Bignell Ainsworth, CB, DSO, OBE, KStJ (20 September 1875 – 27 January 1952) was a British physician, surgeon, and British Army officer. From 1930 to 1935, he was Commandant of the Royal Army Medical College. During World War II, he served as Director of Medical Services of the Joint War Organisation (formed by the British Red Cross Society and the Order of St John).

== Military career ==
Ainsworth began his military career in the Royal Navy. On 26 February 1900, he was appointed a surgeon in the Navy Medical Service. In 1902, he transferred to the Royal Army Medical Corps, British Army, where he was appointed lieutenant on probation on 1 September 1902.

== Honours and decorations ==
On 1 January 1916, Ainsworth was appointed a Companion of the Distinguished Service Order (DSO) "for distinguished service in the Field". In January 1919, he was awarded the Médaille des Épidémies (en Vermeil) by the President of the French Republic "for distinguished services rendered during the course of the campaign".

In the 1923 King's Birthday Honours, Ainsworth was appointed an Officer of the Order of the British Empire (OBE). In June 1934, he was appointed an Officer of the Venerable Order of St John (OStJ). In the 1935 King's Birthday Honours, he was appointed a Companion of the Order of the Bath (CB) in recognition of his service as Commandant of the Royal Army Medical College. In December 1941, he was promoted to Commander of the Venerable Order of St John (CStJ).

In the 1946 New Year Honours, Ainsworth was appointed a Knight Bachelor (Kt) in recognition of his role as Director of Medical Services of the Joint War Organization. On 12 March 1946, he was knighted by King George VI during a ceremony at Buckingham Palace. On 23 December 1946, he was promoted to Knight of the Venerable Order of St John (KStJ).

== Personal life ==
He married Florence, only daughter of the late Imre Kiralfi of Washington Square, New York, and they had two daughters.
