= Ida Greaves =

Australian nurse (1875 – 1954)

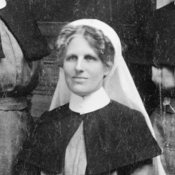
- Lady Dudley's matron in France – Ida Greaves, in 1914
- Born: 1875; Newcastle, New South Wales
- Died: 1954 (aged 78–79); Chatswood, New South Wales
- Education: Newcastle Hospital
- Occupation: nurse
- Known for: matron of the Australian Voluntary Hospital

Ida Greaves RRC (1875 – 1954) was the Australian Matron of the Australian Voluntary Hospital in WWI who became a member of the Royal Red Cross.

== Life ==
Greaves was born in Newcastle in 1875. She trained to be a nurse at the Newcastle Hospital from 1901 to 1904. She left nursing in Australia in 1910 to work as a nurse in Britain.

In 1914 Rachel Ward, Countess of Dudley, who was the estranged wife of a former governor-general of Australia, completed her discussions with the King and Lord Kitchener. She had noticed that there were a large number of Australian doctors and nurses in Britain and war had been declared. She proposed to create a new hospital staffed by Australians. Her idea was accepted by the British Army and Australia made the official offer on 15 August and two days later advertisements appeared in the British press. Female Australian nurses and male Australian doctors could apply.

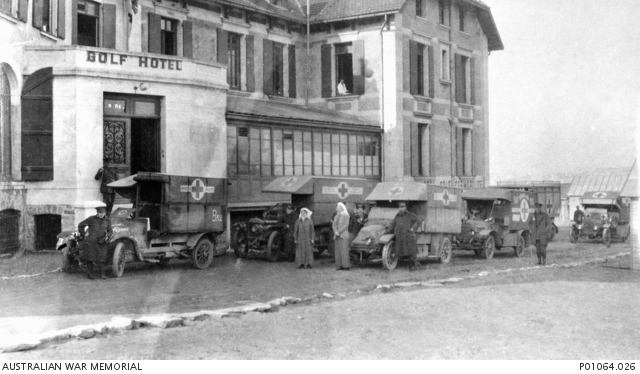
Donated Ambulances outside the Australian Voluntary Hospital in Wimereux.

Greaves became the hospital's matron and there were 36 nurses and, in time, a staff of 120. One of the nurses was Ida's sister Susie. The new hospital's staff left for France before the end of August. They were the only Australians on the Western Front until April 1916. By that time Greaves had already received a Royal Red Cross in recognition of her work. This was an award only given to women and she and Nora Kathleen Fletcher were the first Australians, during the war, to receive this award.

Greaves and the other staff had arrived at Le Havre on a private yacht and the hospital was assembled at St Nazaire. It was moved to Wimereau by the end of October. It was to find its permanent home at the Hotel Golf in Wimereux. The nurses slept in tents until a house was found for them.

Greaves later worked at the British General Hospital 12 in Rouen. When she returned to Australia she was lauded as one of the longest serving Australians in uniform during the first world war. She was called "the senior war nurse" and she helped raise funds for returned veterans. She opened a private hospital which they named Iluka in her home city of Newcastle.

Greaves died in the Sydney suburb of Chatswood in 1954. In 2021 her biography, Matron Ida Greaves – 'a Right Daughter of Australia', was published.
