= Joseph Crowdy =

British soldier and military doctor

Major-General Joseph Porter Crowdy CB QHP FRIPH (19 November 1923 – 28 June 2009) was a British soldier and military doctor, and Commandant of the Royal Army Medical College.

He was an Honorary Physician to H. M. the Queen, 1981–1984.

== Background and education ==
The son of Lieutenant-Colonel Charles R. Crowdy, by his marriage to Kate Porter, Joseph Porter Crowdy was educated at Gresham's School, Holt, Norfolk (1933–1942), and the University of Edinburgh (1942–1947). He took the degrees of MB and BCh in 1947, a Diploma in Tropical Medicine & Hygiene in 1956, and finally in 1957 Diplomas in Public Health and in Industrial Health.

== Career ==
Crowdy was a house surgeon at the Norfolk and Norwich Hospital from 1947 to 1948, before joining the Royal Army Medical Corps in 1949. He served in North Africa (1952–1955), then in Singapore (1960–1962), and in 1963 was appointed as Head of Applied Physiology at the Army Personnel Research Establishment, where he remained until in 1973 he became Professor of Army Health at the Royal Army Medical College. He was next Senior Medical Officer, Land Forces Cyprus (1976–1978), then Director of Army Preventative (Medicine 1978–1981) before his final posting as Commandant of the Royal Army Medical College (1985–1988).

== Publications ==
- Editor, Royal Army Medical Corps Journal, 1978–1983

== Family ==
In 1948, Crowdy married Beryl Elisabeth Sapsford (died 1997); they had four daughters.

== Honours and appointments ==
- Fellow of the Faculty of Public Health Medicine, 1974
- Member, Faculty of Occupational Medicine, 1981
- Fellow, Royal Institute of Public Health, 1982
- Honorary Physician to the Queen, 1981–1984
- Companion of the Order of the Bath, 1984
