= Brian Mayes (British Army officer) =

British Army officer (1934–2019)

Major General Brian Mayes CB CStJ FRCS
- Born: 24 August 1934
- Died: 19 December 2019
- Military career
- Allegiance: United Kingdom
- Branch: British Army
- Service years: 1960–1996
- Rank: Major General
- Service number: 464204
- Commands: Director General Army Medical Services
- Awards: Commander of the Venerable Order of Saint John (CStJ); Companion of the Order of the Bath (CB)

Major General Frederick Brian Mayes CB CStJ FRCS (24 August 1934 – 19 December 2019) was a senior British Army officer. He was director general of the Army Medical Services from 1993 to 1996.

== Early life ==
Mayes was born on 24 August 1934 to Harry Frederick Mayes and Constance Enid Mayes. He was educated at Wyggeston Grammar School, Leicester from 1945 to 1952. He studied at St Mary's Hospital Medical School, graduating with a Bachelor of Medicine, Bachelor of Surgery (MB BS) in 1958.

== Military career ==
On 1 February 1960, as part of National Service, Mayes was commissioned into Royal Army Medical Corps as a lieutenant. He was given the service number 464204. On 9 March 1960, he transferred to a short service commission in the regular army. He maintained the rank of lieutenant and was given seniority from 14 December 1959. He was promoted to captain on 14 December 1960. He transferred to a regular commission on 4 March 1964, with seniority in the rank of captain from 14 December 1959. He was promoted to major on 14 December 1964. During his early career, he served in Aden, most likely during the Aden Emergency of 1963 to 1967, in East Africa, in West Germany with the British Army of the Rhine and in the United Kingdom.

On 14 December 1972, he was promoted to lieutenant colonel. In the same year, he was made a consultant in surgery. He was promoted to colonel on 14 December 1982. From 1984 to 1987, he was commanding officer of the British Military Hospital in Hannover. From 1987 to 1988, he was commanding officer of Cambridge Military Hospital, Aldershot Garrison. He was promoted to brigadier on 19 December 1988. He was then once more posted to West Germany as a consultant surgeon attached to HQ BAOR in 1988. He was promoted to major general on 31 December 1990. He was Commander Medical, HQ BAOR from 1990 to 1993. He served as Director General Army Medical Services from 1993 to 1996.

He retired from the British Army on 26 May 1996.

== Later life ==
In retirement, Mayes lived in the town of Farnham, Surrey. He died on 19 December 2019 at the age of 85.

== Personal life ==
In 1962, Mayes married Mary Anna Georgina Roche. Together they had two sons and two daughters. One of their two sons pre-deceased his parents.

== Honours and decorations ==
On 31 December 1990, Mayes was appointed Honorary Surgeon to the Queen (QHS). His tenure expired on 1 April 1996. He was appointed Commander of the Venerable Order of Saint John (CStJ) in December 1993. In the 1995 Queen's Birthday Honours, he was appointed Companion of the Order of the Bath (CB).
