= Anthony Shaw (British Army officer) =

British general (1930–2015)

Major-General Anthony John Shaw CB CBE CStJ FRCP (13 July 1930 – 27 July 2015) was a senior British Army officer, who was Director General of the Army Medical Services from 1988 to 1990.

== Early life ==
Shaw was born on 13 July 1930 to Lieutenant Colonel W. A. Shaw, MC and Mrs E. Shaw (née Malley). Between 1943 and 1948, he was educated at Epsom College, a public school in Epsom, Surrey. He was a member of the school's Rugby XV and Hockey XI. He was also won the Smith-Pearse Botany Prize. He went up to Gonville and Caius College, Cambridge in 1950; earning a Bachelor of Arts (BA), later promoted to Master of Arts (MA). Having studied at Westminster Hospital Medical School, he qualified MRCS, LRCP in 1954. He graduated Bachelor of Medicine, Bachelor of Surgery (MB BCh) from the University of Cambridge in 1955. He undertook his two pre-registration house officer placements at Westminster Hospital as a casualty officer and at Kingston Hospital as a house surgeon and obstetrics house officer.

== Military career ==
On 7 August 1956, as part of national service, Shaw was commissioned into the Royal Army Medical Corps of the British Army as a lieutenant. He was given the service number 449523. He transferred from the national service list to short service commission in the regular army on 29 August 1956 and was given seniority in the rank of lieutenant from 9 February 1956. He was promoted to captain on 9 February 1957. He transferred to a regular commission as a lieutenant on 25 June 1959 with seniority from 9 February 1956. On the same date he was promoted once more to captain with seniority from 9 February 1957. He was promoted major on 1 April 1962. He attended Staff College, Camberley in 1963. During his early career, he was posted to Malta, Berlin, Malaya, and Nepal.

He was promoted to lieutenant colonel on 9 February 1969. He served as commanding officer of 28 Field Ambulance from 1969 to 1970, and was chief instructor at the RAMC Training Centre from 1970 to 1972. He attended the National Defence College in 1973. From 1973 to 1976, he was posted to the Ministry of Defence as Assistant Director General of Medical Services. From 1977 to 1979, he was commanding officer of Cambridge Military Hospital. Already an acting colonel, he was promoted to colonel on 9 August 1978. He was Commander Medical, 2nd Infantry Division, BAOR between 1979 and 1981.

He was promoted to brigadier, equivalent to a one-star general on 29 September 1981. He was Commander Medical, South Eastern District of England in 1981. From 1981 to 1983, he was once more posted to the MOD as Director of Medical Supply. He served as Deputy Director General of Army Medical Services from 1983 to 1984. He was appointed Director of Army Community and Occupational Medicine in 1983, holding the post until 1987. In 1984, he was appointed Commander of Medical Services, United Kingdom Land Forces. He was promoted to major general on 28 January 1985 with seniority from 3 December 1984. He served as Director General of the Army Medical Services from 1988 to 1990.

He retired from the British Army on 11 May 1991.

== Later life ==
Shaw continued his medical career after his military career and served as President of the Standing Medical Board, Aldershot, between 1995 and 2005.

After years of ill health, he died on 27 July 2015 at Frimley Park Hospital, Frimley, Surrey. He was 85.

== Personal life ==
In 1961, Shaw married Gillian Best. Together they have one son and one daughter.

== Honours and decorations ==
Shaw was appointed Honorary Physician to the Queen (QHP) on 11 August 1983. He was succeeded on 25 February 1991. In the 1985 Queen's Birthday Honours, he was appointed Commander of the Order of the British Empire (CBE). In the 1988 Queen's Birthday Honours, he was appointed Companion of the Order of the Bath (CB).
