= William MacArthur (British Army officer) =

Lieutenant-General Sir William MacArthur KCB DSO OBE FRCP FRCPI
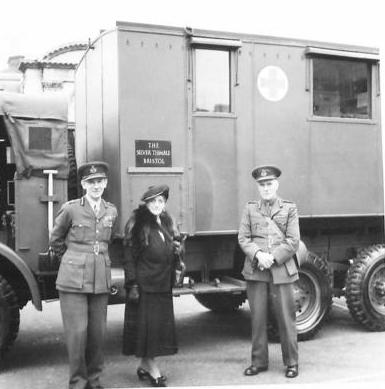
- MacArthur (right) in 1941
- Born: 11 March 1884; Belfast, Ireland
- Died: 30 July 1964 (aged 80)
- Military career
- Allegiance: United Kingdom
- Branch: British Army
- Service years: 1909–1941
- Rank: Lieutenant-General
- Unit: Royal Army Medical Corps
- Commands: Director General Army Medical Services (1938–41); Royal Army Medical College (1935–38)
- Conflicts: First World War; Second World War
- Awards: Knight Commander of the Order of the Bath; Distinguished Service Order; Officer of the Order of the British Empire; Mentioned in Despatches

Lieutenant-General Sir William Porter MacArthur, KCB, DSO, OBE, FRCP, FRCPI (11 March 1884 – 30 July 1964) was an Irish-born British Army officer and medical doctor. He served as Commandant of the Royal Army Medical College from 1935 to 1938, and Director General Army Medical Services from 1938 to 1941. His specialism as a medical doctor was tropical medicine and he served as president of the Royal Society of Tropical Medicine and Hygiene from 1959 to 1961.

== Early life ==
The son of John Porter MacArthur and Margaret Rainey MacArthur (née Baird), MacArthur was born on 11 March 1884, in Belmont, Belfast. He attended Bangor Grammar School and studied medicine at Queen's College, Belfast. He graduated as a Bachelor of Medicine, Bachelor of Surgery from the Royal University of Ireland in 1908 and began his year of house officer rotations at the Royal Victoria Hospital.

As a child, MacArthur showed a keen interest in the Irish language, using family visits to Cloughaneely, Marble Hill and Tory Island to learn from the native speakers. He became a fluent speaker and attended the Belfast Feis of 1902. In 1906, while at Queen's College, he became a founding member and first president of the Queen's College Gaelic Society. He retained a close connection with the society throughout his life and was the guest of honour at the society's golden jubilee in 1956.

== Military career ==
In January 1909, MacArthur was commissioned into the Royal Army Medical Corps, British Army as a lieutenant on probation. He was confirmed as a lieutenant in July 1910 and earned a diploma in public health at the University of Oxford in the same year. In 1911, MacArthur completed his Doctor of Medicine degree and he was posted to Mauritius as a specialist sanitary officer. This posting gave him hands-on experience of tropical medicine, a field of work he would come to specialise in. He was promoted to captain on 30 July 1912 and became a Fellow of the Royal College of Physicians of Ireland in 1913.

MacArthur returned to the United Kingdom with the outbreak of the First World War in 1914. From 1915 he served on the Western Front until he received a stomach wound in the Battle of the Somme and returned home in 1916. He did not return to front line service. Towards the end of the war, he worked to establish the Army School of Hygiene in Blackpool, where he served as the first commanding officer and chief instructor from 1919 to 1922. During this time he continued his own studies at the London School of Tropical Medicine, earning a Diploma in Tropical Medicine and Hygiene in 1920.

MacArthur served as Professor of Tropical Medicine at the Royal Army Medical College in two periods from 1922 to 1929 and from 1932 to 1934. On leaving the college in 1929 he was appointed consulting physician to the army, a role in which he continued alongside his college duties until September 1934. On 16 September he became Deputy Director General of the Army Medical Services for a year before returning to the college as commandant and Director of Studies from 26 September 1935 to February 1938.

On 1 March 1938 MacArthur was simultaneously promoted to lieutenant-general and appointed Director General, Army Medical Services a role in which he served until 1941. This placed him as the head of all the British Army medical units for the first years of the Second World War. With tensions rising in Europe, MacArthur recognised that the medical service was unprepared for conflict and ordered the stock piling of medical equipment in 1938. This earned him a reprimand from a parliamentary committee for breaching instructions on managing his budget, but his foresight was recognised with the outbreak of war the following year.

MacArthur struggled with the demands of administering such a complex organisation in war time and retired from active service with ill health in 1941.

Following the war he served as Colonel Commandant of the Royal Army Medical Corps from 1946 to 1951.

== Personal life ==
While stationed in Mauritius, MacArthur married Eugenie Therese Antelme in 1914. They had two sons; the youngest of which was Ian MacArthur, a Conservative politician and Member of Parliament.

== Honours and decorations ==
For his service on the Western Front, MacArthur was mentioned in despatches in November 1915 and made a Companion of the Distinguished Service Order on 1 January 1916. Following the war, he was made an Officer of the Order of the British Empire (OBE) on 3 June 1919. In the 1938 New Year Honours, MacArthur was appointed Companion of the Order of the Bath (CB). In the 1939 King's Birthday Honours, he was promoted to Knight Commander of the Order of the Bath (KCB).

MacArthur was awarded honorary Doctorates of Science from both Queen's University Belfast in 1935 and University of Oxford in 1949.

== Bibliography ==
- Smart, Nick (2005). Biographical Dictionary of British Generals of the Second World War. Barnesley: Pen & Sword. ISBN 1844150496.
