= Rosa Angela Kirkcaldie =

Australian hospital matron, writer and army nurse

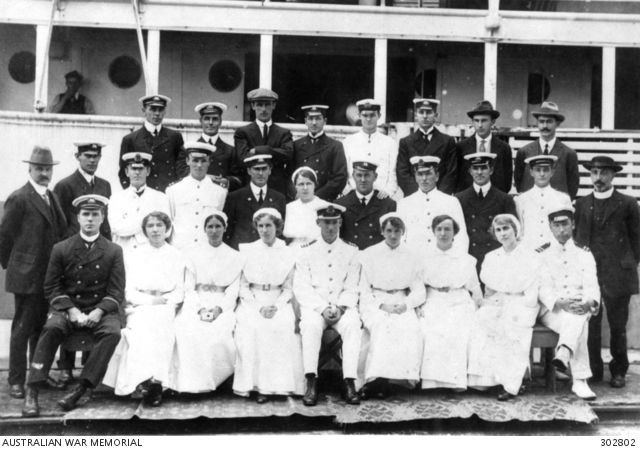
- Born: 3 June 1887; Homebush
- Died: 4 August 1972 (aged 85); Collaroy
- Known for: war service and celebrated matron

Rosa Angela Kirkcaldie CBE (3 June 1887 – 4 August 1972) was an Australian hospital matron, writer and army nurse. She served as a nurse throughout the first world war and then became a celebrated matron at the Royal Alexandra Hospital for Children.

== Life ==
Kirkcaldie was born in New South Wales at Homebush in 1887. Her mother, Alice Angela Kirkcaldie (born Mountain) had been born in England and her father, David Kirkcaldie, was born in Scotland. Her father was a railway commissioner earning about £1,000 per year. He died in 1909.

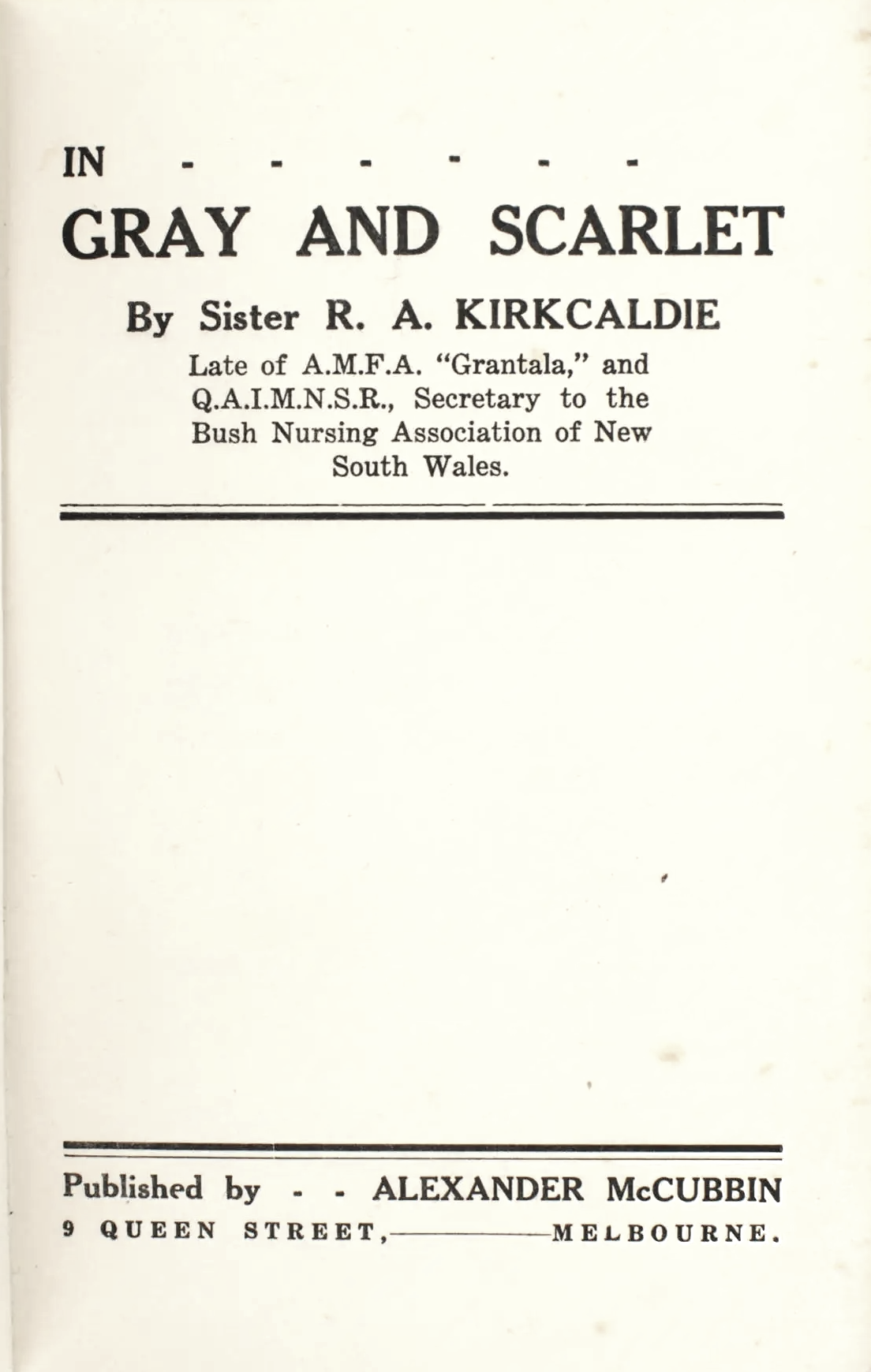
Rosa Angela Kirkcaldie's 1922 book

She trained as a nurse from 1910 to 1914 at the Royal Prince Alfred Hospital and when war was declared she was keen to volunteer. (Her elder sister, Katherine Vida Kirkcaldie, volunteered for overseas service with the Australian Army Nursing Service in the 1914–18 War.) She resigned from the hospital and she joined the staff of HMAS Grantala which was Australia's only and short-lived hospital ship of the First World War. On 30 August 1914 she and Grantala left Sydney to support the Australian Naval and Military Expeditionary Force in Rabaul in German New Guinea. The ship was given battle honours but was too small to be effective, so was returned to its owners. Kirkcaldie went to Britain where she enrolled in the Queen Alexandra's Imperial Military Nursing Service Reserve in May 1915 and she was soon in Malta serving at a hospital in Valetta dealing with dirty and frostbitten casualties from the Gallipoli campaign.

In 1922 she published her account of her war service In Grey and Scarlet and she became the secretary of the New South Wales Bush Nursing Association. She was replaced by Nellie Morrice in 1924 when she resigned to become the "celebrated" matron of the Royal Alexandra Hospital for Children in Camperdown. She was dedicated and encouraged others to excel by her own example.

In 1932 she was the President of the Australasian Trained Nurses' Association. She retired in 1945.

Kirkcaldie died in the Sydney suburb of Collaroy in 1972. She never married.

== Recognition ==
Kirkcaldie House, the nurses' quarters attached to the Royal Alexandra Hospital for Children, Camperdown, and built in 1941, was named for her. Her portrait, by Norman Carter, hung in the foyer.

Kirkcaldie Circuit, in the Canberra suburb of Chisholm, is named in her honour.
