= Elsie Jane Whicker =

British Australian bush-nursing superintendent

- Born: 16 January 1899; Hendon, Middlesex, England
- Died: 24 January 1987 (aged 88); Eastwood, New South Wales, Australia
- Occupation: nurse
- Employer: New South Wales Bush Nursing Association

Elsie Jane Whicker MBE (16 January 1899 – 24 January 1987) was a British Australian bush-nursing superintendent of the New South Wales Bush Nursing Association.

== Life ==
Whicker was born in England at Hendon in 1899. Her mother was Frances Ellen (born Jones) and her father was a joiner named John Henwood. After she married she and her husband Charles Edward Whicker emigrated to Australia. She and Charles had a divorce in 1926 and she trained to become a nurse.

In 1953 there were 31 different centres of the New South Wales Bush Nursing Association with headquarters in Sydney. The organisation had been founded forty years before to supply nursing in remote areas. Whicker was based at the HQ as the new superintendent. She travelled a lot to visit the diaspora of centres and she kept and enjoyed a detailed correspondence with each of the nurses. They would tell her of their progress and problems and she was also told of local social events. The bush nurses enjoyed a good degree of self-management but their job could also be lonely. Whicker's contribution was to give them support and this was recognised in 1960 when she became a Member of the Order of the British Empire (MBE). She had kept a high profile, for example when she was given a few months vacation in 1959 she used it to attend conferences and nursing facilities in the UK, Scandinavia and Canada. She had contacts internationally as she was a member of the British-based Royal College of Nursing. She had been at the International Nursing Congress in Melbourne in 1955 and the Pan-Pacific Rehabilitation Conference in Sydney in 1958 on behalf of the association.

== Death and legacy ==
The New South Wales Bush Nursing Association had just 16 centres in 1972 and it was wound up in 1975 as its centres were taken over by the Health Department. Whicker died in 1987 in the Sydney suburb of Eastwood.

== Sources ==
- Russell, Ruth Lynette; Cornell, Judith A. (2012). A Vision for the Bush: The NSW Bush Nursing Association 1911-1974. Australian College of Nursing. ISBN 978-1-921375-51-4. Reviewed in: Borsay, Anne; Dietz, Susanne Malchau; Lissauer Cromwell, Judith; Birn, Anne-Emanuell; Bates, Christina; D’Antonio, Patricia; Jones, Marion Moser; Russell, R. Lynette; Sorenson Marshall, Elaine Shaw; Fell, Alison S.; Foth, Thomas; Lineberry, Cate; Digby, Anne; Grypma, Sonya; Drees, Laurie Meijer; Duffy, Mignon; Hunter, Billie; Brown, Theodore M.; Fairman, Julie A.; Whelan, Jean C.; Cornell, Judith A.; Hallett, Christine E.; Phillips, Howard; Deacon, Harriet; Thomson, Kirsten (2015). "Book Reviews". Nursing History Review. 23 (1): 139–174. doi:10.1891/1062-8061.23.139.
