= Alan Reay (British Army officer) =

British Army general (1925-2012)

Lieutenant-General Sir Alan Reay KBE CStJ FRCP
- Born: Hubert Alan John Reay; 19 March 1925; Hednesford, Staffordshire, England
- Died: 4 February 2012 (aged 86)
- Burial place: East Sheen Cemetery
- Military career
- Allegiance: United Kingdom
- Branch: British Army
- Service years: 1949–1985
- Rank: Lieutenant-General
- Service number: 406929
- Unit: Royal Army Medical Corps

Lieutenant-General Sir Hubert Alan John Reay, KBE, CStJ, FRCP (19 March 1925 – 4 February 2012) was a senior British Army officer. He served as Director General Army Medical Services between 1981 and 1984.

== Early life ==
Reay was born on 19 March 1925 in Hednesford, Staffordshire. His father, a chaplain, had been awarded the Military Cross during World War I. He was educated at Lancing College, then an all-boys public school in the village of Lancing, West Sussex. He studied medicine at the University of Edinburgh, graduating in 1948 with Bachelor of Medicine, Bachelor of Surgery (MB ChB) degrees.

== Military career ==
On 23 October 1949, as part of national service, Reay was commissioned into the Royal Army Medical Corps with the rank of lieutenant. He was promoted to captain on 23 October 1950. On 23 November 1949, he transferred from the National Service List to the regular army on a short service commission. His first posting was as a Regimental Medical Officer attached to 1st Battalion, The Devonshire Regiment in the Federation of Malaya during the Malayan Emergency. By April 1952, he was a temporary major. He transferred to a regular commission on 26 November 1952 in the rank of captain. He was promoted to substantive major on 23 October 1957. He was promoted to lieutenant colonel on 23 October 1962.

He was promoted to colonel on 23 October 1972. He was promoted to brigadier on 14 July 1976. On 4 July 1977, he was appointed Commandant and Postgraduate Dean of the Royal Army Medical College and was granted the local rank of major general. He was promoted to substantive major general on 1 August 1977. In 1979, he was appointed Director of Medical Services BAOR. He was promoted to lieutenant general on 7 April 1981 with seniority from 7 November 1980. He served as Director General Army Medical Services from 1981 to 1984.

He retired from the British Army on 25 February 1985.

== Later life ==
Reay served as chairman of Lambeth health care NHS trust between 1992 and 1997.

He died on 4 February 2012, aged 86. His funeral was held at St Mary's Church, Barnes, London on 24 February. He was buried at East Sheen Cemetery.

== Personal life ==
In 1960, Reay married Ferelith Deane. Together they had three sons and two daughters. One of their sons predeceased him. Lady Reay died on 16 December 2016.

== Honours and decorations ==
On 4 April 1952, it was gazetted that Reay had been Mentioned in Despatches "in recognition of gallant and distinguished services in Malaya, during the period 1st July to 31st December, 1951".

He was appointed Officer of the Venerable Order of Saint John (OStJ) in December 1980, and promoted to Commander of the Venerable Order of Saint John (CStJ) in May 1981. In the 1981 Birthday Honours, he was appointed Knight Commander of the Order of the British Empire (KBE).

Having been appointed Honorary Physician to the Queen (QHP) on 3 January 1976, he was succeeded in the appointment on 25 February 1985. On 5 May 1986, he was appointed Honorary Colonel of the 217 (London) General Hospital Royal Army Medical Corps (Volunteers), a Territorial Army unit. His tenure expired on 19 March 1990.
