= Alan Hawley (British Army officer) =

British doctor and academic

Major General Alan Hawley CBE
- Military career
- Allegiance: United Kingdom
- Branch: British Army
- Service years: 1977–2009
- Rank: Major General
- Service number: 504232
- Commands: Director General Army Medical Services
- Awards: Commander of the Order of the British Empire

Major General Alan Hawley CBE is a British doctor and academic. He was a medical officer in the British Army and served as Director General of the Army Medical Services from 2006 to 2009. He is currently Professor of Disaster Management at the University of Glamorgan.

== Early life ==
Hawley studied at the University of Birmingham having attended Wednesfield Grammar School He graduated Bachelor of Medicine, Bachelor of Surgery (MB ChB). He completed his pre-registration house officer appointments at the Cambridge Military Hospital, Aldershot Garrison.

== Military career ==
On 3 April 1977, Hawley was commissioned into the Territorial and Army Volunteer Reserve of the Prince of Wales' Division, British Army as a second lieutenant (on probation). He was given the service number 504232. He transferred to the Royal Army Medical Corps on 4 June 1978 as a second lieutenant (on probation) (medical cadetship).

Military offices
Preceded by Major General Louis Lillywhite	Director General Army Medical Services; 2006–2009	Succeeded by Major General Michael von Bertele
