= Norman Talbot =

British obstetrician (1914–1979)

Lieutenant-General Sir Norman Talbot KBE TD FRCOG FRCP
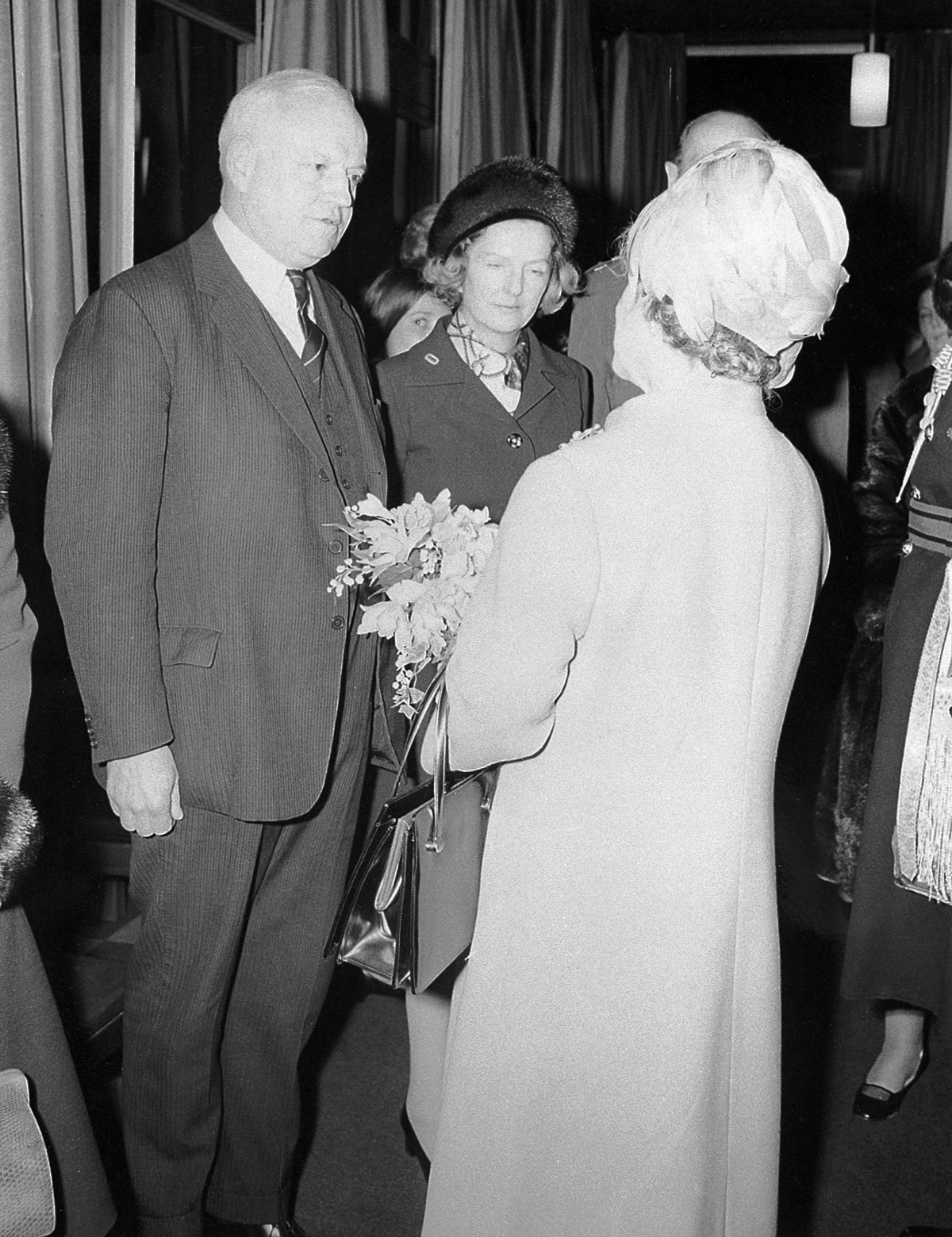
- Born: 16 February 1914
- Died: 27 February 1979 (aged 65)
- Military career
- Allegiance: United Kingdom
- Branch: British Army
- Service years: 1938–1973
- Rank: Lieutenant-General
- Conflicts: World War II
- Awards: Knight Commander of the Order of the Bath; Territorial Decoration; Mentioned in Dispatches (2)

Lieutenant-General Sir Norman Graham Guy Talbot, KBE, TD, FRCOG, FRCP (16 February 1914 – 27 February 1979) was a senior British Army officer who was director general of the Army Medical Services between 1969 and 1973.

== Early life ==
Talbot was born on 16 February 1914 in Hastings, Sussex, England. His parents were the Reverend Richard Talbot and Ethel Maude Talbot (née Stuart). He was educated at Reigate Grammar School, a private day school in Reigate, Surrey. In 1932, he began studying medicine at King's College Hospital Medical School. He qualified MRCS, LRCP in 1937 and received his Bachelor of Medicine, Bachelor of Surgery (MB BS) in 1938.

== Military career ==
Talbot was commissioned into the Royal Army Medical Corps, Territorial Army, on 1 November 1938 as a lieutenant. During his pre-registration year, he spent the first six months as a house anaesthetist and the latter six as a house obstetrician. These appointments were undertaken at King's College Hospital. In 1939, he was awarded the Diploma of Anaesthesiology (DA) by the Royal College of Anaesthetists. He was then appointed Regimental Medical Officer to the Finsbury Rifles.

With the outbreak of World War II, he would see active service. He transferred to the regular Royal Army Medical Corps on a short service commission as a lieutenant on 24 August 1939. He served in France with the British Expeditionary Force between September 1939 and May 1940 as a specialist anaesthetist. He was promoted to captain on 24 August 1940. From 1941 to 1943, he served in the Middle East as a specialist anaesthetist in different field medical units; specifically in Egypt, Palestine and Syria. As part of the Eighth Army he took part in the 1943 Allied invasion of Sicily and Allied invasion of Italy. By August 1944, he was a temporary major. He was appointed to a permanent commission on 24 August 1944.

From 1944 to early 1945, he was commandant of the British Increment to the Medical Mission to the National Liberation Army in Yugoslavia and officer commanding Gruno Military Hospital. By April 1945, he was an acting lieutenant colonel. In 1945, he was commanding officer of a hospital for German prisoners of war and in 1946, commanding officer of No 45 General Hospital in Italy. His next appointment was as assistant director of medical services of the Central Mediterranean Force based in Italy, from 1946 to 1947. He was promoted to major on 24 August 1947. He was then made commanding officer of No 154 General Hospital also in Italy.

In 1948, he returned to the United Kingdom, having been appointed deputy assistant director of medical services for the Home Counties of southern England. He received the Diploma in Obstetrics in 1950 and Membership of the Royal College of Obstetricians and Gynaecologists (MRGOG) the following year. In 1951, he was appointed commanding officer of Louise Margaret Maternity Hospital at the army base of Aldershot. At the same time, he was appointed consultant adviser in Obstetrics and Gynaecology to the British Army He achieved his Doctor of Medicine (MD) in 1953. He was promoted to lieutenant colonel on 16 April 1956. In December 1958, he travelled to Malta to take up the post of consultant obstetrician and gynaecologist at the David Bruce Military Hospital, Mtarfa. He was elected a Fellow of the Royal College of Obstetricians and Gynaecologists (FRCOG) in 1960.

Between 1961 and 1963, he served in West Germany with the British Army of the Rhine. On 24 August 1962, he was promoted to colonel. He was promoted to brigadier on 1 July 1967. On 14 April 1968, he was appointed commandant and director of studies at the Royal Army Medical College and was granted the acting rank of major general. He was promoted to major general on 22 August 1968. On 6 March 1969, he relinquished the appointment of commandant and director of studies. On 5 April 1969, he was appointed director general of the Army Medical Services and granted the acting rank of lieutenant general. He was promoted to lieutenant general on 26 July 1969. He was a Commissioner of the Royal Hospital Chelsea between 1969 and 1973.

He retired from the British Army on 22 November 1973.

== Later life ==
Following his retirement from the military, Talbot became medical director of the Margaret Pyke Centre. He held the position until 1978.

He died on 27 February 1979.

== Personal life ==
In 1939, Talbot married Laura Winifred Kilby. Together they had two sons and one daughter.

== Honours and decorations ==
On 24 August 1944, it was gazetted that Talbot had been Mentioned in Despatches "in recognition of gallant and distinguished services in Italy". On 11 January 1945, it was gazetted that he had also been Mentioned in Despatches "in recognition of gallant and distinguished services in Italy". He was awarded the Efficiency Medal (Territorial) on 12 August 1947. He was awarded the Territorial Efficiency Decoration (TD) on 20 June 1950. On 21 September 1951, his Efficiency Medal (Territorial) was cancelled having been awarded the Territorial Efficiency Decoration.

He was appointed Officer of the Order of the British Empire (OBE) on 19 April 1945 "in recognition of gallant and distinguished services in Italy". He was promoted to Knight Commander of the Order of the British Empire (KBE) in the 1969 Queen's Birthday Honours.
