= William Macpherson (British Army officer) =

British medical corps officer (1858–1927)

Major-General Sir William Macpherson KCMG CB
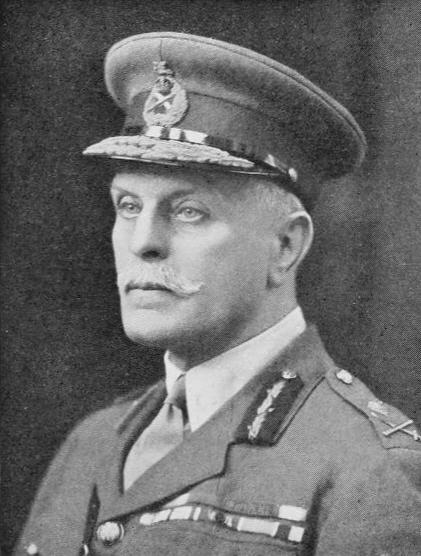
- Born: 27 January 1858; Manse of Kilmuir Easter, Scotland
- Died: 15 October 1927 (aged 69) London, England
- Branch: Royal Army Medical Corps
- Education: University of Edinburgh

Major-General Sir William Grant Macpherson, KCMG, CB (27 January 1858 – 15 October 1927) was the colonel-commandant of the Royal Army Medical Corps, and the author of its official history.

== Early life ==
Macpherson, the 3rd son of the Rev. William Macpherson, was born in 1858 at the Manse of Kilmuir Easter in Ross-shire, Scotland.

He received his education at Fettes College, Edinburgh, and the University of Edinburgh, where he graduated in classics in 1879; M.B., C.M. in 1882. While at Edinburgh he was a boxing champion and a talented gymnast. With the aid of a scholarship he then further studied at Tübingen & Leipzig in Germany, in medicine, German and logic.

== Military career ==
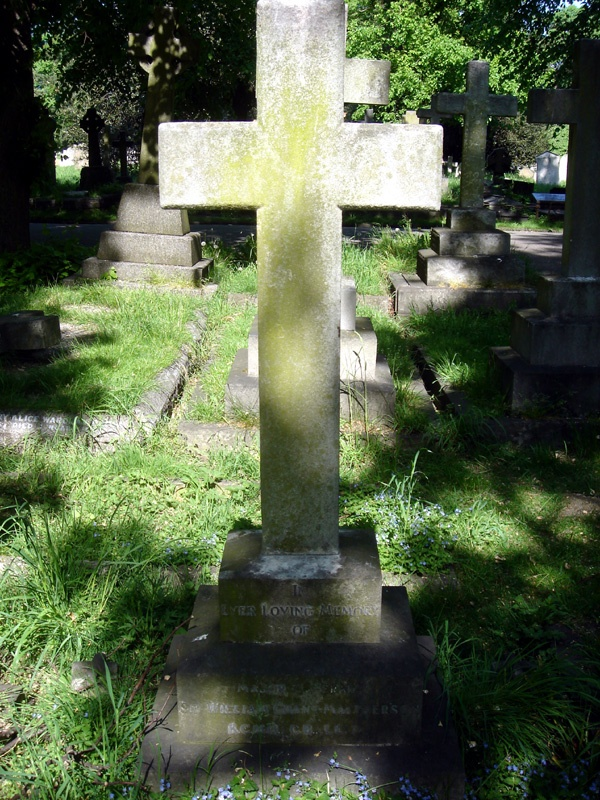
Funerary monument, Brompton Cemetery, London

Having been commissioned into the British Army Medical Service his first Imperial tour of service was in India, from thence to a 5-year spell with the Gibraltar garrison, where along with his military duties he acted as the Rock's Medical Officer for Health. Whilst he was there he also found time to be the Editor of the Gibraltar Chronicle and was active in horse-racing and polo matches.

Returning to England in 1890 he was appointed DADG, AMD2 at the War Office, a post which he held until 1902. In recognition of services during the Second Boer War, he was appointed a Companion of the Order of St Michael and St George (CMG) in the South African Honours list published on 26 June 1902. Promotion to lieutenant-colonel followed on 3 February 1903.

In 1902 he went on a mission to South Africa in the aftermath of the Boer War to see what lessons could be drawn for the Army Medical Service, his paper: Detailed Reports on Sanitary Conditions relating to the proposed Cantonments & Encampments for the Troops in South Africa was resultant.

In 1904 he was appointed senior medical officer to the North China Command, and during this posting was attached as an observer with the Japanese Army in Manchuria for 2 years during its operations in that region during the Russo-Japanese War. The results of his experiences produced his Medical & Sanitary Reports from Officers attached to the Japanese Forces in the Field.

On return to England in 1907 he joined the staff of the Director of Military Operations at the War Office. Tragedy struck in 1907 with the death of his wife, Elizabeth.

In 1910 he was appointed as PMO at Malta, also remarrying this year to Geraldine, the daughter of General Sir John Doran, of Wexford, Ireland.

In 1911 he requested and received the appointment as ADMS to the 4th Quetta Division in India, a post which allowed him to join his only son, who was himself then soldiering at the Quetta Imperial Garrison at the time. Whilst in Quetta he also held the post of lecturer at its staff college for 3 years.

In early 1914 he returned to England in company with Sir Arthur Sloggett as his deputy on Sloggett's appointment as the director-general of the British Army's Medical Service at the War Office. Macpherson was in consequence appointed DDG AMS in 1914.

=== World War I ===
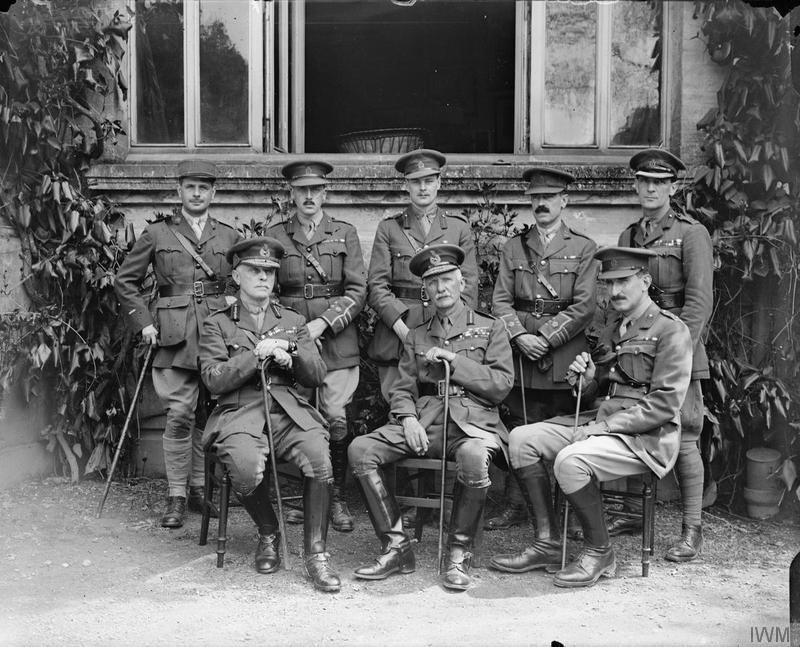
Lieutenant-General Sir Arthur Sloggett, Director-General Army Medical Service and Staff. On his left is Major-General Sir William Macpherson, Hesdin, France, 21 May 1918.

After the entry of England into the opening of the conflict in August 1914, Macpherson relinquished his post at the War Office and entered France on 7 October 1914, with the rank of a brigadier-general in the Army Medical Service Staff, first occupying the post of Advisor attached to the Indian Corps. Whilst with the Indian Corps his only child, Duncan, fell in action whilst serving as a lieutenant with the 7th Gurkha Rifles at Festubert on 23 November 1914 at the age of 25; Macpherson had spoken with him last only a few hours previously. This was the greatest sorrow of Macpherson's life, and he would not discuss the issue ever afterwards.

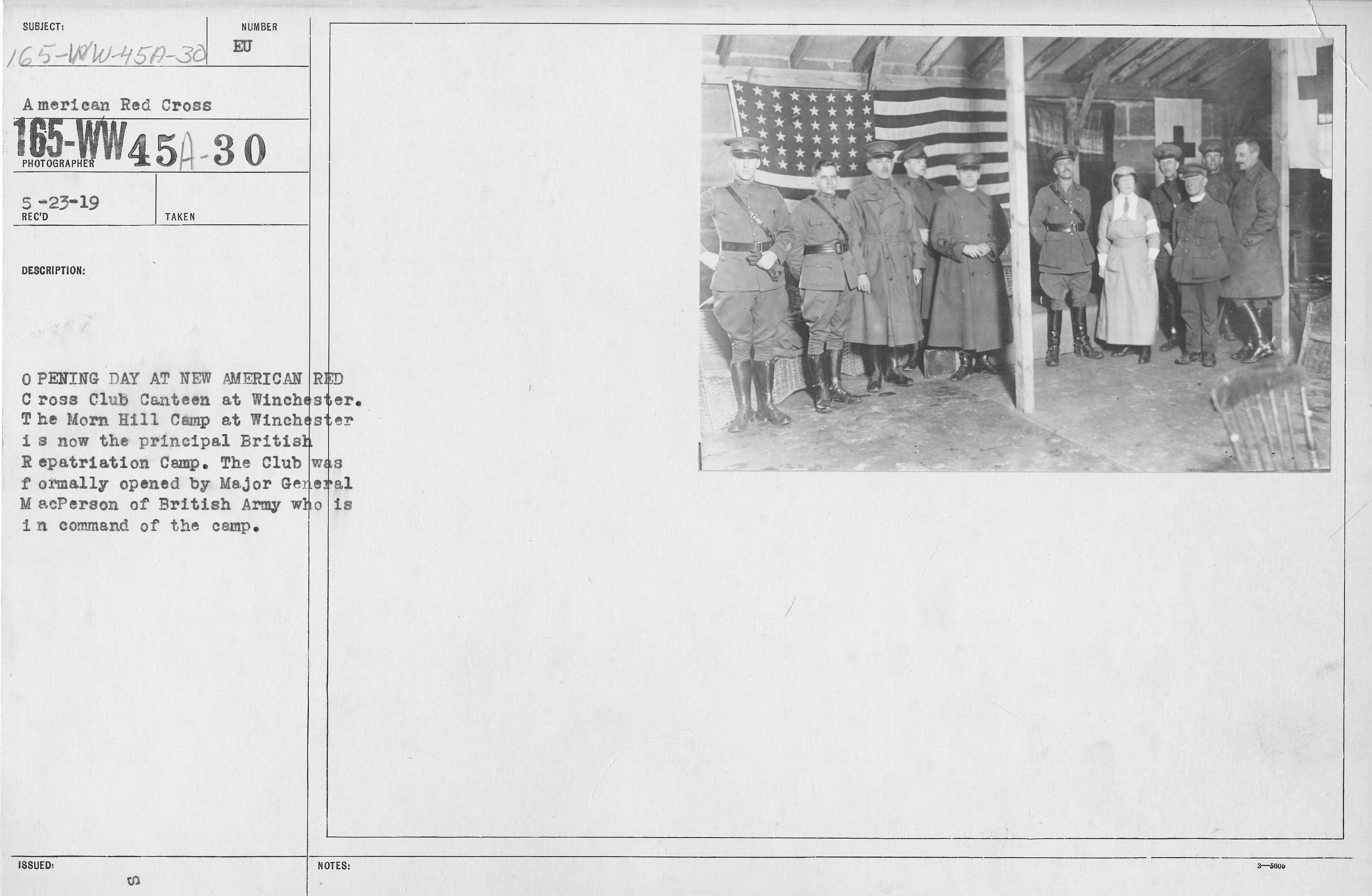

In 1915 he was appointed as Director Medical Services, 1st Army, BEF France. In October that year he travelled to Salonika, where he held the post of DMS Salonika British Expeditionary Force.

In March 1916 he returned to France to re-join the BEF there and assumed the post of DDGMS at General Headquarters, a position he retained until June 1918, when he was retired as having attained the service age limit. His rank on retirement was as a major-general.

During the war, he was mentioned in despatches nine times, and received honours from France, Italy and the United States. He was known as "Tiger Mac" on account of his energy and thoroughness. He was later appointed colonel-commandant of the RAMC.

== Later life ==
Macpherson wrote extensively about wartime medical conditions in the Boer War and World War I, including the official Medical History of the War (HMSO 1922), and also edited Surgery of the War (HMSO, in two volumes). Prior to the war in 1909, he translated from German The Strategical and Tactical Employment of the Medical Service, as Carried Out in an Army Corps; with a Series of Problems by Maximilian Ritter von Hoen. He was a reviewer of other published works and frequent contributor to medical and military journals and reference works being composed.

From 1921 to 1926 he was the R.A.M.C. representative on the British Medical Association's Council, and was a member of the Naval & Military Committee from 1921 to 1927.

He was a member of the Savile and the Junior Services Clubs, & also a keen golfer in his later years.

He died on 15 October 1927 in London. A funeral service was held at Holy Trinity Church, Brompton, London on 19 October 1927. He is buried in Brompton Cemetery, London. There is a memorial tablet to him in St Giles' Cathedral, Edinburgh.
