= Jeremy Rowan =

Former British physician and army general (born 1957)

Major General Jeremy Rowan CB OBE
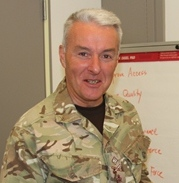
- Rowan in 2015
- Born: Jeremy Francis Rowan
- Military career
- Allegiance: United Kingdom
- Branch: British Army
- Service years: 1983–2016
- Rank: Major General
- Unit: Royal Army Medical Corps
- Commands: Army Medical Services
- Conflicts: Gulf War; Kosovo War; Iraq War
- Awards: Companion of the Order of the Bath; Officer of the Order of the British Empire; Officer of the Order of St John

Major General Jeremy Francis Rowan, CB, OBE (born 1957) is a British physician and retired senior British Army officer. He served with the Royal Army Medical Corps from 1983 until retiring in 2016, and was deployed abroad for the Gulf War, the Kosovo War and the Iraq War. From September 2014 to June 2016, he was Director General of the Army Medical Services.

== Early life ==
Rowan was educated at the Royal Belfast Academical Institution, an all-boys grammar school in Belfast, Northern Ireland. He studied medicine at Queen's University Belfast and graduated with Bachelor of Medicine, Bachelor of Surgery, and Bachelor in the Art of Obstetrics (MB BCh BAO) degrees.

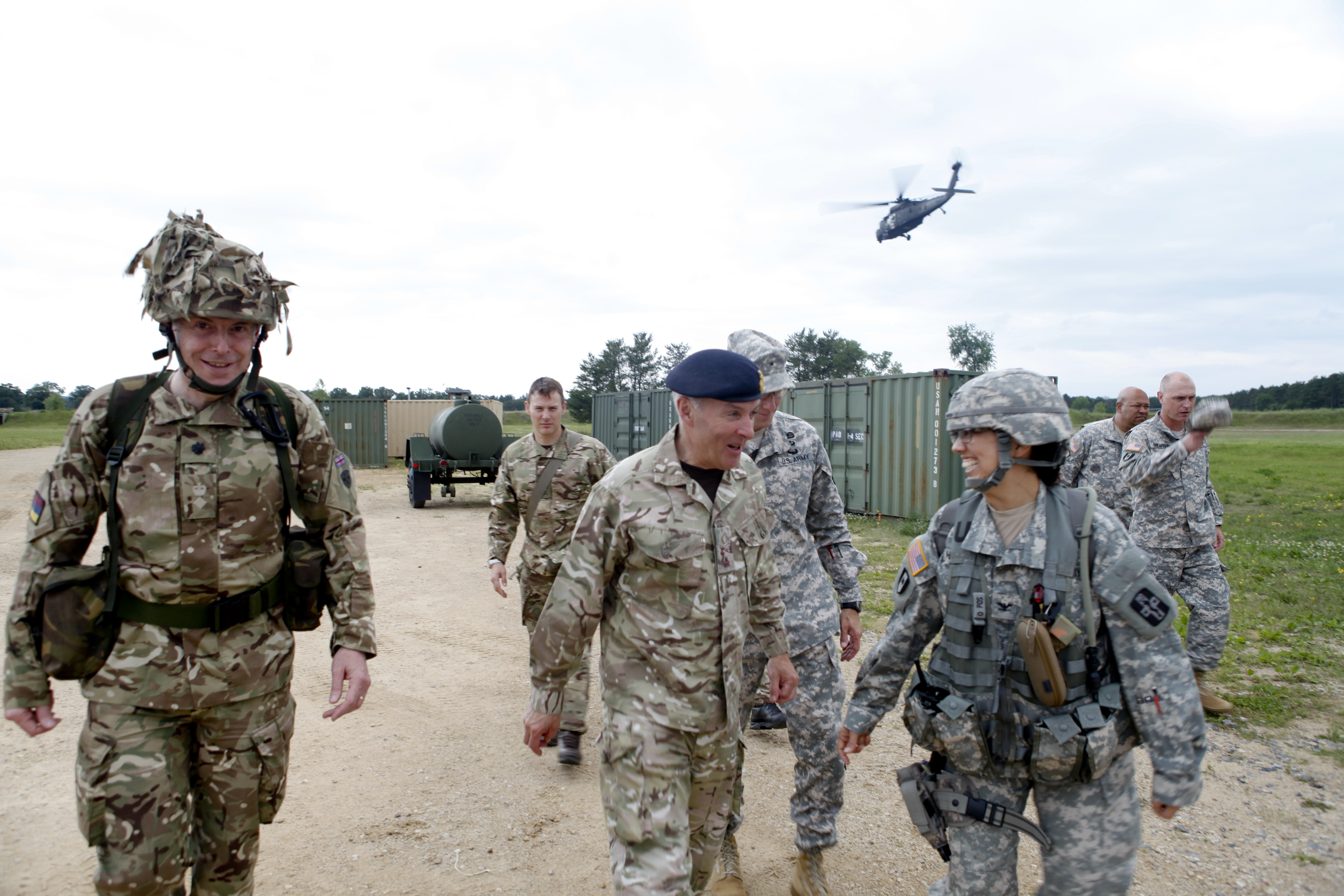
Rowan (with beret) during a field exercise in the US in 2015

Around 1987–1989, he worked as a GP at Scroggy Road Health Centre in Limavady, Co Londonderry.

== Military career ==
Rowan first joined the British Army as a part-time officer with the Territorial Army. On 1 February 1983, he was commissioned into the Royal Army Medical Corps, Territorial Army, in the rank of captain. He was promoted to major on 1 February 1988. In 1990/1991, he was deployed to Iraq as part of Operation Granby (the British effort during the First Gulf War). He was the Regimental Medical Officer of 5th (Volunteer) Battalion, Royal Irish Rangers, and in charge of the Hospital Treatment Department of 32 Field Hospital. On 9 November 1993, he transferred from a short service commission to a regular commission.

On 23 September 1991, Rowan transferred from the Territorial Army to the Regular Army, thereby becoming a full-time soldier. He was made a captain (on probation) with seniority from 23 September 1984, and instantly promoted to major (on probation). In November 1992, his commission was confirmed and he was granted seniority in the rank of major from 23 September 1989.

Rowan was promoted to lieutenant colonel on 23 September 1996. In 1999, during the Kosovo War, he was deployed to Macedonia where he was tasked with building and maintaining the refugee camps. On 30 June 2004, he was promoted to colonel. In 2005, during the Iraq War, he was deployed to Iraq, where he was responsible for the reconstruction of the five southern governorate. He spent roughly $150 million trying to regenerate the economy and deliver governance, infrastructure and security to the region.

Rowan was promoted to brigadier on 30 June 2007 and granted seniority in that rank from 30 June 2007. On 30 November 2011, he was promoted to major general and appointed Assistant Chief of Defence Staff. In September 2014, he was appointed Director General of the Army Medical Services (DGAMS). On 4 December 2015, he awarded the Ebola Medal for Service in West Africa to a group of military medics in York; it was his last engagement as DGAMS before retiring from the army. He officially retired from the British army on 8 June 2016.

== Honours and decorations ==
In November 1999, Rowan was appointed an Officer of the Venerable Order of St John (OStJ). In the 2000 New Year Honours, he was appointed Officer of the Order of the British Empire (OBE). On 1 November 2010, he was appointed an Honorary Surgeon to the Queen (QHS). In 2014, he was made a Freeman of the City of London. He was appointed Companion of the Order of the Bath (CB) in the 2016 New Year Honours.

Rowan is a recipient of a number of service medals: the Gulf Medal, the NATO Kosovo Medal, and the Iraq Medal. He is also a recipient of the Queen Elizabeth II Golden Jubilee Medal and the Queen Elizabeth II Diamond Jubilee Medal.

Military offices
Preceded by Ewan Carmichael	Director General Army Medical Services; 2014 to 2016	Succeeded by disestablished
