= Nellie Morrice =

(1881–1963) nurse and administrator

Nellie Morrice MBE ARRC
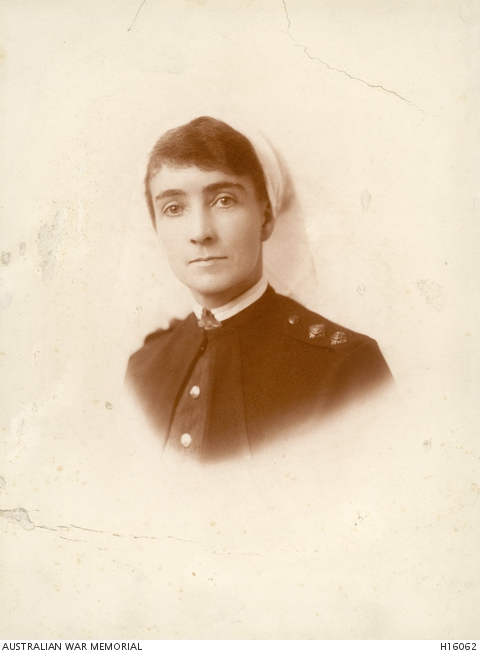
- Morrice, c. 1918
- Born: Nellie Constance Morrice; 31 March 1881; Ealing Forest, near Sutton Forest, New South Wales, Australia
- Died: 11 April 1963 (aged 82); Chatswood, New South Wales, Australia
- Military career
- Allegiance: Australia
- Branch: Australian Army Nursing Service
- Service years: 1910–1919
- Rank: Matron
- Conflicts: First World War
- Awards: Member of the Order of the British Empire; Associate of the Royal Red Cross
- Other work: Secretary, New South Wales Bush Nursing Association

Nellie Constance Morrice, MBE, ARRC (31 March 1881 – 11 April 1963) was an Australian military and civilian nurse. She served in Egypt, Greece, England and France during the First World War and was awarded the Associate of the Royal Red Cross. She was later secretary of the New South Wales Bush Nursing Association for 23 years, overseeing significant growth in its coverage.

== Early life ==
Nellie Constance Morrice was born on 31 March 1881. Her parents were Sarah Mary (née Hale) and grazier David Morrice. She was the seventh born in a family of 11 children.

== Nursing career ==
Morrice trained to be a nurse at Royal Prince Alfred Hospital, commencing in November 1903. She became a staff nurse in 1906 and was awarded her certificate in 1907 having worked in theatre, providing instruments and dispensing medication. She then completed midwifery training before working with private patients from 1907 to 1909, including as senior sister at a private hospital in Randwick.

=== War service ===
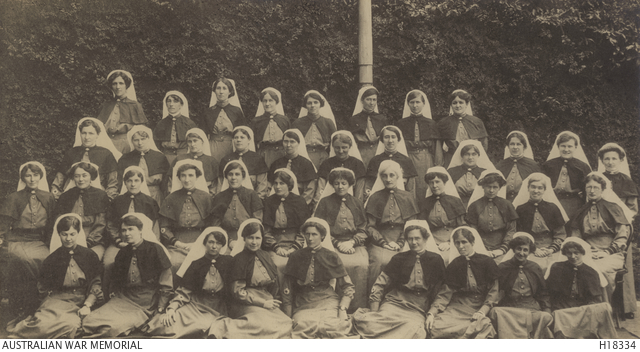
Nurses of No. 2 Australian General Hospital, including Morrice (2nd row, 4th from left), prior to embarkation in November 1914

Morrice joined the Australian Army Nursing Service in May 1910. She signed up as a sister with the Australian Imperial Force in November 1914 and left Australia on 28 November aboard HMAT Kyarra. On arrival in Egypt, she nursed with the No. 2 Australian General Hospital at Mena House, working under matron Nellie Gould.

During her time in Egypt, Morrice handmade a doll for her niece, complete with nursing uniform, which she named "Sister Helen". The doll is held in the collection of the Australian War Memorial. She volunteered for a transfer to the 2nd Australian Stationary Hospital on Lemnos in September 1915, where she nursed the soldiers wounded at Gallipoli. She was promoted to head sister in March 1916, before sailing to England in October, where she served briefly in Dartford and Brighton. From November 1916 she served at Ismailia, next posted in April 1917 to Abbeville in France with No. 3 Australian General Hospital. October 1917 saw her working under matron Adelaide Kellett at the 25th British General Hospital, a 2400-bed facility fully staffed by Australian nurses. Morrice was awarded the Royal Red Cross (2nd Class) for her service in Flanders and France.

Morrice left France in December 1918 and returned to Australia on HMAT Demosthenes,, working as matron. She received her discharge on 9 July 1919.

=== Post-war work ===
Morrice joined Georges Heights Military Hospital in Mosman as matron and served there until she was made secretary of the New South Wales Bush Nursing Association (BNA) in 1924. Under her leadership, the number of bush nursing centres grew from 26 to 62, but nursing award changes and the Second World War saw a number of closures when no nurse could be found to fill the role. At the time of her retirement in January 1947, 31 remained open, while several had been transferred to health department management. In the 1934 Birthday Honours, she was appointed a Member of the Order of the British Empire for her work as secretary of the NSW Bush Nursing Association. Her investiture, by Governor-General Sir Isaac Isaacs, took place at Government House, Sydney on 15 September 1934.

Morrice died at her home in Chatswood on 11 April 1963.
