= Ewan Carmichael =

Major General Ewan Carmichael CBE OStJ QHDS
- Military career
- Allegiance: United Kingdom
- Branch: British Army
- Service years: 1980–2015
- Rank: Major General
- Service number: 510595
- Commands: Director General Army Medical Services; 16 Close Support Medical Regiment
- Conflicts: Iraq War: Operation Granby; Operation Telic
- Awards: Commander of the Order of the British Empire

Major General Ewan Blythe Carmichael, CBE, OStJ, QHDS is a British dentist and retired senior British Army officer. From September 2012 to September 2014, he was the director general of the Army Medical Services. He is the current chairman of the Society for Army Historical Research.

== Early life ==
Carmichael is the son of Blythe Carmichael(who was educated at Rothesay Academy, a state school in Rothesay, Bute, )Scotland. He himself was born in Paisley and went to John Neilson. He studied dental surgery at the University of Glasgow, graduating as a qualified dentist.

== Military career ==
On 1 August 1980, Carmichael was commissioned into the Royal Army Dental Corps as a second lieutenant (on probation). He was given the service number 510595. This was part of his dental cadetship whereby he was sponsored by the British Army during his university studies. He achieved his Bachelor of Dental Surgery (BDS) in 1982 from University of Glasgow. Following this, his commission was confirmed and he was promoted to captain on 14 July 1982. He was then posted to the Headquarters and Training Unit RADC in Aldershot Garrison, Hampshire to complete his training.

On 14 July 1984, he transferred from a short service to a regular commission. He was posted to 16 Field Ambulance in 1984. In 1987, he attended the Junior Command and Staff Course at the Staff College, Camberley. He was then promoted to major on 14 July 1987, and posted to 4 Armoured Field Ambulance as a squadron commander. Between 1990 and 1991, he was posted to Iraq as part of Operation Granby, the British military operations during the First Gulf War. From 1991 to 1993, he was posted to Northern Ireland in the mostly clinical role of Senior Dental Officer. In 1994, he entered the Staff College, passing in 1995. He was promoted to lieutenant colonel on 14 July 1995. He was posted to be attached to the Army Medical Directorate. He was appointed commanding officer of 16 Close Support Medical Regiment in 1999. He was deployed to Bosnia in 2000 and to Macedonia in 2001. Upon returning from Macedonia, he was once posted to the staff of the Army Medical Directorate. In late 2002 or early 2003, he was appointed Commander Medical of 3 (UK) Division.

He was promoted to colonel on 14 July 2003. From June to December 2003, he was deployed to Iraq as part of Operation Telic. His role during that time was as Commander Medical for Multinational Division (South East), making him the most senior medical officer in Southern Iraq. In 2010, he was called as a witness in relation to the death of Baha Mousa that occurred during this tour. As Commander Medical he was in charge of the medical supervision of all detainees. However, he personally had no contact with Baha Mousa and only knew of his death upon being asked to refer his death to the Royal Military Police for investigation. In 2004, he was appointed chief of staff at the Defence Medical Education and Training Agency. He was promoted to brigadier on 30 June 2006. In December 2006, he was appointed commanding officer of 2 Medical Brigade. In June 2009, he returned once more to the Army Medical Directorate as director of medical plans (army). On 31 August 2012, he was promoted to major general and appointed Director General Army Medical Services.

He retired from the army on 31 January 2015.

== Honours and decorations ==
Following his service in Northern Ireland from 1991 to 1993, Carmichael was awarded the General Service Medal. He was awarded the Gulf Medal, the campaign medal for Operation Granby. He was awarded the Iraq Medal, the campaign medal for Operation Telic.

In the 1991 Queen's Birthday Honours, he was appointed Member of the Order of the British Empire (MBE). In March 1997, he was appointed Officer of the Venerable Order of Saint John (OStJ). He was promoted to Commander of the Order of the British Empire (CBE) in the 2014 Birthday Honours.

On 19 March 2012, he was appointed Honorary Dental Surgeon to the Queen (QHDS). He relinquished the appointment on 12 December 2014.

On 21 March 2015 he was awarded an Honorary 6th Dan from the World Taekwondo Headquarters the Kukkiwon, at the Army Martial Arts Championships in Windsor by Master Hussain. In recognition of his Services to Martial Arts within the Armed Services.

Military offices
Preceded by Major General Michael von Bertele	Director General Army Medical Services; 2012 – 2014	Succeeded by Major General Jeremy Rowan
