= New South Wales Bush Nursing Association =

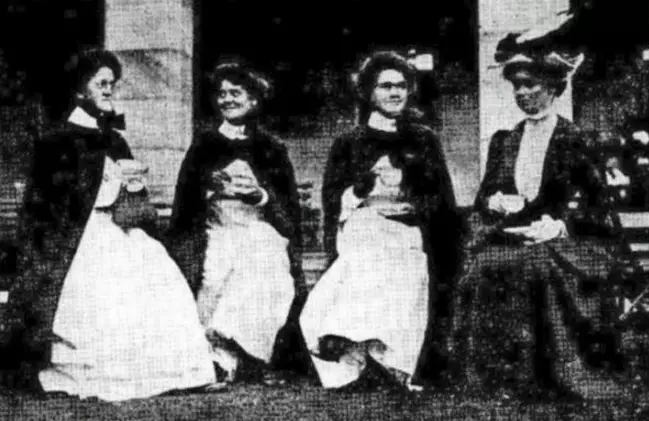
- Nurses listening to Lady Dudley outlining her Bush Nursing Scheme in 1910
- Founded: 1911
- Founder: Rachel Ward, Countess of Dudley
- Purpose: to "provide gratuitously or otherwise Trained Nurses and other requisites and attention for sick and injured persons in country towns and districts"
- Headquarters: Sydney
- Subsidiaries: 119 locations at its height

The New South Wales Bush Nursing Association was an Australian nursing organization founded in 1911 by Rachel Ward, Countess of Dudley, while she was serving as the Viceregal consort of Australia. It grew to over one hundred locations It was discontinued in the 1970s as its organisation was taken over by the country's health department.

== History ==
The New South Wales Bush Nursing Association was founded in 1911 by Rachel Ward, Countess of Dudley, who was the estranged wife of William Ward, 2nd Earl of Dudley, the Governor-General of Australia. She had been discussing the idea for some time. Her first attempt at a launch for the project had failed when the money was inadequate, It was initially called the NSW Bush Association and its purpose was to "provide gratuitously or otherwise Trained Nurses and other requisites and attention for sick and injured persons in country towns and districts". Its success was assured when the National Council of Women became involved and the state supplied funding in 1912.

The qualified Bush Nurses were based in locations that were typically 50 or 60 miles from an alternative source of expertise. They were valued particularly by expectant mothers.

Rosa Angela Kirkcaldie became the secretary of the association in 1922 but she resigned in 1924. Nellie Morrice who was an experienced matron, with a Royal Red Cross, was appointed as her replacement. Under Morrice's management, the number of bush nursing centres grew from 26 to 62, but nursing award changes and World War II saw some closures when no nurse could be found to fill the role. Morrice was awarded an MBE (in 1934) and in 1947, when Morrice retired there were 31 centres open (in addition to those that had been transferred to the health department).

In 1953 there were 31 different centres of the Association with headquarters in Sydney. Elsie Jane Whicker was based there as the new superintendent. Whicker travelled a lot to visit the diaspora of centres and to attend conferences. She kept and enjoyed a detailed correspondence with each of the nurses thanking them for being loyal and praising their commitment and achievements. The Bush Nurses enjoyed a good degree of self-management but their job could also be lonely. Whicker's contribution to the bush nursing was recognised with a MBE in 1960.

By 1972, more people lived within travelling distances and there were just 19 centres still open. In 1975 the last ones joined the Health department's management and they became community health centres.
