= James Kirkcaldie =

New Zealand cricketer

Personal information
- Full name: James Cullen Kirkcaldie
- Born: 18 April 1875; Enfield, England
- Died: 16 August 1931 (aged 56); Dunedin, New Zealand
- Source: Cricinfo, 24 October 2020

James Cullen Kirkcaldie (18 April 1875 – 16 August 1931) was a New Zealand cricketer. He played in one first-class match for Wellington in 1903/04.

Kirkcaldie was an analytical chemist.
