= Bruce Skinner =

Major-General Bruce Skinner CB CMG MVO OStJ
- Born: 3 April 1858
- Died: 3 May 1932 (aged 74)
- Military career
- Allegiance: United Kingdom
- Branch: British Army
- Rank: Major-General
- Commands: Surgeon-General; Royal Army Medical College
- Conflicts: North-West Frontier; Second Boer War; First World War
- Awards: Companion of the Order of the Bath; Companion of the Order of St Michael and St George; Member of the Royal Victorian Order; Officer of the Venerable Order of Saint John

Major-General Bruce Morland Skinner, CB, CMG, MVO, OStJ (3 April 1858 – 3 May 1932) was a British Army officer and surgeon who served as Surgeon-General during the First World War.

Skinner was the eldest son of Charles Bruce Skinner and Harriette Catherine Tudor. He was educated at Bloxham School and the Royal Army Medical College before commissioning into the British Army as a medical officer in the Royal Army Medical Corps. He first saw active service on the North-West Frontier expedition of 1887 to 1888. He was deployed to South Africa during the Second Boer War between 1899 and 1902, was promoted to lieutenant-colonel on 29 July 1902, and was made a Member of the Royal Victorian Order (MVO) in 1906. Skinner served as Honorary Surgeon to the Viceroy of India in 1910 and was Senior Medical officer in Rawalpindi. He was subsequently Commandant of the Royal Army Medical College. He served in the First World War and was made a Companion of the Order of St Michael and St George on 14 January 1916. He became Temporary Surgeon-General on 1 November 1916 while working as the Director of Medical Services. He was invested as an Officer of the Venerable Order of Saint John on 25 October 1927.

He married Monica, the daughter of Henry Whitehouse of the Madras Civil Service. They had three sons and a daughter.
