= David Jolliffe =

Major General David Jolliffe CB FRCP
- Born: 20 March 1946 (age 80)
- Military career
- Allegiance: United Kingdom
- Branch: British Army
- Service years: 1967–2003
- Rank: Major General
- Service number: 484099
- Commands: Cambridge Military Hospital (1993–1994); Medical HQ, Land Command (1999–2000); Army Medical Services (2000–2003)
- Awards: Companion of the Order of the Bath (CB)
- Other work: Governor of Ratcliffe College (2001 to 2008); Chair of the Court of the London School of Hygiene & Tropical Medicine (2009 to 2014)

Major General David Shrimpton Jolliffe, CB, FRCP (born 20 March 1946) is a retired senior British Army officer, who was director general of the Army Medical Services from 2000 to 2003. From 2009 to 2014, he was the chair of the Court of the London School of Hygiene & Tropical Medicine, having been a member of the board from 2006.

== Early life ==
Jolliffe was born on 20 March 1946 to John Hedworth Jolliffe and Gwendoline Florence Angela Jolliffe (née Shrimpton). He was educated at Ratcliffe College, a Catholic private school in the village of Ratcliffe on the Wreake, Leicestershire. He went on to study medicine at King's College London. He qualified MRCS, LRCP in 1969. He achieved his Bachelor of Medicine, Bachelor of Surgery (MB BS) the following year having spent his pre-registration year at King's College Hospital.

== Military career ==
On 17 May 1967, Jolliffe was commissioned into the Royal Army Medical Corps as a second lieutenant (on probation) as part of his medical cadetship. He was given the service number 484099. He was transferred to a pre-registration commission on 16 May 1969 and was promoted to lieutenant (on probation). On 7 July 1970, his commission was confirmed and he was promoted to captain.

He served as a regimental medical officer with 23 Para Field Ambulance from 1971 to 1973 and with 2nd Battalion, Parachute Regiment from 1973 to 1974. He was promoted to major on 7 July 1975. He transferred to a regular commission on 9 September 1976. He was given seniority in the rank of captain from 7 July 1970 and in the rank of major from 7 July 1975. In 1982, he was appointed consultant advisor in dermatology to the army, specialising in tropical dermatology. He was promoted to lieutenant colonel on 7 July 1983. He was commanding officer of the British Military Hospital in Hong Kong from 1986 to 1989. He was elected a Fellow of the Royal College of Physicians in 1987.

He was promoted to colonel on 7 October 1992, having been an acting colonel at that date. He was commanding officer of Cambridge Military Hospital, Aldershot from 1993 to 1994. He was chief of staff of the Army Medical Directorate from 1996 to 1999. He was promoted to brigadier on 19 March 1999. From 1999 to 2000, he was commander of Medical HQ, Land Command. On 7 February 2000, he was promoted to major general and appointed Director General Army Medical Services.

He retired from the British Army on 23 July 2003.

== Later life ==
In 2003, Jolliffe was appointed honorary medical advisor to the Royal Commonwealth Ex-Services League. He was the chairman of the Hong Kong Locally Enlisted Personnel Trust from 2001 to 2011, and a trustee since 2001. Between 2001 and 2008, he was governor of his old school Ratcliffe College, near Leicester. He is also a volunteer ranger on the North York Moors and has been a trustee of Blind Veterans UK since 2004.

He continued his medical work as a member of the board, from 2006 to 2014, and chair of the Court, from 2009 to 2014, of the London School of Hygiene & Tropical Medicine.

== Personal life ==
In 1969, Jolliffe married Hilary Dickinson. Together they had two daughters. He also has three grandsons and one granddaughter He lives in Pickering, North Yorkshire.

== Honours and decorations ==
Jolliffe was appointed Honorary Physician to the Queen (QHP) on 1 July 1999. He relinquished the appointment on 30 June 2003. In the 2003 New Year Honours, he was appointed Companion of the Order of the Bath (CB).

On 1 March 2004, he was appointed honorary colonel of 207 Field Hospital (Volunteers), a Territorial Army unit based in Manchester. His tenure expired on 1 April 2009.
