= Arthur Sloggett =

Lieutenant-General Sir Arthur Sloggett KCB KCMG KCVO FRCS
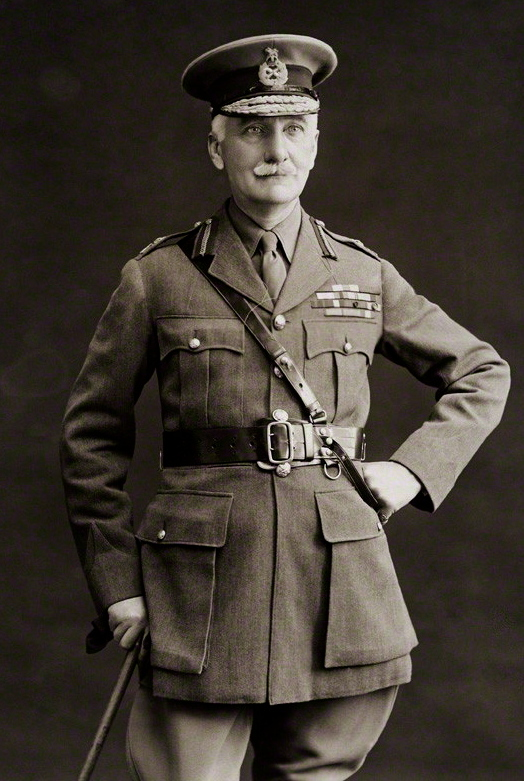
- Sir Arthur Sloggett in 1917
- Born: 24 November 1857
- Died: 27 November 1929 (aged 72)
- Military career
- Allegiance: United Kingdom
- Branch: British Army
- Rank: Lieutenant-General
- Unit: Royal Army Medical Corps
- Commands: Director General Army Medical Services
- Conflicts: Mahdist War; Second Boer War; First World War
- Awards: Knight Commander of the Order of the Bath; Knight Commander of the Order of St Michael and St George; Knight Commander of the Royal Victorian Order; Knight of Grace of the Order of St John of Jerusulem; Mentioned in Despatches; Order of the Medjidie (Ottoman); Legion of Honour (France); Order of Leopold (Belgium)

Lieutenant-General Sir Arthur Thomas Sloggett, KCB, KCMG, KCVO, FRCS (24 November 1857 – 27 November 1929) was a medical doctor and British Army officer. He served as Director General Army Medical Services in 1914 and Director-General of the Medical Services of the British Armies in the Field during First World War.

== Biography ==
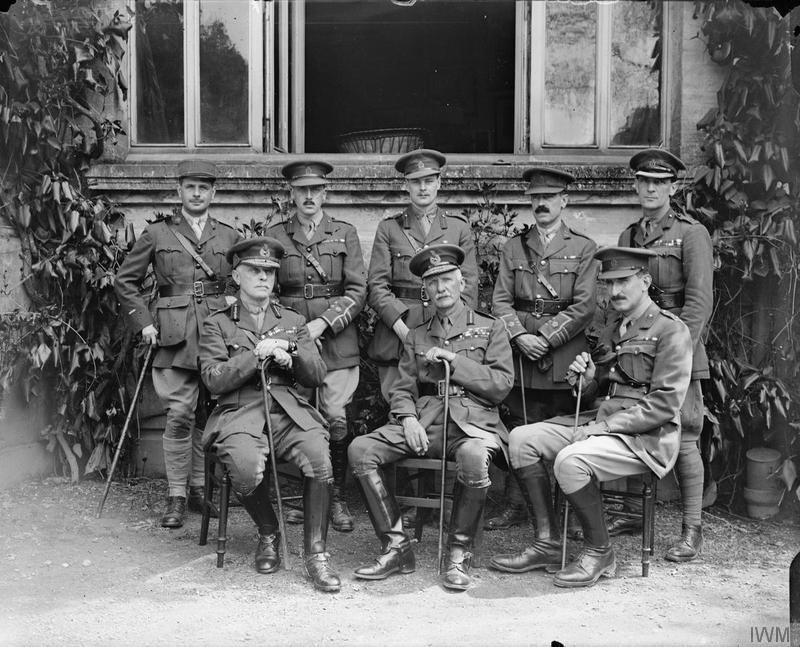
Lieutenant-General Sir Arthur Sloggett, Director-General Army Medical Service and Staff. On his left is Major-General Sir William Macpherson, Hesdin, France, 21 May 1918.

He was the son of the late Inspector-General W. H. Sloggett, R.N., and of his wife, Elizabeth, daughter of Thomas Cornish-Crossing J.P., of Stoke Damerel, Devon. Sloggett was educated at King's College London. Entering into the army as surgeon on 5 February 1881, he was soon promoted to Surgeon Captain and then Surgeon Major on 5 February 1893. In the Dongola Campaign of 1896, he served as senior medical officer of British Troops, was mentioned in dispatches in November 1896, and was specially promoted to surgeon Lieutenant-Colonel on 18 November 1896. During the Mahdist War, he served as Senior Medical Officer of the 1st Brigade, British Division, and took part in the battle of Omdurman. He was dangerously wounded, when his horse was shot from under him, and he himself was shot through the chest by a bullet. For his services in the Nile Expedition he was mentioned in despatched in September 1898, and was specially promoted to the higher rate of pay of Lieutenant-Colonel on 16 October 1898. He also received the Egyptian medal with a clasp; a third class of the Order of the Medjidie; and the fourth class of the Osmanieh. He was appointed a Knight of Grace of the Order of St John of Jerusulem on 7 March 1900.

Sloggett then served in the Second Boer War from 1899 to 1902, first in charge of the Imperial Yeomanry hospital, afterwards as principal medical officer of a general hospital, and then as commandant of Deelfontein district and as Deputy Administrator for Cape Colony. He took part in operations in the Transvaal, the Orange River Colony, and Cape Colony. He was mentioned in dispatches in 1901, and received the Queen's medal with three clasps, the King's medal with two clasps, and was invested as a Companion of the Order of St Michael and St George on 9 September 1903.

He was promoted to Surgeon-General on 13 May 1908, and then between 24 July 1908 and 30 December 1911 was Principal Medical Officer, 6th (Poona) Division in Bombay, India. In 1910 he was invested as a Companion of the Order of the Bath on 31 December 1911. He was appointed Principal Medical Officer at headquarters in India and Director of Medical Services in India. Sloggett also became an Honorary Surgeon to the King. On 1 June 1914, he was appointed Director General of the Army Medical Services, with the rank of Lieutenant-General.

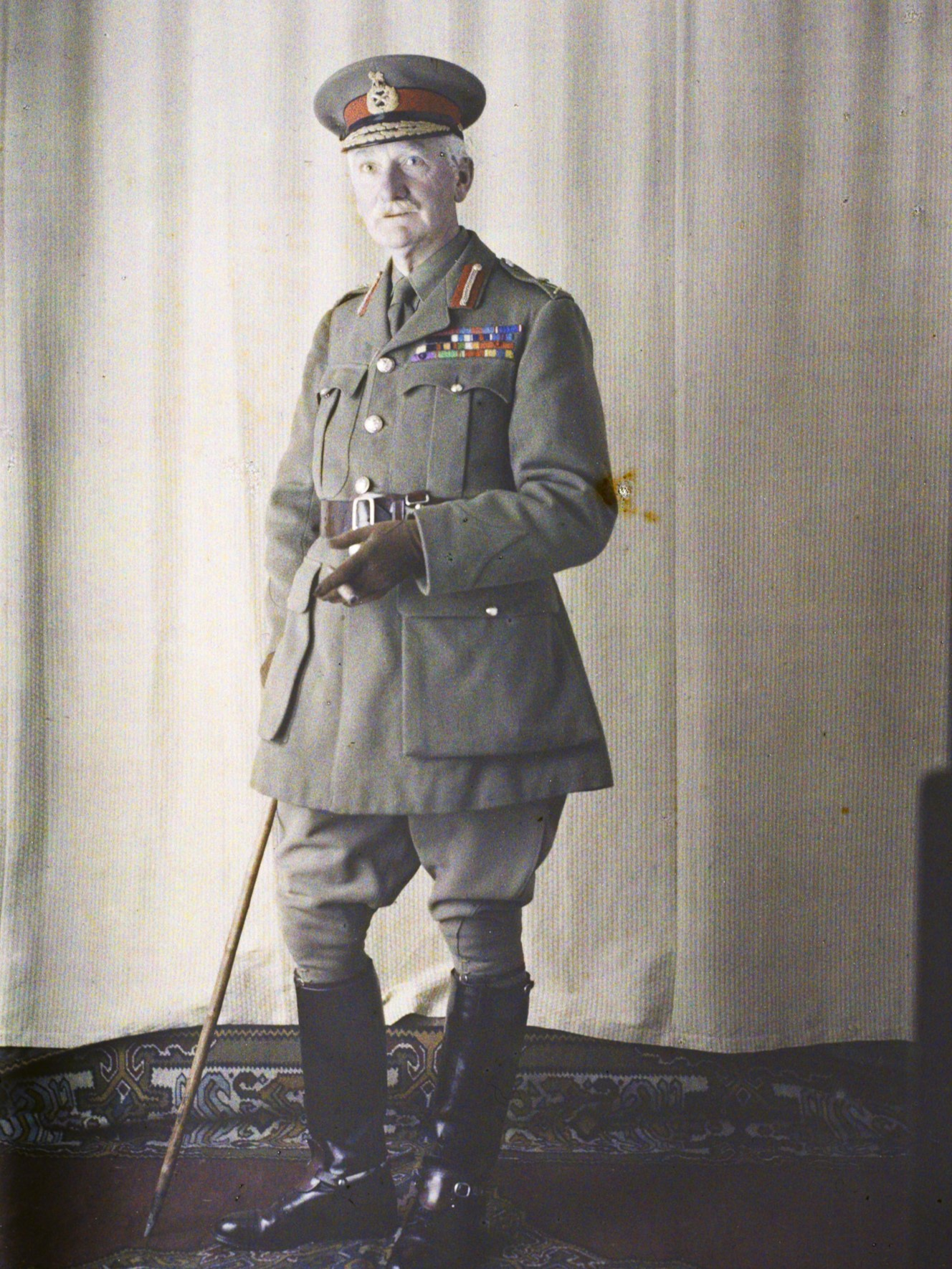
Autochrome portrait by Auguste Léon, 1917

Two months after his appointment as Director-General, the First World War started. He was sent to France on 28 October 1914, taking up the role of Director-General of Medical Services of the British Expeditionary Force and Chief Commissioner of the British Red Cross Society and St John Ambulance Association. The responsibility of dealing with and organising the whole of the medical services at home and abroad became too much for him and caused him to become ill. It was decided, therefore, that Sloggett should remain the Director-General on active service abroad and Sir Alfred Keogh rejoined the services from retirement to become Director-General on the duties at home. Sloggett remained in France for nearly four years, until June 1918, when his four years' term of office as Director-General came to an end. For his service during the war he was mentioned in dispatches seven times. He was made a Knight of the Order of the Bath and awarded the Legion of Honour in 1915, the Order of King Leopold of Belgium, Commander (3rd class) in 1916, and was invested as a Knight Commander of the Order of St Michael and St George and a Knight Commander of the Royal Victorian Order in 1917. In 1917, he was also elected a Fellow of the Royal College of Surgeons of England.

Sir Arthur Thomas Sloggett died suddenly while walking with his son near Regent's Park. He is buried in St Peter's Church, Petersham, together with his wife Helen (d 1939).

Military offices
Preceded by Sir William Gubbins	Director General Army Medical Services; 1914	Succeeded by Sir Alfred Keogh
