= Royal Army Medical College =

College in Westminster, London, England

- Millbank
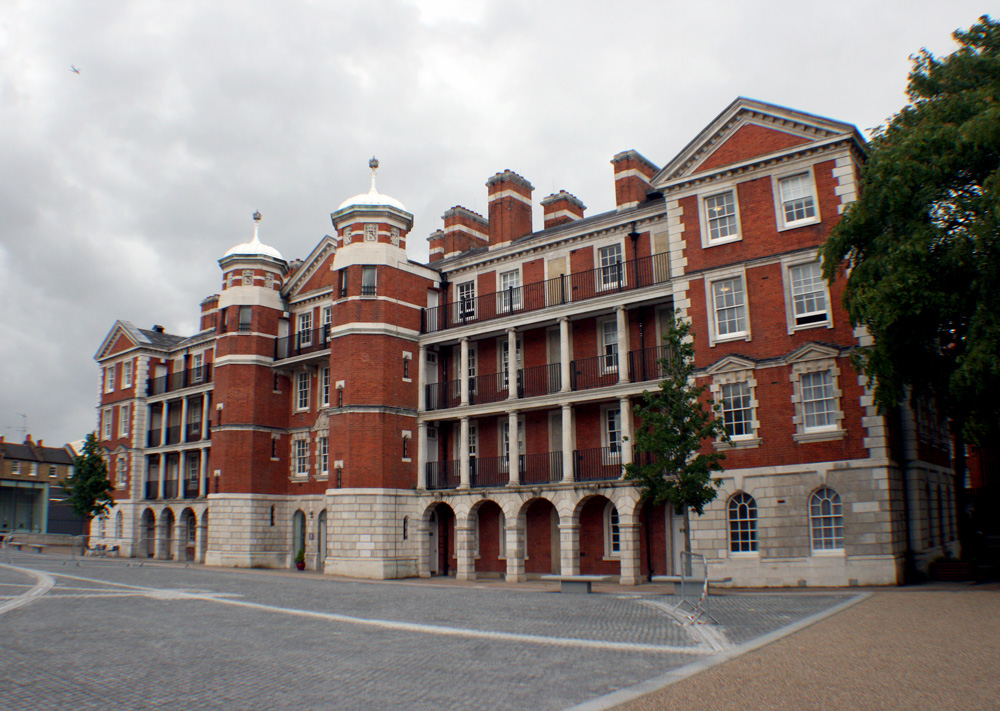
- Royal Army Medical College

Site information
- Type: Military College
- Owner: Ministry of Defence
- Operator: British Army

Location
- Location within Westminster
- Coordinates: 51.49039°N 0.12892°W

Site history
- Built: 1907
- Built for: War Office
- In use: 1907-1999

The Royal Army Medical College (RAMC) was located on a site south of the Tate Gallery (now known as Tate Britain) on Millbank, in Westminster, London, overlooking the River Thames. The college moved from the site in 1999 and the buildings are now occupied by the Chelsea College of Arts. The area around the college including the Tate, former military hospital and other adjacent areas is a conservation area. The former college buildings are now listed.

== History ==
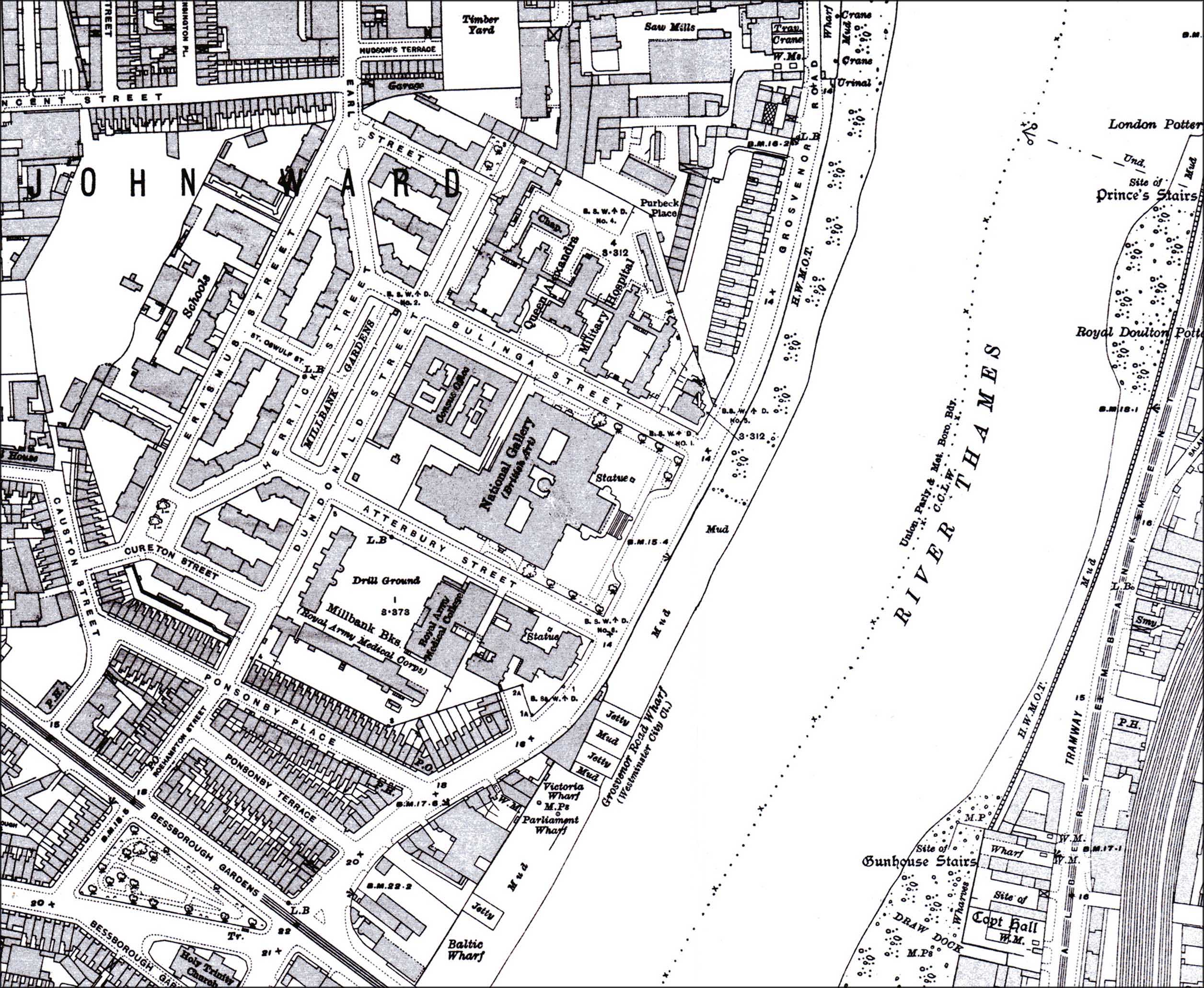
Ordnance Survey maps of London extract for 1916. This shows clearly the octagonal outline of the former penitentiary surrounding the small site. At the centre is the National Gallery of British Art, afterwards known as the Tate Gallery, and now as Tate Britain, with the college in the south of the site and hospital in the north. Most of the streets remain as at 2012 apart from Bulinga Street, most of which has been built over, and Dundonald Street which has been renamed 'John Islip Street'. There is a 'Census Office' at the rear of the gallery, long since gone.

The site, including that of the Tate Gallery (which opened in 1897), was previously occupied by the Millbank Prison from 1821 to the late 19th century. The college was built by John Henry Townsend and Wilfred Ainslie in Imperial Baroque style. They also designed the adjoining Regimental Officers' Mess and Commandant's House, in French Renaissance style. The buildings were opened by King Edward VII and Queen Alexandra on 15 May 1907. A statue of Sir James McGrigor, the father of army medicine, originally at the Royal Hospital, Chelsea was moved to the grounds in 1907 and then moved again to the Royal Military Academy Sandhurst in 2000.

Queen Alexandra Military Hospital was built to the north of the Tate Gallery and opened in 1905. Sir Cooper Perry was knighted in 1903 for helping set up the college.

During the First World War the college was used to prepare vaccines, including a vaccine against typhoid which was developed at the college. The college also researched into protection against chemical warfare including the development of gas masks here. In the Second World War, the college provided courses in tropical medicine. The college was seriously damaged in 1941 by bombs and the walls of the Tate Gallery nearby still show signs of the damage.

The Royal Army Medical College was renamed the Royal Defence Medical College on 1 April 1996, offering tri-service post graduate training in a variety of disciplines, including military surgery, medicine, pathology, psychiatry, preventative medicine, entomology, general practice and dental sciences.

After teaching transferred to the Royal Hospital Haslar in Gosport in 1999, the college was removed to Fort Blockhouse. The former buildings on Millbank were subsequently occupied by the Chelsea College of Arts.

== Commandants of the Royal Army Medical College ==
(Dates in parentheses are years of service)

- Colonel H. E. R. James (1902–1908)
- Colonel D. Wardrop (1908–1911)
- Colonel Edmund John Erskine Risk LM MCRS LCRP (b.1858 d.1926) (1911–1912)
- Major-General Bruce Morland Skinner CB CMG MVO (1912–14)
- Major-General Sir David Bruce KCB, FRS, (1914–1919)
- Major-General S. Guise Moores (1919–1920)
- Colonel H. A. Hinge (1920–1922)
- Colonel C. B. Martin (1922–1924)
- Major-General C. W. Mainprise (1924–1925)
- Colonel Henry Edward Manning Douglas VC (1925–1929)
- Colonel John Southey Bostock CBE (1929–1930)
- Major-General Sir Ralph Bignell Ainsworth Kt, CB, DSO, OBE (1930–1935)
- Major-General William Porter MacArthur KCB (1935–1938)
- Major-General William Brooke Purdon (1938–1940)
- Major-General Francis Stephen Irvine (1940–1946)
- Major-General E. B. Marsh (1946–1948)
- Major-General John Dowse CB CBE MC (1948–1949)
- Major-General J. M. Macfie (1949–1950)
- Major-General F. R. H. Mollan (1950–1953)
- Major-General F. C. Hilton-Sergeant (1953–1957)
- Major-General W. D. Hughes (1957–1960)
- Major-General Sir William Robert MacFarlane Drew (1960–1963)
- Major-General Ambrose Neponucene Trelawney Meneces (1963–1966)
- Major-General John Mackenzie Matheson (1969–1971)
- Major-General James Baird (1971–1973)
- Major-General Simon Gavourin (1973–1977)
- Major-General Alan Reay (1977–1979)
- Major-General Robert Noel Evans (1979–1981)
- Major-General Joseph Porter Crowdy CB (1981–1984)
- Major-General Patrick Crawford (1989–1993)
- Major-General George Osborne Cowan (1993–1996)
