= Army Medical Services =

Medical arm of the British Army

- Cap badges of the four former constituent corps
- Country: United Kingdom
- Branch: British Army
- Role: Medical
- Size: 2 Corps
- Garrison/HQ: Camberley

Commanders
- Master-General: Major General Timothy Hodgetts

The Army Medical Services (AMS) is the organisation responsible for administering the corps that deliver medical, veterinary, dental and nursing services in the British Army. It is headquartered at the former Staff College, Camberley, near the Royal Military Academy Sandhurst.

On 15 November 2024, with the exception of the Royal Army Veterinary Corps, the constituent corps of the AMS amalgamated to form a new Corps, the Royal Army Medical Service. The AMS long predates any of the four constituent Corps, with the term dating back at least to the Napoleonic Wars, and the new Corps will take the precedence formerly held by the RAMC in the British Army's order of battle.

== Role ==
AMS is responsible for administering the corps that deliver medical, veterinary, dental and nursing services in the British Army. These are:

- Royal Army Medical Service
- Royal Army Veterinary Corps

AMS contributes to the conservation of fighting strength and morale of the Army and advises commanders on matters of health and disease.

The Defence Medical Services, by contrast, is an umbrella adjectival term, and should not been seen as equivalent to a command or an Army Corps as constituted under the Armed Forces Act 2006.

== Administration and leadership ==
The Army Medical Services are administered by Headquarters Army Medical Directorate at Andover, previously under the leadership of the Director General Army Medical Services (DGAMS), formerly Major General Jeremy Rowan. The Director General answered to the Adjutant-General, and his role was to promote effective medical, dental and veterinary health services for the Army and provide a policy focus for individual medical training, doctrine and force development. The post was disestablished after 2016.

A Freedom of Information request identified that from 2018, "day to day responsibility for medical policy and capability development" would "lie at Brigadier level," but did not indicate the title of that particular post. As of March 2019, a Brigadier is employed within the senior Army ranks as Senior Health Advisor, who "Monitors and assesses the health of the Army to assist Director Personnel in the provision of Health Policy, provides policy oversight and assurance for Commander Field Army in the generation and delivery of medical operational capability, and is directly responsible for the provision of primary care services to the Army and community mental health services to Defence."

=== List of directors general ===
- Surgeon-General Sir William Alexander Mackinnon (1889–1896)
- Surgeon-General Sir William Taylor
- Lieutenant-General Sir Alfred Keogh (1905–1910)
- Lieutenant-General Sir William Launcelotte Gubbins (1910–?)
- Lieutenant-General Sir Arthur Sloggett (1914)
- Lieutenant-General Sir Alfred Keogh (1914–1918); second term
- Lieutenant-General Sir John Goodwin (1918–1923)
- Lieutenant-General Sir William Boog Leishman (1923–1926)
- Lieutenant General Sir William MacArthur (1938–1941)
- Lieutenant-General Sir Alexander Hood (August 1941 – 1948)
- Lieutenant-General Neil Cantlie (1948-1952)
- Lieutenant-General Sir Frederick Harris (1952-1956)
- Lieutenant-General Sir Alexander Drummond (1956-1961)
- Lieutenant-General Sir Harold Knott (1961-1965)
- Lieutenant-General Sir Robert Drew (1965-26 Jul 1969)
- Lieutenant General Sir Norman Talbot (26 Jul 1969–1973)
- Lieutenant-General Sir James Baird (1973–1977)
- Lieutenant-General Sir Richard Bradshaw (1977–1981)
- Lieutenant General Sir Alan Reay (1981–1984)
- Lieutenant General Sir Cameron Moffat (1984–1988) First Surgeon General Defence Medical Services
- Major General Anthony Shaw (1988–1990)
- Major General (later Lieutenant General) Sir Peter Beale (1990–1993)
- Major General Brian Mayes (1993–1996)
- Major General Robin Short (1996–1999)
- Major General (later Lieutenant General) Robert Menzies (1999–2000)
- Major General David Jolliffe (2000–2003)
- Major General (later Lieutenant General) Louis Lillywhite (2003–2004)
- Major General Alan Hawley (2005–2009)
- Major General Michael von Bertele (2009–2012)
- Major General Ewan Carmichael (2012–2014)
- Major General Jeremy Rowan (2014–2016)

==== Master-Generals ====
- Lieutenant General Louis Lillywhite (2017–2022)
- Major General Timothy Hodgetts (2022–present)

== See also ==
- First Aid Nursing Yeomanry
- Royal Navy Medical Service
- RAF Medical Services
