= Woodhouse Grove School =

Coordinates: 53°50′24.27″N 01°41′59.39″W

Location
- Apperley Lane; Apperley Bridge, Bradford, BD10 0NR; England

Information
- Type: Private Day and Boarding School
- Motto: Bone et Fidelis (Trans: Good and Faithful)
- Religious affiliation: Methodist but also accepts children of other religions or Secular and non denominational children
- Established: 1812 "Old Foundation"; 1883 "New Foundation"
- Founder: Adam Clarke and the Wesleyan Conference
- Local authority: Bradford; Leeds (Note: The school itself is in Leeds, but public access including all road access is from a Bradford road and as such the school has a Bradford address)
- Department for Education URN: 108114 Tables
- Chair of Governors: Alan Wintersgill
- Headmaster: James Lockwood
- Gender: Co-educational
- Age: 11 to 18
- Enrolment: 721 (including 94 Boarders)
- Houses: Atkinson Findlay; Southerns; Stephenson; Towlson Vinter
- Colours: Green, Maroon, Red
- Publication: News From The Grove and The Grovian
- Former Pupils: Old Grovians
- Feeder preparatory school: Brontë House Junior Prep School
- Pre School Facility: Ashdown Lodge School
- Website: http://www.woodhousegrove.co.uk/

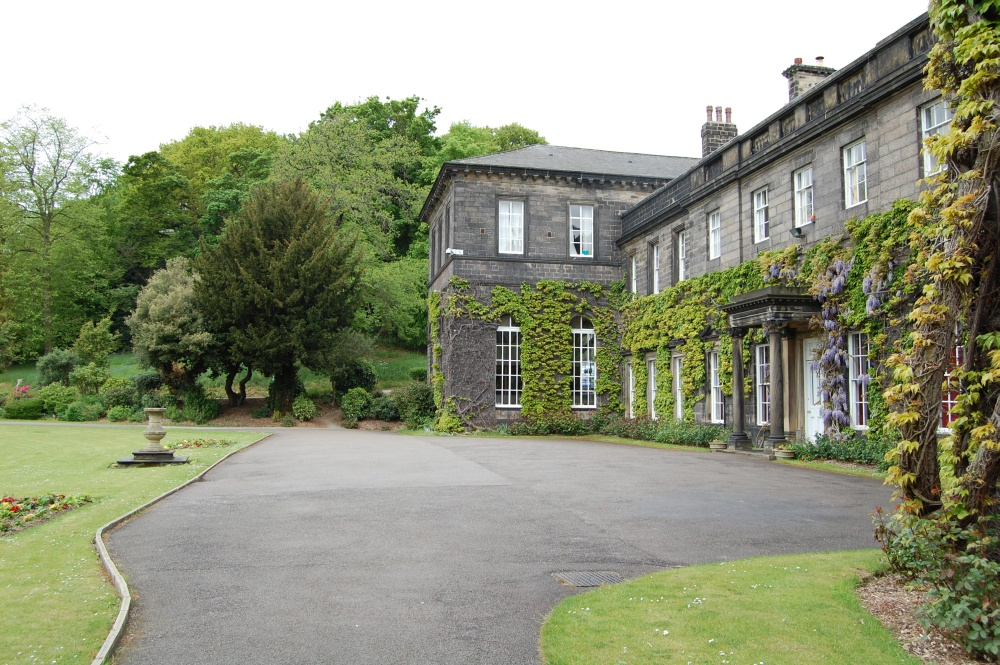
Woodhouse Grove School. The wooded Grove Mount can be seen in the background

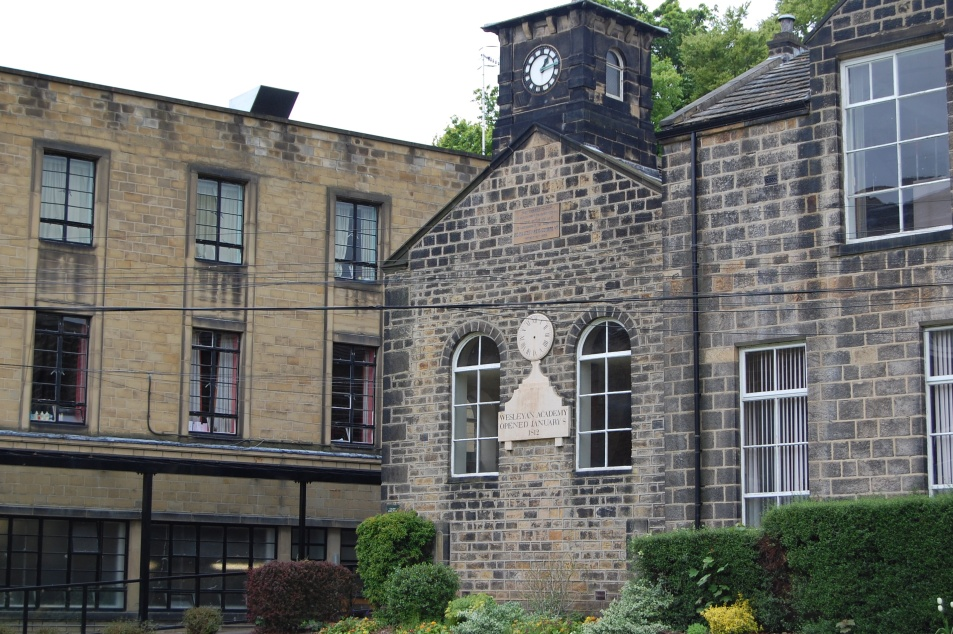
Commemorate plaque of opening date

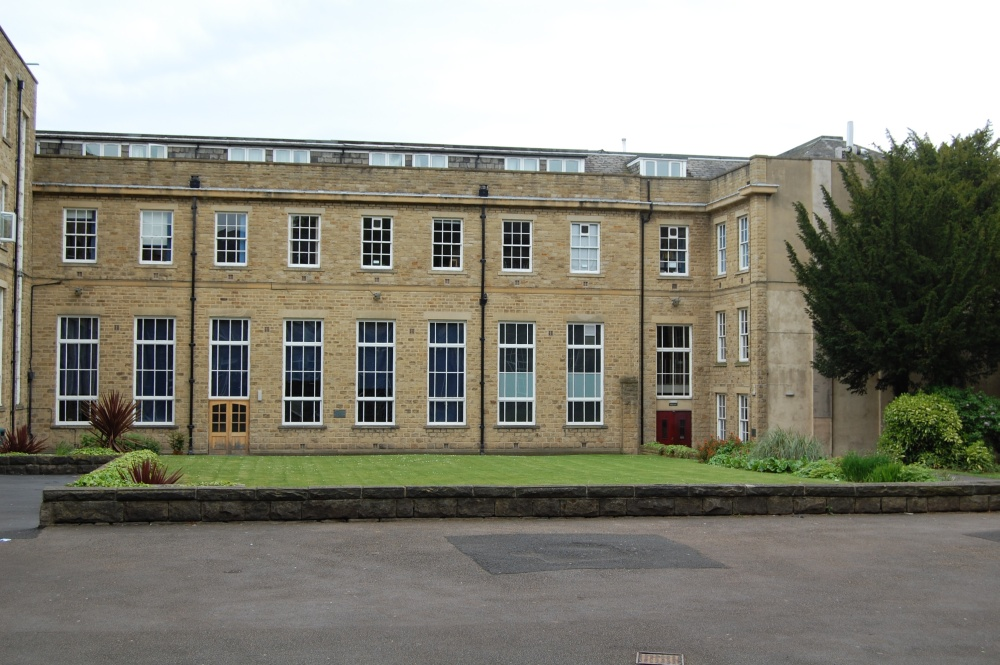
Boarding accommodation can be seen on the top floor above classrooms

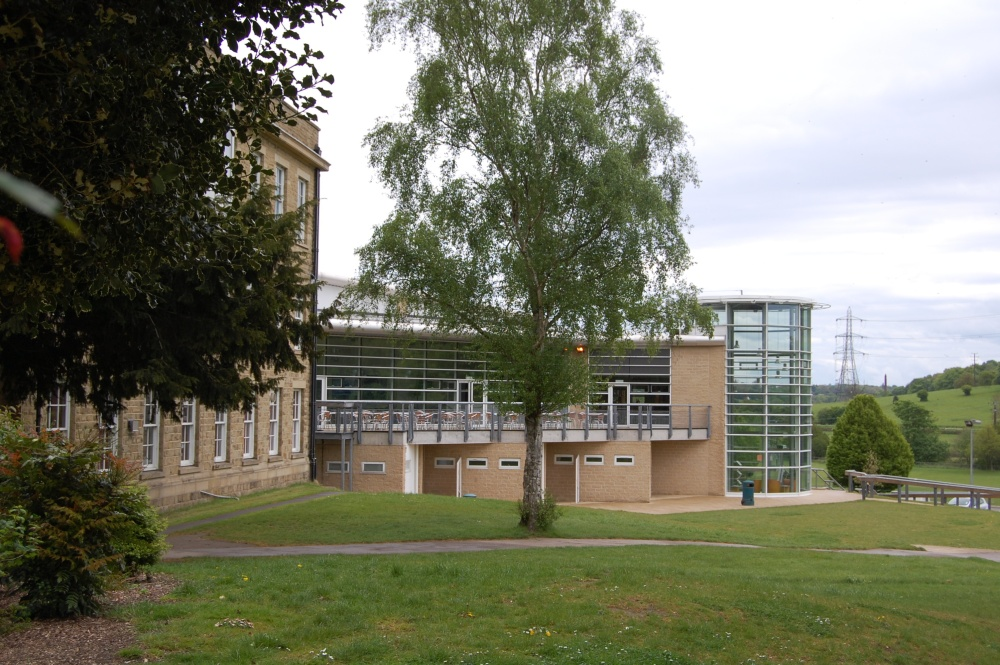
A careful mix of old and new building styles

Woodhouse Grove School ('The Grove') is a private, co-educational, day and boarding school and sixth form. it is located to the north of Apperley Bridge, West Yorkshire, England (Apperley Bridge is located in the City of Bradford, however the school is located just over the municipal border in the City of Leeds). The school, and its preparatory junior school, Brontë House, is located in the Aire Valley. There are approximately 1,000 students on roll, currently including around 90 boarders.

The school was founded as an all-boys boarding preparatory institution, for the sons of Methodist Ministers. It developed over the latter part of the 20th century. Woodhouse Grove has evolved into an independent education centre, providing education from the age of three through to graduation from the sixth form.

== Location ==
The school is located in a rural setting close to the metropolitan centres of Leeds, 10 miles (16 km) distant and Bradford, 4 miles (6 km) away. Leeds Bradford International Airport is approximately 3 miles (5 km) north-east of the school. The school benefits from the Apperley Bridge railway station, opened in 2015, which is located just across the road from the school's chapel.

== History ==
=== Early plans ===
Kingswood School, near Bath, in the West Country, served as the sole Methodist school from 1748, but was inconvenient for northern residents. The topic was raised at Conference in 1781 and John Wesley replied, "Probably we may (provide such a school). Let our brethren think of a place and a master and send me word". Adam Clarke returned to the subject at the 1806 conference, in his first year as conference president.

=== The Grove ===
With the purchase at Woodhouse Grove in Apperley, near Bradford, the decision to found the school was made by ballot at the Wesleyan Conference of 1811, still under Clarke. It initially provided an education for the sons of the itinerant ministers in service of the Wesleyan Methodist Church in the north of England. The original name, The Wesleyan Academy, as evidenced by a commemorative wall plaque at the school, did not catch on.

Few alterations were needed to convert the house for use as a school, but the barn was cleaned up as a schoolroom and the stables converted as a chapel. The drawing room became a lecture and study room and thirty wooden cribs (or cots) were provided for the boys to sleep on. The school opened on 8 January 1812 under the headship of John Fennell as first master and with an initial roll of twenty seven pupils.

For much of the 19th century, between 1812 and 1875, Woodhouse Grove and Kingswood operated as separate schools for children aged between eight and fifteen years old, with both schools under direct control of conference. The school also had a local management committee and there were frequent conflicts with conference over duplicated but differing decisions relating to teacher selection, staff salaries and building expansion needs. Between 1875 and 1883, the two schools were combined as a single school, despite the problems caused by being two hundred miles apart. The Grove served as a preparatory school with pupils then relocating at the age of thirteen to the upper school at Kingswood.

The school was refounded on 21 September 1883, the "New Foundation Day", to admit boys from a wider spectrum of backgrounds. The Grove received its first pupils as a Methodist middle class boarding and day school under a new policy laid down by the Wesleyan Conference. The sermon on the New Foundation Day was given by the Reverend Robert Newton Young, himself a former pupil of the school between 1837 and 1843, and the sermon was based around the text "Bone et Fidelis" or "Good and Faithful" which was to become the new school motto to the present day.

By the summer term of 1884, the school roll had expanded to 155 pupils. During the Second World War, and under direct grant funding after the Education Act 1944, the school expanded, with boarding pupils placed and paid for by London County Council and the East Riding of Yorkshire authority.

Traditionally a school for boys only, the school first admitted girls to the sixth form in 1979 and has been fully co-educational since 1985.

=== Brontë House ===
For several years, HM Inspector of Schools had recommended that Woodhouse Grove make better provision for younger pupils. Under the guidance of the Secretary of the Methodist Education Committee, Rev. H. B. Workman, the preparatory school at Brontë House was founded in 1934 as a junior preparatory school for five- to eleven-year-old boys. The school became a coeducational establishment in 1985.

The school stands in the grounds of a former private residence called Ashdown House and was originally known as 'Woodhouse Grove Preparatory School'. Ashdown House stood in the grounds of an older mansion known as Upperwood House where Charlotte Brontë was once governess to the White family's two children. The first master of the new school was Dr F. C. Pritchard, MA, who later wrote the 1978 history of the school and its development.

Initially, Brontë House had no kitchen facility of its own and the children were escorted back and forth in all weathers to the Grove for their lunches and dinner. Later, a small car was bought by the school to ferry prepared meals from the main school kitchen to Brontë House, until a proper kitchen was built several years later. A boarding facility is provided for pupils.

== Current school ==
The school has three parts:

- Ashdown Lodge (Nursery) – for pre-school children aged between three and five.
- Brontë House (Junior) – for children aged between five and eleven.

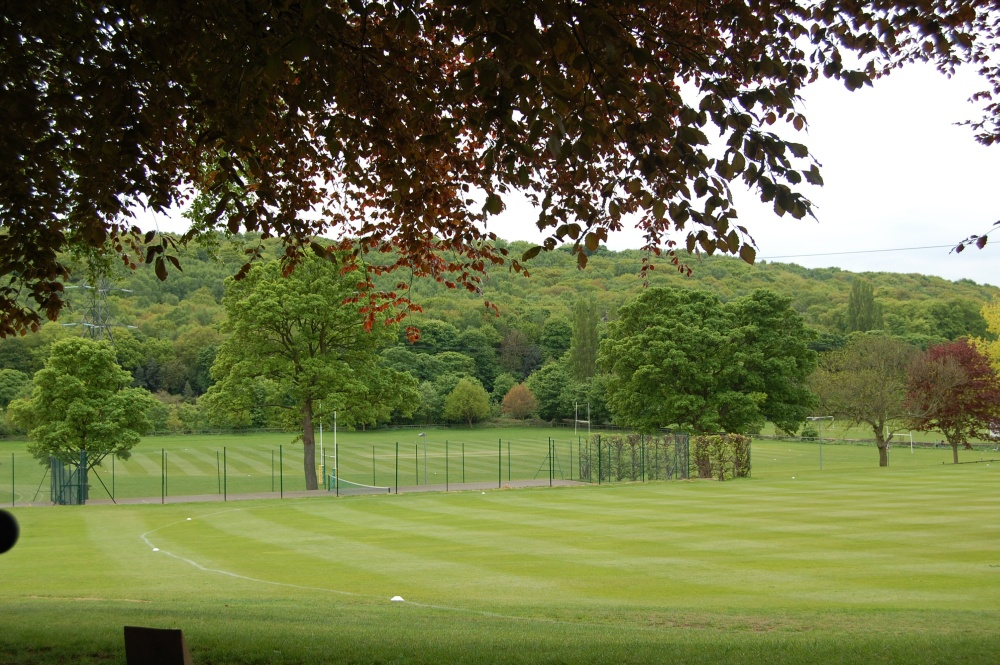
The playing fields viewed from the school

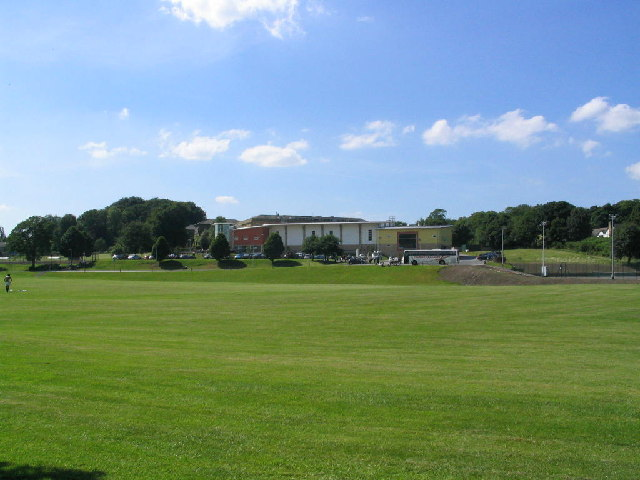
The gymnasium viewed from the playing fields

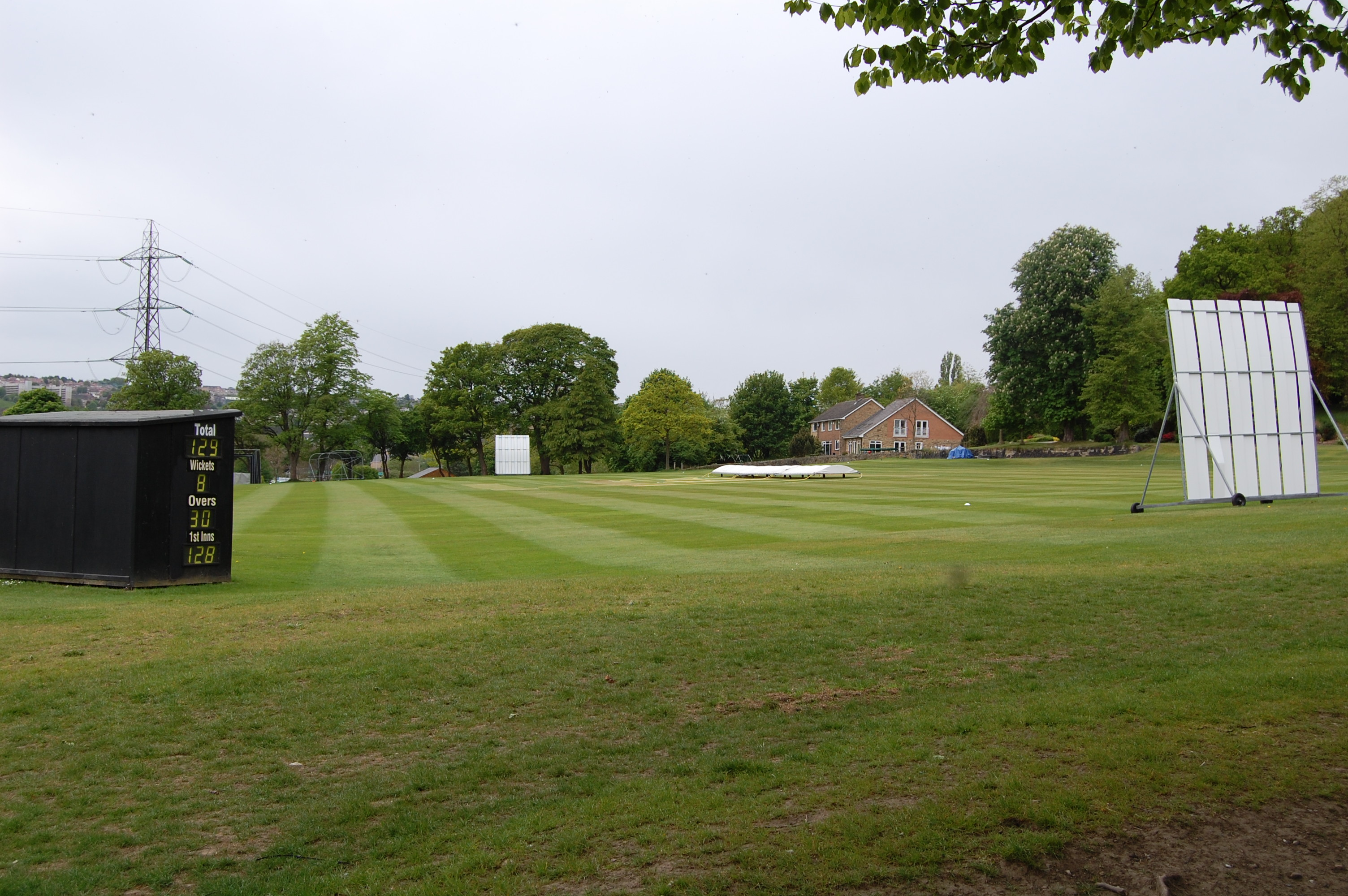
One of the school's two cricket pitches

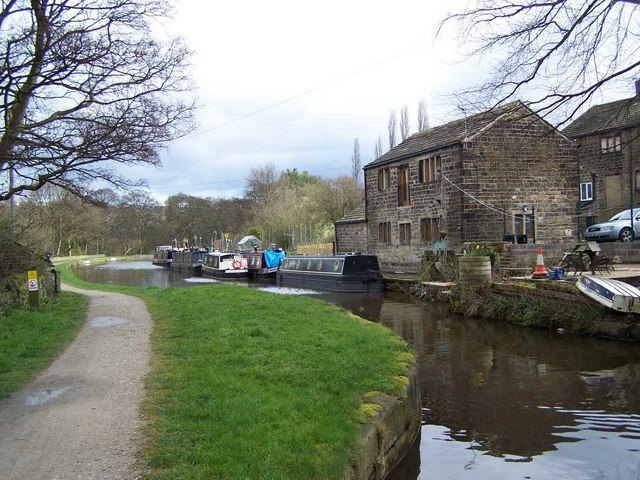
Leeds & Liverpool canal, just south of the school playing field

- Woodhouse Grove (Secondary and sixth form) – has facilities that include a sports and performing arts complex, and boarding accommodation.

The school has good examination results.

The Sports Hall and theatre complex was built in 2003, followed by a Music and Performing Arts centre in 2009. A 25m competition pool Jubilee Swimming pool was completed at the time of the school's 200th year founding anniversary.

== Notable former pupils ==
The Old Grovian Association currently has 3,600 members from previous students and staff. Notable alumni include:

Politics

- Sir Albert Newby Braithwaite DSO (2 September 1893 – 20 October 1959) was a British Conservative Party politician.
- William Mabane, 1st Baron Mabane (1895–1969), Liberal politician, held office as Assistant Postmaster-General and Minister of State for Foreign Affairs.

Science and Medicine

- John William Draper (1811–1882), chemist, botanist, historian and photographer
- George Northcroft (1885–1943), British Orthodontist
- Thomas Laycock (1812–76) English physician and neurophysiologist

Sport

- Ellie Kildunne (2011-16– ), rugby player, England Rugby World Cup Winner 2025, Runner-up Sports Personality of the Year 2025, World 15s Player of the Year 2024
- Anna Fitzpatrick (1989– ), tennis player
- George Leslie "Les" Grainge (1910–1983), rugby league footballer of the 1930s for England, and Bradford Northern
- Kathryn Leng (1985–), cricketer
- Uzair Mahomed (1987–), cricketer
- Katie O'Brien (1986– ), tennis player
- Naomi Broady (1990– ), tennis player
- Paul Sampson (1977– ), rugby player
- Ajmal Shahzad (1985– ), cricketer

Education

- John Anderson Hartley (1844–1896), educationist
- John Lockwood Kipling (1837–1911), illustrator, museum curator

Art and Literature

- John Hillaby (1917–1996), travel writer
- Thomas Hocken (1836–1910), collector, bibliographer and researcher
- Herbert Edward Palmer (1880–1961), poet
- Aasif Mandvi (1966– ) Actor
- Jessica Knappett (1984– ) Writer and actress

Military

- Michael Walker (1944– ). Field Marshal Sir Michael Walker, now Baron Walker of Aldringhan, Field Marshal Walker was Chief of the Defence Staff in the United Kingdom from May 2003 until April 2006.
- Nick Houghton (1954– ), Field Marshal Sir John Nicholas Reynolds Houghton KCB, CBE, now Baron Houghton of Richmond, was the Chief of the Defence Staff in the United Kingdom (2013–2016).
- Tim Hodgetts. Major General Timothy John Hodgetts CB, CBE, OStJ, DL was Surgeon General of the United Kingdom 2021-2024
- Phil Carter. Major General Phil Carter OStJ KHP FRCGP is currently Surgeon General of the United Kingdom.

Journalism

- Peter Brierley Johnson (1925–2016) correspondent reuters, BBC

Engineering and Architecture

- John Poulson (1910–1993), Architect

Religion

- George Scott Railton (1849–1913) Leader of The Salvation Army with William Booth, and father of David Railton and grand father of Dame Ruth Railton
- Samuel Evans Rowe (1834–1897), Methodist missionary to South Africa
- Edward Sugden (1854–1935), Methodist and first master of Queen's College (University of Melbourne)

Business

- Phil Bentley CEO Mitie Plc (1959- )
- Noel Stockdale (1920–2004), businessman and co-founder of Asda

== See also ==
- Listed buildings in Guiseley and Rawdon
