= Paul Evans (RAF officer) =

RAF officer and doctor

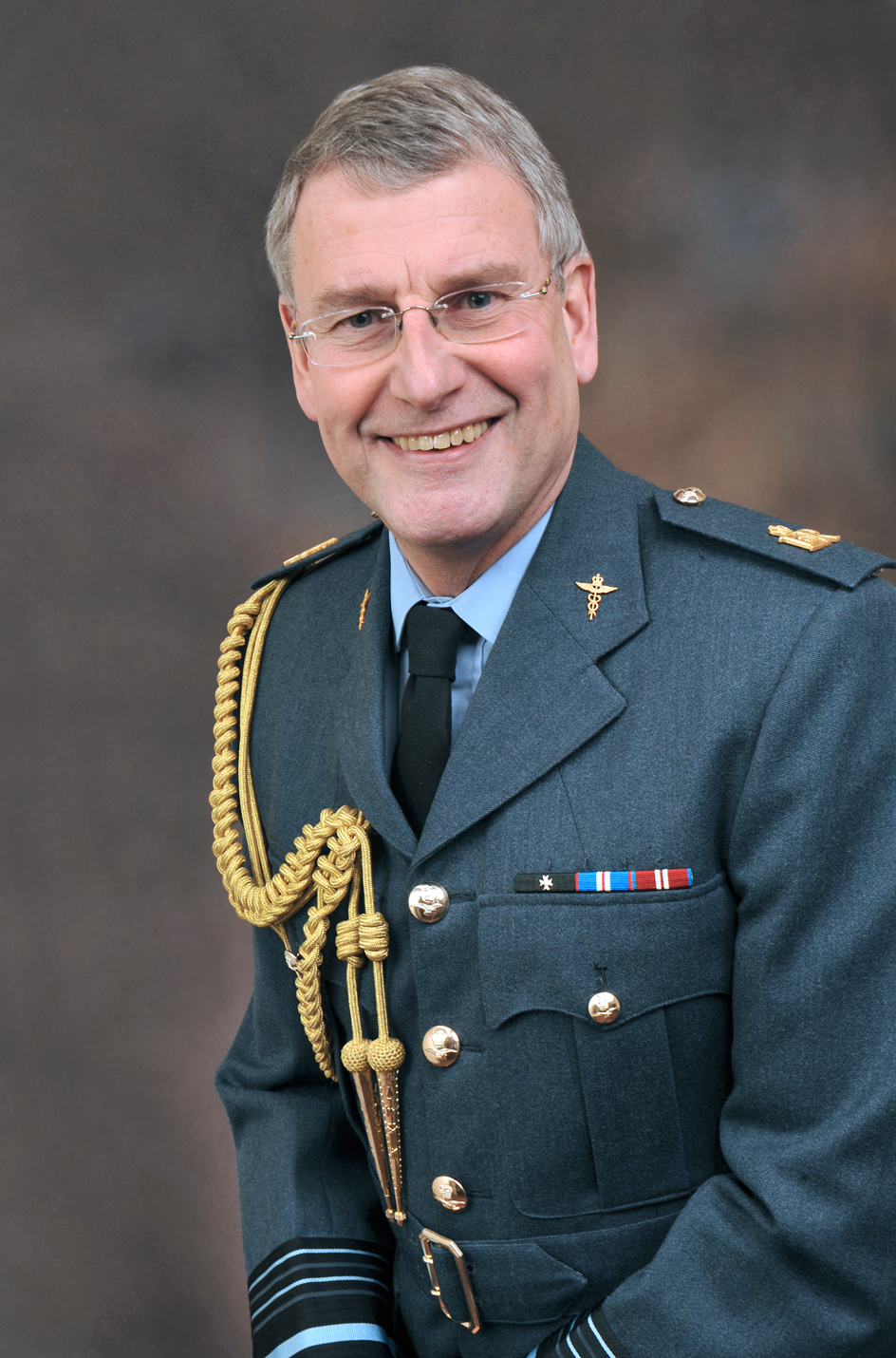
- Air Marshal Paul Evans in February 2013
- Born: Christopher Paul Anthony Evans; 1954 (age 71–72)
- Military career
- Allegiance: United Kingdom
- Branch: Royal Air Force
- Service years: 1975–2015
- Rank: Air Marshal
- Service number: 5203329
- Unit: RAF Medical Services
- Commands: Defence Medical Services (2012–2015)
- Awards: Companion of the Order of the Bath; Officer of the Venerable Order of Saint John

Air Marshal Christopher Paul Anthony Evans, CB, OStJ, QHP, FRAeS (born 1954) is a former senior Royal Air Force officer and medical doctor. He served as Surgeon General of the British Armed Forces from 2012 to 2015.

== Early life ==
Evans was born in 1954. He graduated from the Welsh National School of Medicine in 1978 Bachelor of Medicine, Bachelor of Surgery.

== Military career ==
On 18 November 1975, Evans was commissioned into the Medical Branch of the Royal Air Force as a pilot officer. He was given the service number 5203329. On 13 July 1978, he was promoted to flying officer, following his qualification as a medical doctor. On 1 August 1979, he was promoted to flight lieutenant. His first postings were as a junior medical officer at RAF Wyton and the RAF Hospitals at Ely, Cambridgeshire, Nocton Hall and RAF Halton. He was appointed a senior medical officer in 1983. This followed postings to RAF Leeming, RAF Coltishall and RAF Valley. He transferred from a short service to a regular commission on 3 May 1984. On 1 August 1984, he was promoted to squadron leader. In 1987, he studied for a Diploma in Aviation Medicine.

He then undertook a number of staff appointments. He was Command Flight Medical Officer at RAF Support Command, the Officer Commanding the medical wing of RAF Hospital Wegberg and then Medico-Legal Adviser to the Director General Medical Services (RAF). He was promoted to wing commander on 1 August 1992. He attended the RAF Staff College in 1996. He joined the Surgeon General’s Department as the Medical Officer responsible for clinical policy. He was promoted to group captain on 1 July 2002 as part of the half yearly promotions. He was then appointed Deputy Director responsible for Medical Policy and Plans in the Director General Medical Services (RAF)'s Directorate.

On 1 April 2003, he was appointed acting Director Healthcare within the Surgeon General’s Department. He attended the Royal College of Defence Studies in November 2004 He was promoted to air commodore on 1 January 2005 as part of the half yearly promotions. Following his promotion, he became the substantive Director Healthcare.

As of 2015, Evans was paid a salary of between £155,000 and £159,999 by the department, making him one of the 328 most highly paid people in the British public sector at that time.

== Personal life ==
Evans is a sprinter. He was the United Kingdom champion as a junior indoor junior athlete. He competed for Wales as a senior international. He is the current President of RAF Athletics.

== Honours and decorations ==
In November 2009, he was appointed Officer of the Venerable Order of St John (OStJ). He was appointed Companion of the Order of the Bath (CB) in the 2014 Birthday Honours. On 31 March 2016, he relinquished the appointment as Honorary Surgeon to the Queen (QHS).

Honour Ribbons:

- : Order of the Bath (CB)
- : Venerable Order of St John (OStJ)

Military offices
| Preceded by Philip Raffaelli | Surgeon General of the British Armed Forces; 2012 – 2015 | Succeeded by Alasdair Walker |
