= Alastair Reid (RAF officer) =

- Military career
- Allegiance: United Kingdom
- Branch: Royal Air Force
- Service years: 1993–present
- Rank: Air Vice-Marshal
- Unit: RAF Medical Services
- Awards: Companion of the Order of the Bath

Air Vice-Marshal Alastair Norman Crawford Reid, CB, QHP is a senior Royal Air Force officer and medical doctor.

== RAF career ==
Educated at the University of Glasgow, Reid served as general practitioner in the National Health Service before joining the Royal Air Force in 1993. He became Air Officer Medical Operations, No. 38 Group in April 2014, Head Medical Strategy, Policy and Personnel, Headquarters Surgeon General in June 2016 and Defence Medical Director, Headquarters Surgeon General in June 2018. Reid was acting Surgeon General after Lieutenant General Martin Bricknell.

He was appointed Companion of the Order of the Bath (CB) in the 2020 New Year Honours.

Military offices
Preceded by Martin Bricknell	Surgeon General of the British Armed Forces; 2019–2021	Succeeded by Timothy Hodgetts
