= Nigel Mills (RAF officer) =

British military doctor (1932–1991)

Sir Nigel Mills
- Born: 12 November 1932; Swanley, Kent
- Died: 18 October 1991 (aged 58)
- Relatives: Air Chief Marshal Sir George Mills (father)
- Military career
- Allegiance: United Kingdom
- Branch: Royal Air Force
- Service years: 1956–91
- Rank: Air Marshal
- Commands: Surgeon General of the British Armed Forces (1990–91); Director General Medical Services (Royal Air Force) (1987–90); RAF Medical Rehabilitation Unit (1982–83); RAF Institute of Community and Occupational Medicine (1979–82)
- Awards: Knight Commander of the Order of the British Empire

Air Marshal Sir Nigel Holroyd Mills, KBE, QHP, FRCGP, FRCP (12 November 1932 – 18 October 1991) was a British military doctor.

== Career ==
Mills was the son of Air Chief Marshal Sir George Mills. He was educated at Berkhamsted School and Middlesex Hospital Medical School. He was Director General Medical Services (Royal Air Force) from 1987 to 1990 and Surgeon General from 1990 to 1991.

Military offices
Preceded by	Surgeon General of the British Armed Forces; 1990–1991	Succeeded by Peter Beale
