= Philip Raffaelli =

Surgeon Vice-Admiral Philip Raffaelli CB CStJ QHP FRCP
- Born: 24 November 1955 (age 70); Kirkcaldy, Fife
- Military career
- Allegiance: United Kingdom
- Branch: Royal Navy
- Rank: Surgeon Vice-Admiral
- Awards: Companion of the Order of the Bath

Surgeon Vice-Admiral Philip Iain Raffaelli CB CStJ QHP FRCP (born 24 November 1955 in Kirkcaldy, Fife) is a British general practitioner and Royal Naval Medical Officer. Raffaelli served as Surgeon General of the British Armed Forces until 2012.

== Military career ==
Raffaelli joined the Royal Navy as a cadet in 1976, while studying medicine at Edinburgh Medical School. Raffaelli joined the Royal Navy Submarine Service and worked as a medical officer from 1979, working for a time on submarines. In 2007, he became the head of the Royal Navy Medical Service, the Medical Director General (Naval), as Surgeon Rear-Admiral, before assuming the position of Surgeon-General on 22 December 2009, taking over from Lieutenant-General Louis Lillywhite.

== Honours ==
Raffaelli was appointed as an Honorary Physician to the Queen in 2005, and later as a Fellow of the Royal College of Physicians. He is also a Governor of the University Hospitals Birmingham NHS Foundation Trust, and an appointee to the court of the London School of Hygiene & Tropical Medicine

| Companion of the Order of the Bath (CB) | 2012 Birthday Honours |
| Commander of the Order of St John | 2009 |
| Queen Elizabeth II Golden Jubilee Medal | 2002 |
| Queen Elizabeth II Diamond Jubilee Medal | 2012 |

Military offices
| Preceded by Louis Lillywhite | Surgeon General of the British Armed Forces; 2009 – 2012 | Succeeded by Paul Evans |
