= Philip McNee =

Major General Philip McNee
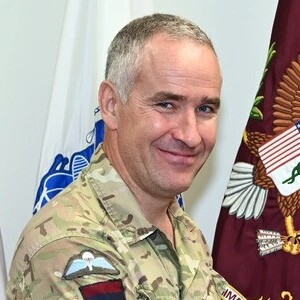
- McNee in 2024
- Military career
- Allegiance: United Kingdom
- Branch: British Army
- Service years: 1983–present
- Rank: Major General
- Service number: 554203
- Unit: Army Medical Services
- Conflicts: War in Afghanistan

Major General Philip A. J. McNee is a senior British Army officer and medical doctor, who served as Surgeon General of the United Kingdom Armed Forces from May 2024 to July 2025.

== Military career ==
McNee was commissioned into the Royal Army Medical Corps on 18 September 1998. He worked as a radiologist. He was promoted to major on 18 September 2003. He served as commanding officer of 16 Medical Regiment. He was promoted to brigadier on 30 June 2017. He became head of the Medical Operational Capability team for Defence Medical Services. It was announced in November 2023 that he would become Surgeon General of the United Kingdom Armed Forces with effect from May 2024.

On 20 May 2024, McNee was appointed an Honorary Physician to the King (KHP), from which position he stepped down in August 2025, as he resigned as Surgeon General.

On 7 April 2025, he was appointed Officer of the Venerable Order of St John.

Military offices
| Preceded by Timothy Hodgetts | Surgeon General of the British Armed Forces; 2024–2025 | Succeeded by Phil Carter |
