= Surgeon-General (United Kingdom) =

Senior uniformed medical officer

Surgeon General of the United Kingdom Armed Forces
- Ministry of Defence tri-Service Badge
- Incumbent; Phil Carter since August 2025
- Defence Medical Services
- Website: Defence Medical Services

The title Surgeon-General has been used for different purposes at different times in the United Kingdom. Initially it was the designation of a director of the Army's medical services. Subsequently it was a senior rank in the Army Medical Department (and, briefly, in the Royal Navy). Having lapsed after the First World War, the title was again revived in the late twentieth century for the most senior uniformed medical officer in the British Armed Forces. Currently, it pertains to a senior uniformed medical officer, working under the Director General Defence Medical Services.

== Army ==
=== Office ===
With the formation of a standing army in the 1660s, there was a need for greater co-ordination of the provision of medical services (which had previously been arranged on a more ad hoc basis by individual regiments). In Ireland, a Physician-General was appointed in 1660, and a Surgeon-General in 1661. In 1664 the King's Physician-in-Ordinary and Serjeant Surgeon took on a similar role informally, before being appointed 'Surgeon General of all the Forces in England and Wales', in 1664. In 1685, a Physician-General was also appointed; together, they directed the Army's medical services. These two offices lapsed following the establishment of the Army Medical Department in 1810.

=== Rank ===
In 1873, following the abolition of the regimental system of appointing and supervising medical officers, the title of surgeon-general was used for the highest rank of medical officers in Army Medical Department (replacing that of inspector-general of hospitals and signifying their broader authority). The rank of deputy surgeon-general was also introduced, although it was redesignated surgeon-colonel from 7 August 1891. In 1918, the title again went into abeyance when medical officers were given military rank: surgeon-general was redesignated as the standard Army rank of major-general, except for the most senior surgeon-general, who was redesignated a lieutenant-general.

== Royal Navy ==
In July 1911, the titles of inspector-general of hospitals and fleets and deputy inspector-general of hospitals and fleets were replaced by surgeon-general, Royal Navy, and deputy surgeon-general, Royal Navy, respectively.

In November 1918, the titles of officers of the medical, accountant and naval instructor branches of the Navy were revised "in order to indicate more clearly their status as Officers of [His] Majesty's Naval Service"; thenceforward surgeons-general were styled surgeon rear-admirals and deputy surgeons-general were styled surgeon captains.

== Defence Medical Services ==
In 1985, as part of a move toward greater co-ordination between the medical departments of the three Armed Services, the post of Surgeon General was created anew for the most senior uniformed medical officer in the British Armed Forces (the first holder being Sir Cameron Moffat, who served concurrently as Director General Army Medical Services).

Latterly, the role was described as "professional head of Defence Medical Services and the Defence Authority for end to end Defence healthcare and medical operational capability". It had always been held by a three-star military medical officer; but in July 2019 a civilian was appointed to the role for the first time, Peter Homa, whose job title was Director General Defence Medical Services (DGDMS). Under Peter Homa as DGDMS, Air Vice-Marshal Alastair Reid (who had been appointed to the two-star position of Defence Medical Director in 2018) was designated Surgeon-General.

Subsequently, a serving military medical officer, Air Marshal Clare Walton, was appointed to the three-star post of Director General Defence Medical Services, retitled Chief of Defence Medical on the creation of the Defence Medical Command.The post of Surgeon General has remained a two-star position.

As of 2024, the responsibilities of the DGDMS include:

- being the functional lead for medical and healthcare within the Ministry of Defence
- leading the transformation of the Defence Medical Services
- ensuring all UK Armed Forces personnel receive safe, efficient and effective healthcare.

Following the publication of the 2025 Strategic Defence Review the responsibilities of the Surgeon General of the UK Armed Forces were listed as:

- Providing specialist health and medical support advice to the Military Strategic Headquarters on behalf of the Director General of the Defence Medical Services.
- Force Design within the Defence Medical Services, ensuring the readiness of the medical capability supporting the Armed Forces.
- Directing medical research, medical innovation, and continuous quality improvement in Defence.
- Coordinating international technical engagement with medical partners across NATO and the UK’s broader alliances.

Previously, the responsibilities of the UK Surgeon General had been listed as:

- maximising the number of Service Personnel fit for task through securing appropriate levels of health
- optimising the health and healthcare of deployed Population at Risk throughout the Operational Patient Care Pathway.
- senior technical authority for Defence medicine, including prevention, detection, treatment, and recovery from the full spectrum of illness and injury.
- strategic advice on Defence medical doctrine, concepts, capability planning, force development and lessons.
- directing medical research and medical innovation in Defence, *co-ordination of strategic DMS Defence Engagement and directing continuous clinical quality improvement in Defence.

== List of Surgeons-General since 1985 ==
For Directors General Defence Medical Services, see Defence Medical Services#List of Directors General since 2019

Rank	Name	Post-nominals	Years in office
Lieutenant General	Sir Cameron Moffat	KBE, CStJ, QHS, FRCS	1985–1988
Surgeon Vice Admiral	Sir Godfrey Milton-Thompson	KBE, QHP, FRCP	1988–1990
Air Marshal	Sir Nigel Mills	KBE, QHP, FRCGP, FRCP	1990–1991
Lieutenant General	Sir Peter Beale	KBE, QHP, FRCP	1991–1994
Surgeon Vice Admiral	Anthony Revell	CB, QHS, FRCA	1994–1997
Air Marshal	Sir John Baird	KBE, DL, QHS, FRAeS, FRCPE	1997–2000
Lieutenant General	Robert Menzies	CB, OBE, QHS	2000–2002
Surgeon Vice Admiral	Ian Jenkins	CB, CVO, CStJ, QHS, FRCS	2002–2006
Lieutenant General	Louis Lillywhite	CB, MBE, CStJ, QHP, FRCP	2006–2009
Surgeon Vice Admiral	Philip Raffaelli	CB, CStJ, QHP, FRCP	2009–2012
Air Marshal	Paul Evans	CB, OStJ, QHP	2012–2015
Surgeon Vice Admiral	Alasdair Walker	CB, OBE, OStJ, QHS, FRCS	2015–2018
Air Vice-Marshal	Richard Broadbridge	CB, MStJ, QHS, FRAeS, FRCGP	2017 (acting)
Lieutenant General	Martin Bricknell	CB, QHP	2018–2019
Air Vice-Marshal	Alastair Reid	CB, QHP	2019–2021
Major General	Timothy Hodgetts	CB, CBE, QHS, DL	2021–2024
Major General	Philip McNee	KHP	2024–2025
Major General	Phil Carter	KHP OStJ	2025–
