= Fellow of the Academy of Medical Sciences =

UK medical sciences award

Fellowship of the Academy of Medical Sciences (FMedSci)
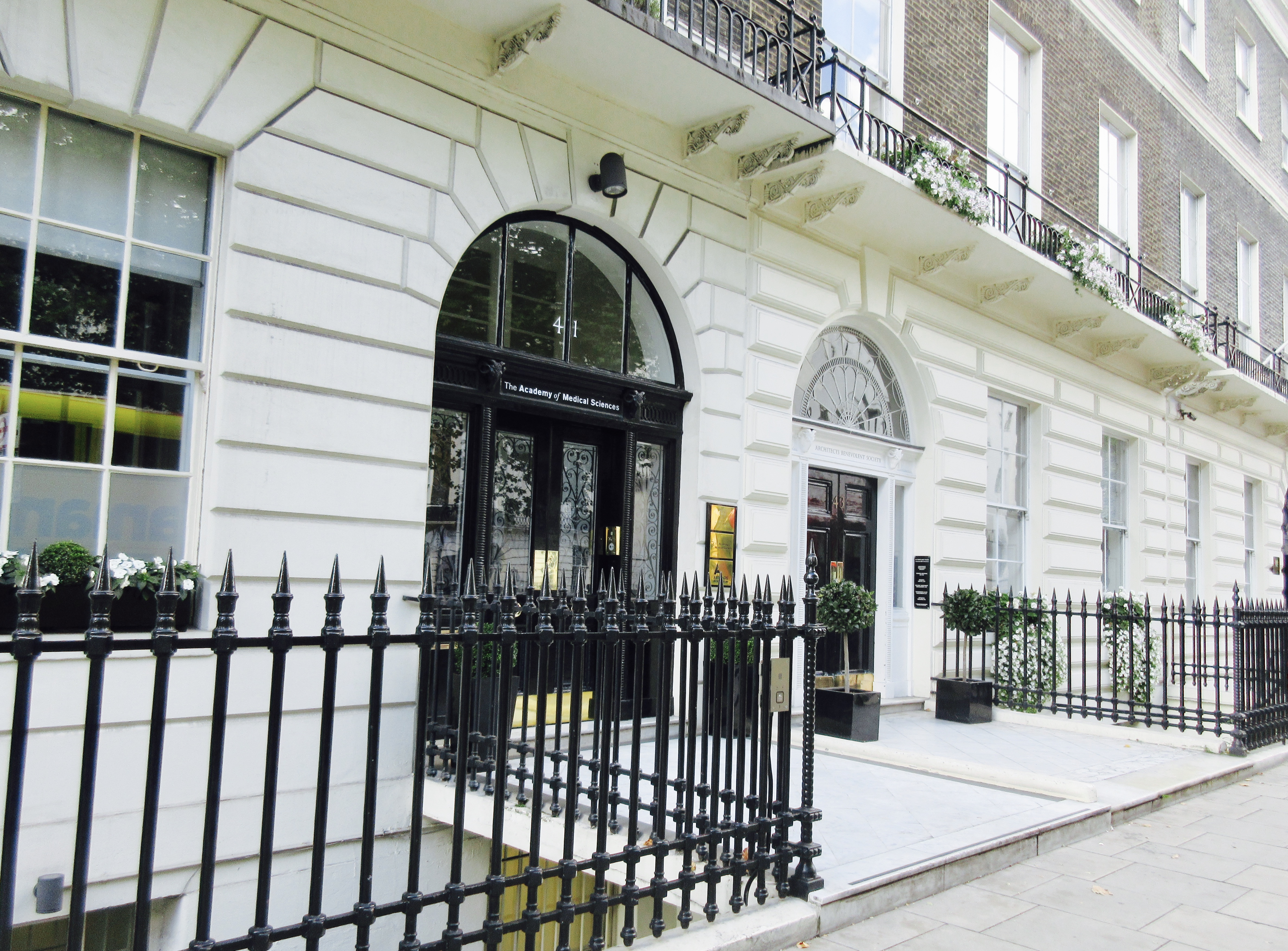
- The Academy of Medical Sciences HQ, 41 Portland Place, London
- Awarded for: excellence of science, contribution to medicine and society and a range of achievement
- Sponsored by: Academy of Medical Sciences
- Date: 1998
- Location: London, United Kingdom
- Country: United Kingdom
- Total no. of Fellows: 1261
- Website: acmedsci.ac.uk/fellows

Fellowship of the Academy of Medical Sciences (FMedSci) is an award for medical scientists who are judged by the UK Academy of Medical Sciences for the "excellence of their science, their contribution to medicine and society and the range of their achievements".

== Fellowship ==
Fellows are entitled to use the post-nominal letters FMedSci; see Category:Fellows of the Academy of Medical Sciences (United Kingdom) for examples of fellows. Honorary Fellowship is awarded to exceptional individuals who enhance the Academy’s distinction through outstanding contributions to medical science or healthcare, but who do not meet the criteria for Ordinary Fellowship. Honorary Fellows are also entitled to use the post-nominal letters FMedSci.
