= General Menzies =

General Menzies may refer to:

- Charles Menzies (Royal Marines officer) (1783–1866), Royal Marines general
- Robert Menzies (British Army officer) (born 1944), British Army lieutenant general
- Stewart Menzies (1890–1968), British Army major general
