= Cameron Moffat =

British Army officer and doctor (1929–2014)

Lieutenant-General Sir William Cameron Moffat KBE CStJ FRCS (8 September 1929 – 29 June 2014) was a British Army officer and doctor. He served as Director General Army Medical Services from 1984 to 1987, and Surgeon General from 1985 to 1987. He later served as chief medical adviser to the British Red Cross.

== Early life ==
Moffat was born in 1929. During World War II, he was evacuated to the Isle of Bute. In 1947, he matriculated in the University of Glasgow to study medicine. He graduated Bachelor of Medicine, Bachelor of Surgery (MB BCh) in 1951.

== Military career ==
As part of National Service, Moffat was commissioned into the Royal Army Medical Corps, British Army, on 11 October 1954 as a lieutenant. On 8 December 1954, he transferred from the National Service List to a short service commission with seniority in the rank of lieutenant from 1 August 1952. He was promoted to captain on 8 December 1954 with seniority from 1 August 1953. On 1 October 1959, he transferred to a regular commission in the rank of lieutenant with seniority from 4 August 1953. He was promoted to captain on the same day with seniority in that rank from 4 August 1954. He was promoted to major on 4 August 1961, and to lieutenant colonel on 4 August 1966.

He was promoted to colonel on 4 August 1975, and to brigadier on 7 April 1981. He was promoted to major-general on 1 December 1983. In 1984, he was appointed Director General Army Medical Services, the head of the British Army's medical wing. He was promoted to lieutenant-general on 28 January 1985. In 1985, he was appointed Surgeon General, therefore becoming the senior medical officer of the British Armed Forces, and director of the Defence Medical Services.

He retired from the British Army on 27 February 1988.

== Later life ==
Moffat died on 29 June 2014.

== Honours and decorations ==
In the 1976 Queen's Birthday Honours, Moffat was appointed Officer of the Order of the British Empire (OBE). He was appointed Honorary Surgeon to The Queen (QHS) on 30 November 1983. He was promoted to Knight Commander of the Order of the British Empire (KBE) in the 1985 New Year Honours. In April 1985, he was appointed Commander of the Order of St John (CStJ). His tenure as Honorary Surgeon to The Queen ended on 26 February 1988.

On 19 June 1991, he was awarded an honorary Doctor of Science degree by the University of Glasgow. In 1994, he was awarded the Queen's Badge of Honour, the highest honour awarded for service to the British Red Cross.
