= Andrew Semple (physician) =

Scottish doctor

- Born: Andrew Best Semple; 3 May 1912; Glasgow, Scotland
- Died: 15 November 2013 (aged 101); Northamptonshire
- Education: Allan Glen's School
- Alma mater: University of Glasgow (MD)
- Known for: Public health work

Medical Officer of Health for Liverpool
- In office 1953 – 1974

Honorary Physician to Queen Elizabeth II
- In office 1963 – 1965
- Preceded by: John Weir
- Succeeded by: Frederick Charles Hurrell
- Military career
- Allegiance: United Kingdom
- Service: Royal Naval Reserve
- Rank: Surgeon commander
- Unit: Second Submarine Flotilla
- War: World War II

Andrew Best Semple (3 May 1912 in Glasgow – 15 November 2013 in Northamptonshire) was a Scottish doctor who specialised in public health. He served as honorary physician to the Queen, and was the Medical Officer of Health for Liverpool from 1953 to 1974.

== Biography ==
Semple was born in Glasgow and educated at Allan Glen's School. He graduated in medicine from the University of Glasgow in 1934 and specialised in public health, serving as an assistant Medical Officer of Health in Paisley, Portsmouth and Blackburn. During the Second World War he served in the Royal Naval Reserve, electing for active service in the Second Submarine Flotilla, where he gained the rank of surgeon commander. While in this role, he noticed that submariners struggled to adjust their eyesight while moving between brightly lit interiors to the dark observation tower. He proposed introducing amber lights to soften this transition, which was implemented at once. From 1963 to 1965 Semple was appointed as honorary physician to the Queen.

He was particularly interested in tackling the problems of undiagnosed tuberculosis and poor housing in the city. He introduced one of the UK's first smokeless zones under the Clean Air Act 1956. Under his guidance Liverpool became one of the first local authorities to employ mental welfare officers, and he helped to establish an employment unit for adolescents with learning difficulties. He was a member of the Royal College of Physicians and worked closely with the World Health Organization.

Semple died on 15 November 2013, aged 101.
