= Peter Beale (disambiguation) =

Peter Beale is a character from EastEnders from 1993 onwards.

Peter Beale may also refer to:

- Pete Beale, character from EastEnders from 1985 to 1993
- Peter Beale (British Army officer) (1934–2026), Surgeon General of the British Armed Forces, 1991–1994
