= George Stewart Beatson =

Surgeon-general of the British Army (1814–1874)

George Stewart Beatson CB
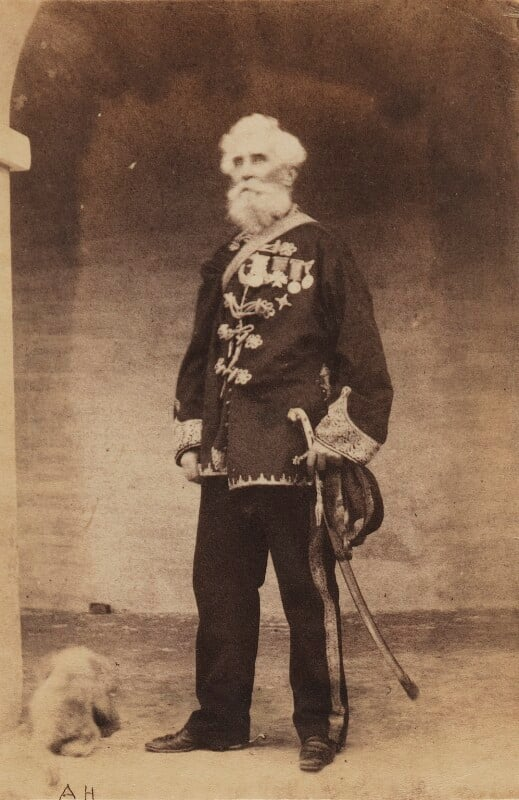
- Beatson in the 1860s
- Born: 22 May 1814; Greenock, Inverclyde, Scotland
- Died: 7 June 1874 (aged 60); Shimla, Himachal Pradesh, British India
- Education: University of Glasgow (1836)
- Occupation: Physician

George Stewart Beatson CB (22 May 1814 – 7 June 1874) was a Scottish physician who was surgeon-general of the British Army and Honorary Physician to the Queen.

== Biography ==
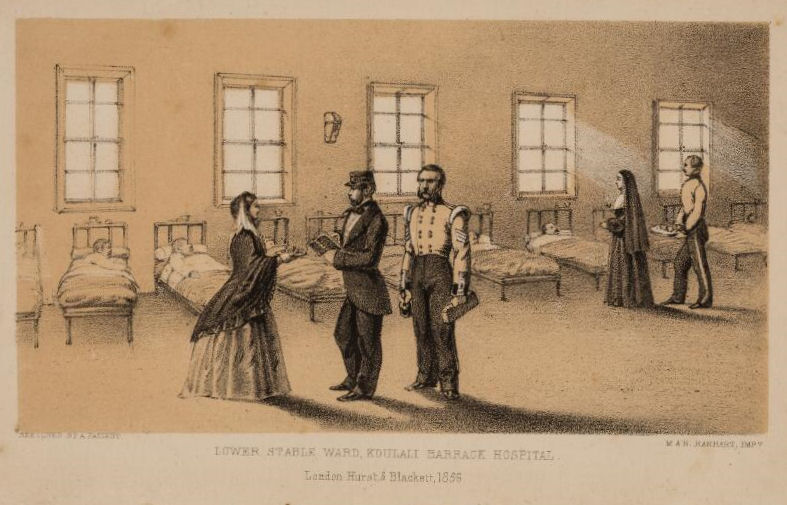
Lithograph of the Lower Stable Ward at Koulali Barrack Hospital in the Crimea (1856)

Beatson graduated in arts and medicine from the University of Glasgow, earning an M.D. in 1836. In 1838, Beatson joined the army medical department, and did duty on the staff in Ceylon from 1839 to 1851. He was surgeon to the 51st Foot in the second Burmese war, and subsequently served as PMO at Koulali Hospital in Turkey during the Crimean War, where he rendered valuable services in the organisation of the hospitals at Smyrna.

After serving as deputy inspector-general in the Ionian Islands and Madras, he became surgeon-general in 1863, and was appointed principal medical officer of European troops in India, an appointment which he held for the customary five years. For the next three years he was in medical charge of the Royal Victoria Hospital, Netley; and in 1871 was appointed principal medical officer in India for the second time.

He was appointed a Companion of the Most Honourable Order of the Bath in 1869. He died suddenly at Knollswood, Shimla on 7 June 1874.

Beatson, who was an Honorary Physician to the Queen, was accounted one of the ablest officers in the army medical service, but it is in the records of the department, at home and in India, rather than in professional literature, that his labours will be noticed.

== Family ==
Beatson married Mary Jane Cochrane. They had four sons who had distinguished military careers and one daughter:

- Lt.-Col. Dr Sir George Thomas Beatson KCB KBE (31 August 1848 – 16 February 1933)
- Col. Charles Henry Beatson CB (27 March 1851 – 20 January 1938)
- Col. Finlay Cochrane Beatson CB (2 August 1855 – 20 August 1933)
- Col. William John Arnold Beatson (9 August 1857 – 31 December 1908)
- Florence Frederica Hamilton Beatson (6 December 1859 – 17 February 1936)

Beatson married secondly Elizabeth Adams Hoyes. They had one daughter:

- Elizabeth Mary Stewart Beatson (September 1871 – 10 April 1958)
