= Portland Place =

Historic thoroughfare in the Marylebone district of London, England

Coordinates: 51.52023°N 0.14499°W

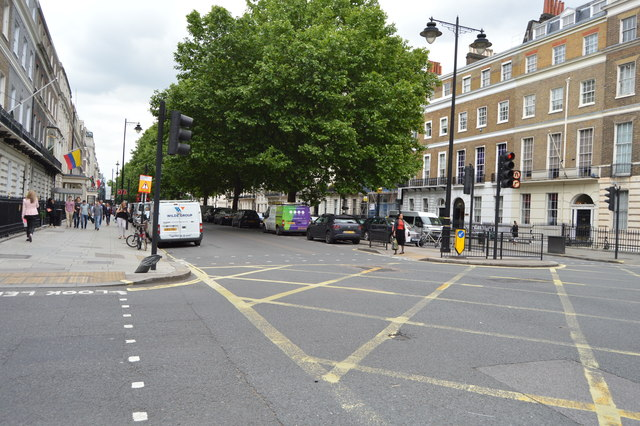
- Portland Place wide street

- Location within City of Westminster
- Namesake: William Cavendish-Bentinck, 3rd Duke of Portland
- Maintained by: Transport for London
- Location: London, United Kingdom
- Postal code: W1
- Nearest Tube station: Oxford Circus

Other
- Known for: BBC Broadcasting House

Portland Place is a street in the Marylebone district of central London. Named after the 3rd Duke of Portland, the unusually wide street is home to the BBC's headquarters Broadcasting House, the Chinese and Polish embassies, the Royal Institute of British Architects and numerous residential mansion blocks.

== History and topography ==
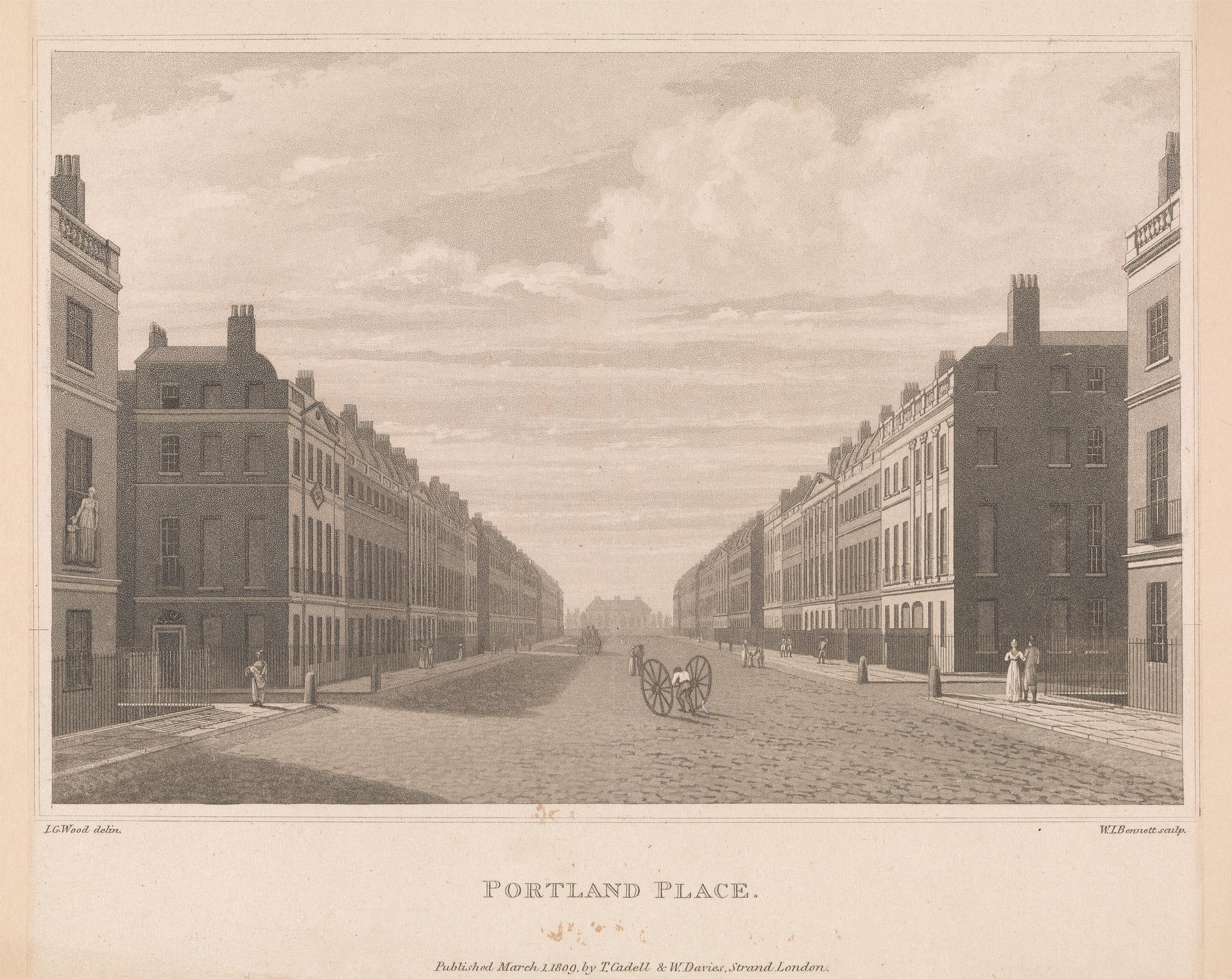
Portland Place c.1809

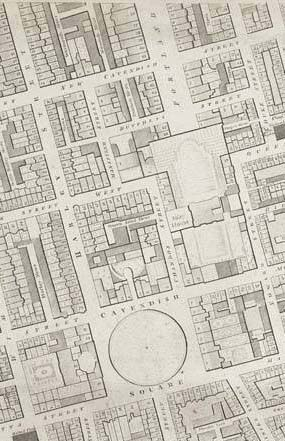
Portland Place is the wide street at the top of this 1790s map. At that time it terminated abruptly to the south at the gardens of Foley House.

The street was laid out by the brothers Robert and James Adam for the Duke of Portland in the 1770s and originally ran north from the gardens of a detached mansion called Foley House. It was said that the exceptional width of the street was conditioned by the Duke's obligation to his tenant, Lord Foley, that his views to the north would not be obscured.

In the early 19th century, Portland Place was incorporated into the royal route from Carlton House to Regent's Park via Langham Place, developed for the Prince Regent by John Nash. The street is unusually wide for central London (33 metres / 34 m). The ambitious plans included a third circus to complement Piccadilly Circus and Oxford Circus known as Regent's Circus; the remains of this plan survive today in the wide space surrounding the street's junction with Marylebone Road. The Spanish Embassy was located at Portland Place from 1819 to 1821.

Portland Place still contains many of the spacious Georgian terraced houses built by the Adams, as well as some early 20th century buildings and a few post World War II bombing structures.

In administrative terms, Portland Place lies within the City of Westminster's Marylebone High Street Ward as well as the Harley Street Conservation Area.

== Residents and buildings ==
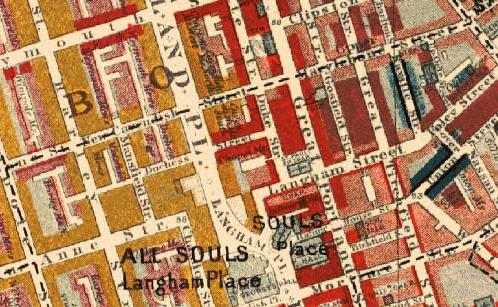
Langham Place in Charles Booth's 1889 map was a short road which connected Portland Place to Upper Regent Street.

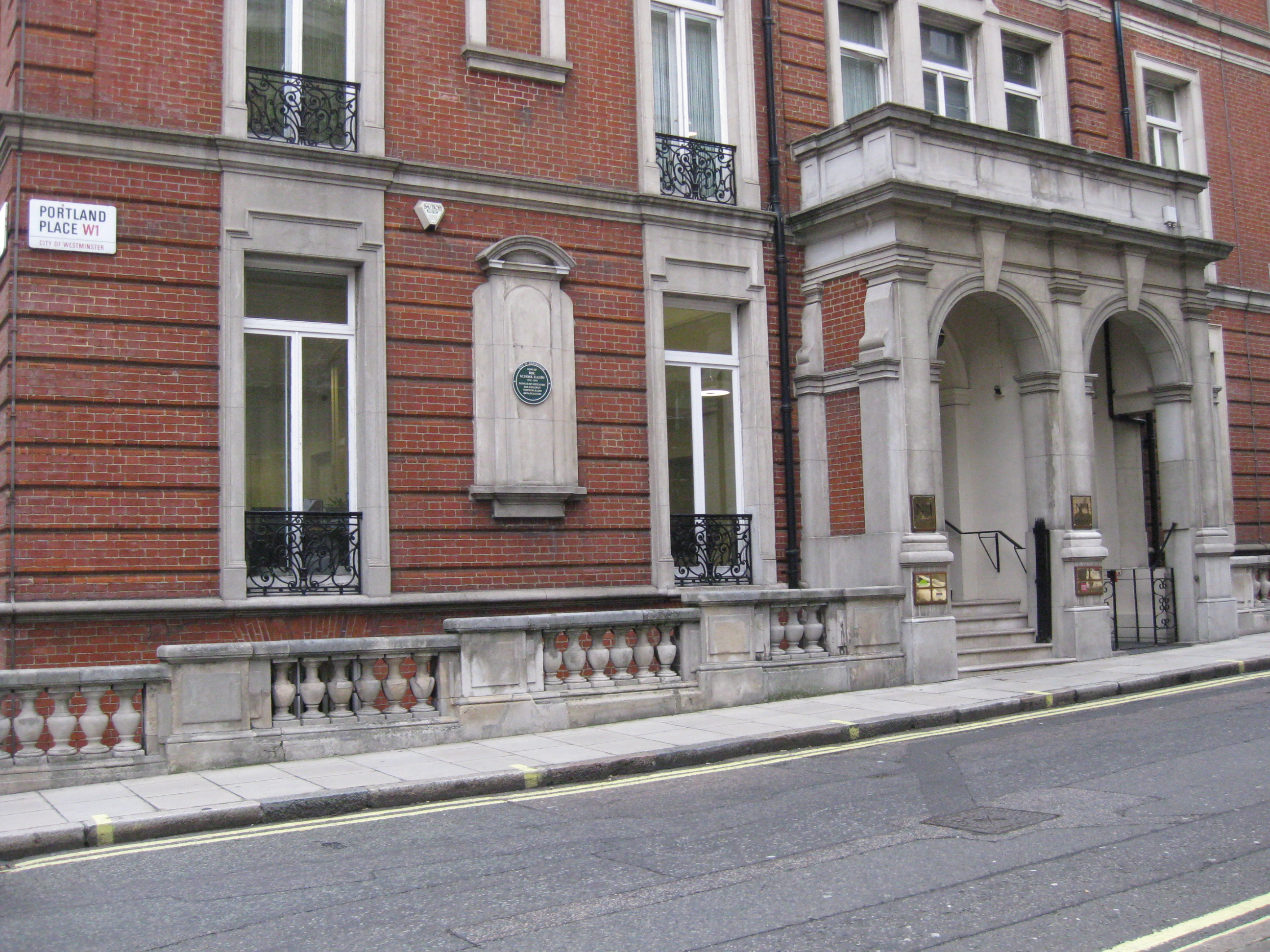
Number 1, Portland Place, Westminster, London

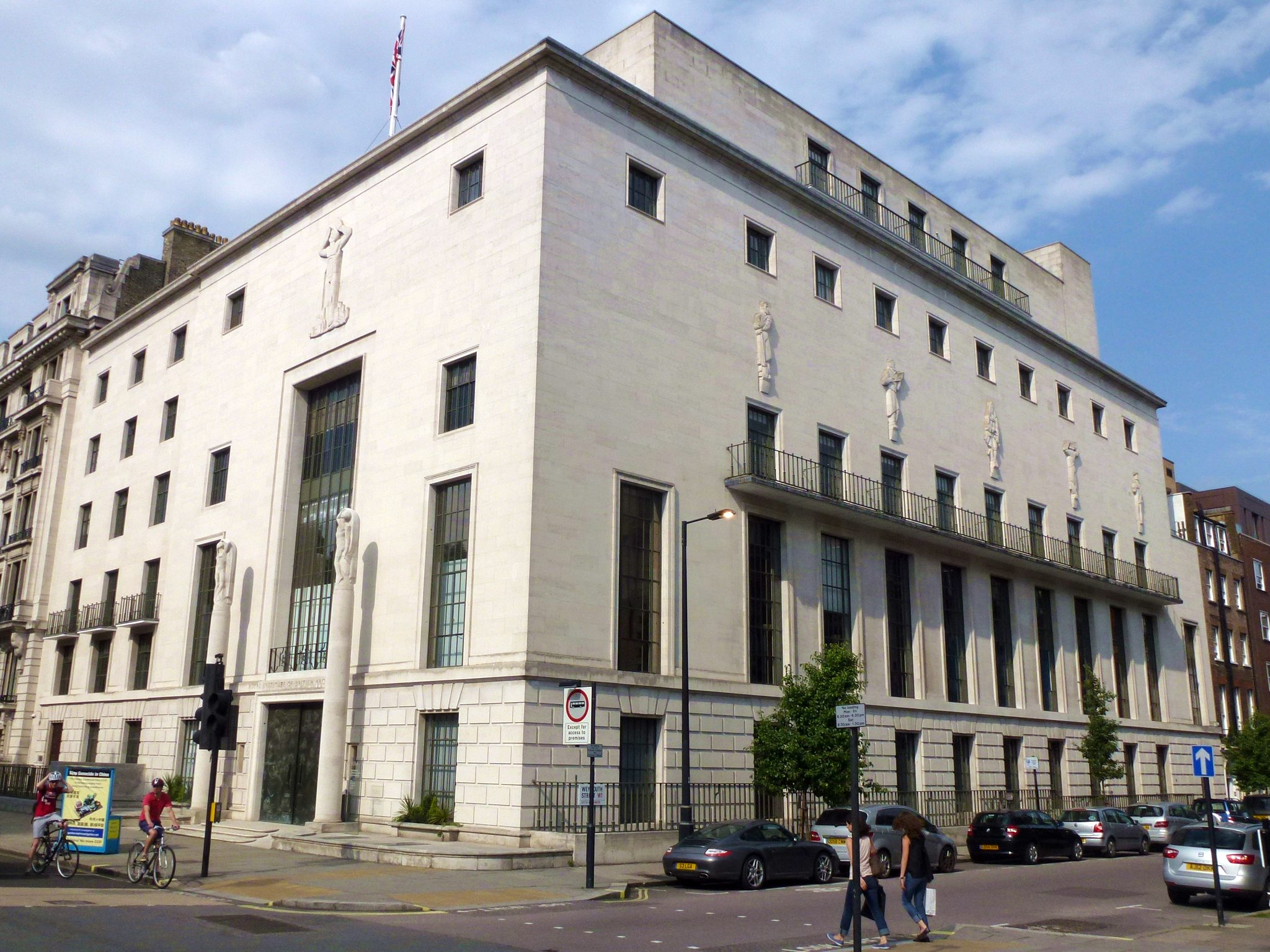
The Royal Institute of British Architects headquarters, a 1930s Grade II* listed building designed by architect George Grey Wornum, at 66 Portland Place in August 2012.

While most is high quality residential in a close local community, many of the houses are now occupied by company headquarters, professional bodies, embassies and charities (including Arthritis Research UK and the Royal Air Force Benevolent Fund). The landmark headquarters of the Royal Institute of British Architects sits at 66 Portland Place directly opposite the Chinese embassy; for years practitioners of Falun Gong have mounted a silent protest in front of the former and facing the latter. Other foreign diplomatic institutions include the Polish Embassy, a Portuguese consulate, the High Commission of Kenya, the Swedish Ambassador's Residence and the Colombian Consulate. In addition, Portland Place remains a fashionable address with some very exclusive blocks of mansion flats. Number 1 houses the Institution of Chemical Engineers, number 41 the Academy of Medical Sciences, number 23 houses the Nursing and Midwifery Council, number 67 the Royal Air Force Benevolent Fund and number 76 the Institute of Physics. The Institute of Physics building replaced two earlier Georgian terrace houses, one of which – number 76 – was the home of John Buchan, the author and politician who lived there from 1912 until 1919, which resulted in Portland Place being the London home of Richard Hannay, the hero of Buchan's most famous novel "The Thirty-Nine Steps".

Its northern end opens into Nash's elegant stucco semicircular Park Crescent, which in turn leads on to Park Square and Regent's Park. There are two landmark buildings at the south end of the street, although both are technically in Langham Place: the grand late Victorian Langham Hotel, and Broadcasting House. Langham Place is a short road which connects Portland Place to Upper Regent Street, although on the ground they all appear to be one street.

A Grade II listed memorial to Quintin and Alice Hogg erected in 1906 stands opposite Broadcasting House at the south end of Portland Place.

Sir William Moore, Surgeon-General and Honorary Physician to Queen Victoria lived at 15 Portland Place.

There are a number of international independent schools on Portland Place, including Abercorn Upper School, Queens College and the Southbank International School.

Hundred Guineas Club, an exclusive gay club frequented by Prince Albert Victor was located on Portland Place. It is referred to as "Inslip's Club" in the 1881 non-fiction novel The Sins of the Cities of the Plain.

== Literary references ==
- Portland Place was the home of Jane Gamble, the character on whom Henry James based his novel The Portrait of a Lady.
- Jane Gamble was also the real-life subject of My Courtship and its Consequences by Henry Wikoff.
- Portland Place was the London address of, first, Adam Verver and his daughter Maggie Verver, and then (beginning with Volume One, Book Three, Chapter Four) of Prince Amerigo and his wife, the former Maggie Verver, in the last complete major novel by Henry James, The Golden Bowl.
- Portland Place is the home of Richard Hannay in John Buchan's novel The Thirty-nine Steps.
- Portland Place is the home of Stephen Jones in H. P. Lovecraft's short story "The Horror in the Museum".
- Portland Place is featured in Daphne du Maurier's novel Julius.
- Portland Place is the location of the private hotel where Valeria and Eustace stay after their truncated honeymoon in The Law and the Lady by Wilkie Collins.
- Portland Place is the address of the wealthy brothers in Mark Twain's short story "The Million Pound Note".
- Portland Place is a metaphor for Septimus Warren Smith's view of the world as a strange but wonderful place in Virginia Woolf's novel Mrs Dalloway.
- In Terry Pratchett and Neil Gaiman's Good Omens, the angel Aziraphale learned to dance the gavotte in a "discreet gentleman's club" in Portland Place, becoming the first and only angel who dances (on the head of a pin or otherwise).

== See also ==
- List of eponymous roads in London

== Bibliography ==
Georgian London (1945) by Sir John Summerson ISBN 0-7126-2095-8

Philip Temple, Colin Thom, Andrew Saint (2017) Survey of London: South-East Marylebone Volumes 51 and 52, Yale University Press, pp. 944

Edward Walford (1878) 'Oxford Street and its northern tributaries: Part 2 of 2', in Old and New London: Volume 4, pp. 441–467
