= Peter Beale (British Army officer) =

British Army general (1934–2026)

Lieutenant-General Sir Peter Beale KBE FRCP
- Born: 18 March 1934; Romford, London, England
- Died: 15 April 2026 (aged 92)
- Relatives: Sir Simon Russell Beale (son)
- Military career
- Allegiance: United Kingdom
- Branch: British Army
- Service years: 1960–1994
- Rank: Lieutenant-General
- Service number: 465344
- Awards: Knight Commander of the Order of the British Empire; Commander of the Venerable Order of Saint John
- Other work: Chief Medical Adviser to the British Red Cross

Lieutenant-General Sir Peter John Beale, KBE, FRCP (18 March 1934 – 15 April 2026) was a British military physician. He was the Surgeon-General of the British Armed Forces from 1991 to 1994. He also served as the Chief Medical Adviser to the British Red Cross from 1994 to 2000.

== Early life ==
Beale was born in Romford, London, England on 18 March 1934, to Basil and Eileen Beale. He was educated at St Paul's Cathedral School, a Private preparatory school in the City of London, and on a music scholarship at Felsted School, a public school in Felsted, Essex. Following his preclinical studies, he received a Bachelor of Arts from Gonville and Caius College, University of Cambridge, which he attended as a choral scholar. In 1958, he qualified by graduating Bachelor of Medicine, Bachelor of Surgery from Westminster Hospital Medical School.

== Military career ==
On 7 June 1960, as part of National Service, Beale was commissioned into the Royal Army Medical Corps as a lieutenant. He was given the service number 465344. On 8 July 1960, he transferred from the national service list to a short service commission. He was given seniority in the rank of lieutenant from 26 October 1959, promoted to captain on 26 October 1960, and was the Regimental Medical Officer of 34 Light Anti Aircraft Regiment, Royal Artillery from 1960 to 1963. He transferred to a regular commission on 1 May 1963, was given seniority in the rank of captain from 26 October 1959, and was promoted to major on 26 October 1964. In 1971, having completed his medical training in the form of attaining Membership of the Royal College of Physicians, he was made an army consultant physician. He was promoted to lieutenant colonel on 26 October 1972.

Beale became commander of the medical force attached to the 2nd Division in 1981. He was promoted to colonel on 1 April 1982, by which point he had been elected to Fellowship of the Royal College of Physicians and attained a Diploma in Tropical Medicine and Hygiene. He was appointed Commander Medical, I Corps in 1984, and was promoted to brigadier on 28 January 1985 with seniority from 26 October 1984. He was appointed Commander Medical, United Kingdom Land Forces in 1987, and promoted to major general on 30 November, He served as Director General Army Medical Services from 1990 to 1993. and appointed Honorary Physician to the Queen on 21 December that same year.

He was promoted to lieutenant general on 1 October 1991, and served as Surgeon General of the British Armed Forces from 1991 to 1994.

He was appointed a Commander of the Venerable Order of Saint John in the 1992 New Year Honours, despite having no prior connection with the Order or with St John Ambulance.

He was created a Knight Commander of the Order of the British Empire. Beale retired from the British Army on 1 October 1994.

== Later life ==
Upon leaving the British Army, Beale joined the British Red Cross as their Chief Medical Adviser. He held the post from 1994 to 2000. He was president of the Old Felstedian Society between 1998 and 2001, and the Army Officers Golf Society from 2001 to 2005.

== Personal life and death ==
In 1959, Beale married Julia Mary Winter, a fellow doctor. Together they had four sons and two daughters. One of the daughters predeceased her father. One of their sons is the actor Sir Simon Russell Beale. In 2001, he married for a second time to Mary Elisabeth Williams, who has a daughter.

Beale died from complications of surgery on 15 April 2026, at the age of 92.

Military offices
Preceded by Nigel Mills	Surgeon General of the British Armed Forces; 1991–1994	Succeeded by Anthony Revell
