= George Mills (RAF officer) =

Royal Air Force Air Chief Marshal (1902–1971)

Sir George Holroyd Mills
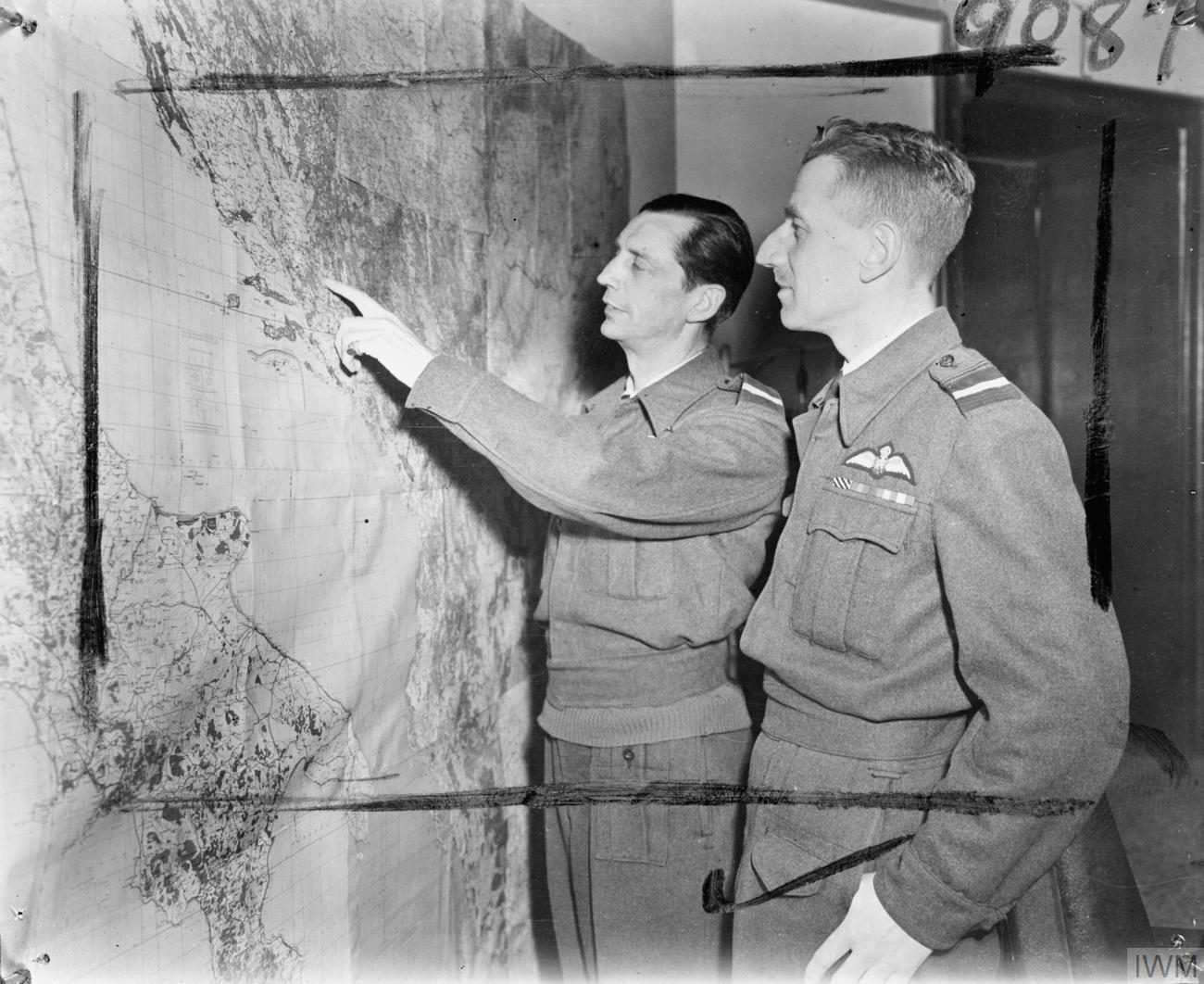
- Air Vice Marshal Elliot, the former Air Officer Commanding the Balkan Air Force (left), gives the latest information regarding Balkan operations to his successor, Air Vice Marshal Mills at BAF Headquarters, Bari, Italy, 1945
- Born: 26 March 1902; Dartford, Kent
- Died: 14 April 1971 (aged 69); Hillingdon, London
- Military career
- Allegiance: United Kingdom
- Branch: Royal Air Force
- Service years: 1920–1962
- Rank: Air Chief Marshal
- Commands: Allied Air Forces Central Europe (1956–59); Bomber Command (1953–55); Air Headquarters Malaya (1952–53); No. 1 Group (1949–50); Balkan Air Force (1945); RAF Watton (c.1941–42); No. 115 Squadron (1939–41)
- Conflicts: Second World War
- Awards: Knight Grand Cross of the Order of the Bath; Distinguished Flying Cross; Mentioned in Despatches (2)
- Other work: Black Rod

Air Chief Marshal Sir George Holroyd Mills, GCB, DFC (26 March 1902 – 14 April 1971) was a senior Royal Air Force commander. After his retirement from the RAF, Mills served as Black Rod in the Houses of Parliament until 1970. He was also a trustee of the Imperial War Museum.

== RAF career ==
Mills joined the RAF College at Cranwell as a cadet in 1920 and became one of the earliest graduates of the newly formed College. After graduating he spent a short time at the RAF Depot. Mills was then posted to Mesopotamia flying DH 9As with No. 8 Squadron. He transferred to No. 100 Squadron in 1927 flying Hawker Horsley aircraft. He attended the RAF Staff College in 1935.

He served in the Second World War taking up command of No. 115 Squadron in late 1939 and then joining the Air Staff at Headquarters Bomber Command before becoming Station Commander at RAF Watton. He was appointed Director of Policy (General) at the Air Ministry in September 1943 and Air Officer Commanding Balkan Air Force in February 1945.

After the War he was appointed Director of Plans at the Air Ministry in 1946, Air Officer Commanding No. 1 Group in 1949 and Air Officer Commanding Air Headquarters Malaya in 1952. He went on to be Air Officer Commander-in-Chief Bomber Command in April 1953, Commander Allied Air Forces Central Europe in January 1956 and Chairman of the British Joint Services Mission to Washington, D.C., and UK Representative on the NATO Standing Group in July 1959.

He retired from the Royal Air Force on 18 September 1962.

In retirement he served as Gentleman Usher of the Black Rod in the Houses of Parliament.

His children included Air Marshal Sir Nigel Mills.

== Honours and awards ==
- Distinguished Flying Cross (DFC) – 31 May 1940
- Companion of the Order of the Bath (CB) – 14 June 1945
- Knight Commander of the Order of the Bath (KCB) – 1 January 1954
- Knight Grand Cross of the Order of the Bath (GCB) – 1 January 1959

Military offices
Preceded by William Elliot	Air Officer Commanding the Balkan Air Force; 1945	Air force disestablished
Preceded by Sir Hugh Lloyd	Commander-in-Chief Bomber Command; 1953–1955	Succeeded by Sir Harry Broadhurst
Preceded by Sir Basil Embry	Commander Allied Air Forces Central Europe; 1956–1959	Succeeded by Sir Harry Broadhurst
Preceded by Sir Michael Denny	Chief of the British Joint Staff Mission to Washington and UK Military Representative to NATO; 1959–1962	Succeeded by Sir Michael West
Government offices
Preceded by Sir Brian Horrocks	Black Rod; 1963–1970	Succeeded by Sir Frank Twiss
