= Leslie Grainge =

England international rugby league footballer

Les Grainge
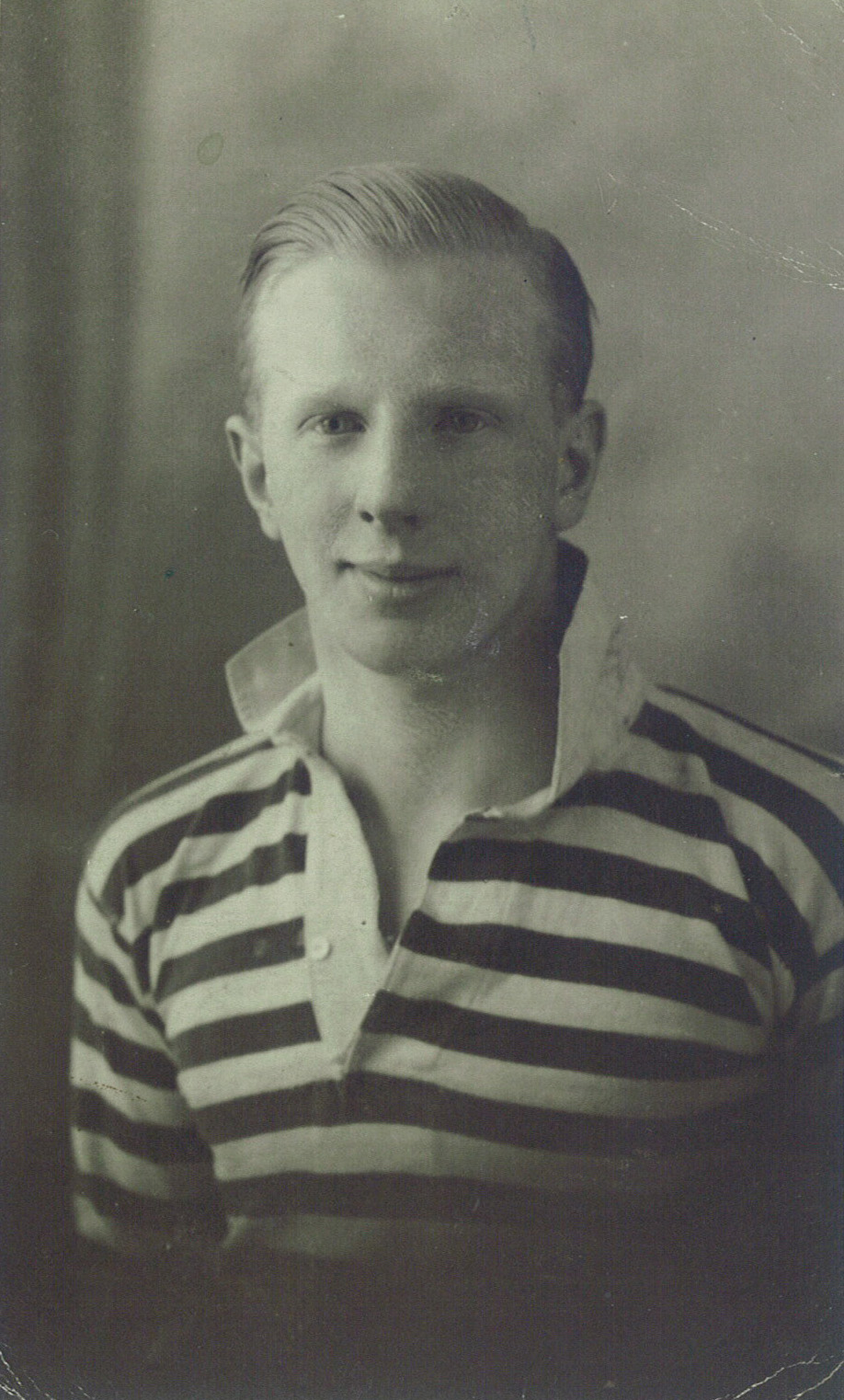

Personal information
- Full name: George Leslie Grainge
- Born: 29 November 1910 Keighley, West Riding of Yorkshire, England
- Died: 29 August 1983 (aged 72) Keswick, Cumbria, England

Playing information
- Height: 6 ft 0 in (1.83 m)
- Weight: 13 st 0 lb (83 kg)
- Position: Wing
Club
Years	Team	Pld	T	G	FG	P
1931–34	Leeds	72	37	2		115
1934–35	Hunslet	21	6			18
1935–39	Bradford Northern	144	54			162
	Total	237	97	2	0	295
Representative
Years	Team	Pld	T	G	FG	P
1937–38	England	1	0	0	0	0

George Leslie Grainge (29 November 1910 – 29 August 1983) was an English professional rugby league footballer who played in the 1930s. He played at representative level for England, and at club level for Leeds, Hunslet and Bradford Northern, as a wing.

== Background ==
Grainge was born in Keighley, West Riding of Yorkshire, England, he attended Woodhouse Grove School, in Apperley Bridge, where he was Head Prefect and Victor Ludorum twice, and captain of the cricket, rugby union and lacrosse teams, he died aged 72 in Keswick, Cumbria, England.

== International honours ==
Grainge won a cap for England while at Bradford Northern in the 17-15 victory over France at Stade Buffalo, Paris on Sunday 20 March 1938.
