= John Baird (RAF officer) =

British physician and RAF officer (1937–2020)

- Born: 25 July 1937
- Died: 12 November 2020 (aged 83)
- Military career
- Allegiance: United Kingdom
- Branch: Royal Air Force
- Rank: Air Marshal
- Commands: Surgeon General of the British Armed Forces (1997–00)
- Awards: Knight Commander of the Order of the British Empire. Commander of the Order of St John.

Air Marshal Sir John Alexander Baird, KBE, CStJ, DL, FRAeS, FRCPE (25 July 1937 – 12 November 2020) was a British physician and a retired Royal Air Force medical officer who served as Surgeon-General of the British Armed Forces from 1997 to 2000.

Baird was appointed a Knight Commander of the Order of the British Empire (KBE) in the 1999 Birthday Honours. He was appointed Commander of the Order of St John (CStJ) in 1997

Honour Ribbons:

- : Order of the British Empire (KBE)
- : Venerable Order of St John. (CStJ)

Military offices
Preceded by Anthony Revell	Surgeon General of the British Armed Forces; 1997–2000	Succeeded by Robert Menzies
