= Uzair Mahomed =

South African-born English cricketer

Personal information
- Full name: Uzair Mahomed
- Born: 20 March 1987 (age 39); Johannesburg, Transvaal Province, South Africa
- Nickname: Uzi
- Height: 5 ft 9 in (1.75 m)
- Batting: Right-handed
- Bowling: Right-arm off break

Domestic team information
- Years: Team
- 2005: Northumberland
- 2008: Durham

Career statistics
Competition	List A
Matches	1
Runs scored	3
Batting average	3.00
100s/50s	–/–
Top score	3
Catches/stumpings	–/–
- Source: Cricinfo, 8 August 2011

Uzair Mahomed (born 20 August 1987) is a South African born English former cricketer. Mahomed is a right-handed batsman who bowls right-arm off break. He was born in Johannesburg, Transvaal Province and educated in England at Bradford Grammar School and Woodhouse Grove School.

Mahomed played a single Minor Counties Championship match for Northumberland against Staffordshire in 2005, the same season in which he joined Durham. He played mostly for the Durham Second XI, before making a single List A appearance for Durham against Bangladesh A. He scored 3 runs in this match, before being dismissed by Sajidul Islam. Released by Durham at the end of the 2008 season, he played for the Northamptonshire Second XI in 2009, but he failed to gain a contract with the county.
