= Commission for Health Improvement =

UK non-departmental public body

The Commission for Health Improvement (CHI) was a non-departmental public body sponsored by the Department of Health of the United Kingdom from 2001 until 2004, when its functions were subsumed by the Healthcare Commission.

CHI was established by the Health Act 1999. It was the first organisation ever to assess the clinical performance of National Health Service hospitals in England. Its chair was Dame Deirdre Hine, who was a former Chief Medical Officer for Wales; and its chief executive was Dr Peter Homa CBE, who went on to become chief executive of St George's Healthcare NHS Trust in November 2003.

CHI was abolished on 31 March 2004.

== Functions ==
CHI's aim was to improve the quality of patient care:

- assessing every NHS organisation and making its findings public
- investigating when there is serious failure
- checking that the NHS is following national guidelines
- advising the NHS on best practice
- CHI will be independent, rigorous and fair in its work, highlighting best practice in the NHS and encouraging others to adopt it, while not flinching from saying clearly where urgent improvement is required

Its six operating principles were:

- the patients experience is at the heart of CHI's work
- CHI will be independent, rigorous and fair
- CHI's approach is developmental and will support the NHS to continuously improve
- CHI's work will be based on the best available evidence and focus on improvement
- CHI will be open and accessible
- CHI will apply the same standards of continuous improvement to itself that it expects of others

== Background ==
Before CHI was established the Health Advisory Service in England and Wales and the Hospital Advisory Service in Scotland performed a similar role, but only in respect of mental illness, geriatric and mental handicap services.
