= William James Moore =

British Surgeon

Sir William Moore
- Born: William James Moore c. 1828; Halesowen, England
- Died: 18 August 1896; London, England
- Education: Queen's College, Birmingham
- Occupations: Surgeon; Medical Writer
- Spouse: Mary Anne Harriet Moore (before 1896)
- Children: 1

Sir William James Moore KCIE (1828-1896) was a Physician and Surgeon-General in British India. He was also Honorary Physician to Queen Victoria.

== Early life ==
He was the son of Edward Moore DL JP of Halesowen. His grandfather was William Moore Esq. of Woodsetton House, Sedgley. His father was Justice of the Peace for Worcestershire from 1853, Staffordshire from 1862 and Deputy Lieutenant for Worcestershire from 1859. He studied medicine at Queen's College, Birmingham.

== Career ==
He was a resident surgeon at Queen's Hospital, Birmingham for three years until 1852, during which time he was awarded a prize from the British Medical Association for work he did on "the treatment of the contraction of the cicatrices of burns".

He entered the Bombay Medical Service in 1852 and served in the Anglo-Persian War from 1856-7.

In 1873 he was awarded 1000 Rupees by the Government of India for his work on A Manual of Family Medicine and Hygiene for India.

He was appointed Deputy-Surgeon-General in 1877. In 1882 he was Dean of the Faculty of the University of Bombay. He was appointed Surgeon-General in 1885 and retired in 1888.

He was knighted in 1888 and made Honorary Physician to the Queen.

== Personal life ==
He married Mary Anne Harriet and had one son, Colonel Arthur Trevelyan Moore CBE.

He died on September 9, 1896 at his residence, 15 Portland Place in London.

He was presented upon retirement with a life-size portrait that was hung in the Town Hall of Bombay.

== Selected works ==
- A Manual of Family Medicine and Hygiene for India
- The Immediate Treatment of Accidents and Injuries
- A Manual of the Diseases of India
- Health in the Tropics, or, Sanitary Art Applied to Europeans in India
- The Other Side of the Opium Question
- Health Resorts for Tropical Invalids
- Leprosy and Leper Houses
- "On recruiting the Anglo-Indian Army"
