= Balthasar Guersye =

Italian physician

Balthasar Guersye, M.D. (died 7 January 1557), was an Italian physician who rose to high favour at the court of Henry VIII becoming Physician to the King.

His surname was variously transcribed as Guersie, De Gracys, Guarcy, Guarsy, Guercio, Guercy, Guercye, and Gwercye.

He was born in Italy, and became physician and surgeon to Catherine of Aragon and Henry VIII.

On 7 November 1519, 'Thomas Roos of London, surgeon, was bound over in 100l. not to molest Baltazar de Guerciis, or pursue an information late put into the King's Exchequer, till he prove that surgery is an handicraft'. Guersye was naturalised on 16 March 1521–2. About 1530 he took the degree of M.B. at Cambridge University. On 9 November 1532, his services were rewarded by a grant of lands. On 20 August 1534, he obtained licence to depart into Italy with three servants, five horses or geldings, and twenty crowns of the sun, baggage, etc. He was also surgeon to Henry VIII, and in 1543 was engaged in collecting accusations against Archbishop Cranmer.

He was by special grace admitted M.D. at Cambridge in 1546. He was excepted out of the act of general pardon 7 Edward VI, being therein described as "Balthaser Guarsy, surgenn". On 22 December 1556, he was admitted a fellow of the College of Physicians. Guersye, who had long resided in the parish of St. Helen's, Bishopsgate, was buried there on 10 January 1556–7. His will, in which he describes himself as 'being aged and weake of body and diseased,' was dated on 7 January 1556 – 1557, and proved with a codicil at London on the following 18 January. He left two sons, Benedick, admitted B.C.L. on 17 February 1537–8 at Oxford, and Richard, and two daughters, Frances, widow of Thomas Polsted, and Mary Polley. He left a sum of money to be distributed among the poor of Tadmarton, Oxfordshire, and St. Helen's, Bishopsgate. His wife died before him.
