= Clare Walton =

RAF senior officer and doctor

Air Marshal Clare Walton CB CStJ
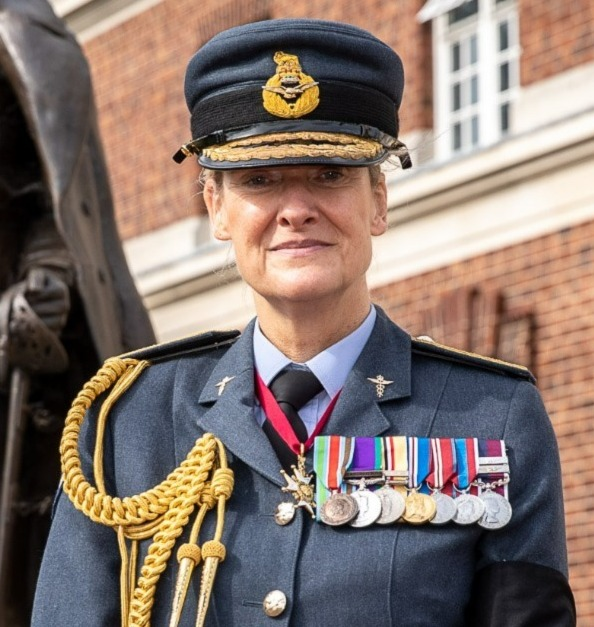
- Air Vice-Marshal Walton in 2022
- Born: 20 November 1964 (age 61)
- Military career
- Allegiance: United Kingdom
- Branch: Royal Air Force
- Service years: 1987–present
- Rank: Air Marshal
- Commands: Defence Medical Group; Defence Medical Rehabilitation Centre Headley Court
- Conflicts: United Nations Protection Force; Iraq War
- Awards: Companion of the Order of the Bath; Venerable Order of St John

Air Marshal Clare Samantha Walton, CB, CStJ (born 20 November 1964) is a British retired senior Royal Air Force officer and physician. From July 2023 to July 2026, she served as Director General Defence Medical Services, later restyled as Chief of Defence Medical.

== Early life ==
Walton was born on 20 November 1964 in Stockport, Cheshire, England. She was educated at Westcliff High School for Girls, a grammar school in Southend-on-Sea, Essex. She studied medicine at St Bartholomew's Hospital Medical School, graduating with a Bachelor of Science (BSc) degree and then Bachelor of Medicine, Bachelor of Surgery (MB BS) degrees in 1989.

== RAF career ==
Walton was commissioned into the Medical Branch of the Royal Air Force (RAF) on 27 March 1987 as a pilot officer: she was being sponsored through her degree by a University Cadetship with the RAF. After training at Royal Air Force College Cranwell, she was promoted to squadron leader on 1 August 1990. She transferred from a short service commission to a permanent commission on 24 April 1992. She has served a number of posting abroad, the first of which was with the United Nations Protection Force in Bosnia-Herzegovina. Having returned, she completed the Diploma in Aviation Medicine (DAvMed) in 1996. She served as a senior medical officer in Kuwait as part of Operation Desert Fox. In 2002, she was posted to Iraq as part of Operation Telic, where she had overall responsibility for organising aeromedical evacuation. From 2006 to 2008, she was senior medical officer at RAF Leeming.

From 2011 to 2014, Walton served as commanding officer of Defence Medical Rehabilitation Centre Headley Court. She was deputy head of the RAF Medical Services from 2014 to 2016, before being appointed Air Officer Medical Operations in No. 38 Group RAF on 13 June 2016. She was then Commander of the Defence Medical Group from 2018 to 2020.

From February 2020, she was Director Defence Medical Personnel & Training, based at Defence Medical Services Whittington. In October 2022 it was announced that Walton would succeed as Director General of the Defence Medical Services from July 2023. She was promoted to Air Marshal and took up the position on 3 July 2023. In May 2026, the appointment was restyled from Director General Defence Medical Services to Chief of Defence Medical. She stepped down in July 2026 upon her retirement and was succeed as Chief of Defence Medical by Phil Carter in an interim capacity.

== Personal life ==
In 2003, Walton married Mark Hopkins. He is a fellow RAF officer, who rose to the rank of air commodore. Through this marriage, she has two step children.

== Honours ==
Walton was appointed Companion of the Order of the Bath (CB) in the 2022 New Year Honours. In 2025, she was appointed Commander to the Venerable Order of St John (CStJ).

In 2024, she was awarded an honorary Doctor of Health Sciences degree by Anglia Ruskin University.

Military offices
Preceded by Peter Homa	Director General of Defence Medical Services; 2023–2026	Succeeded by Phil Carter as interim Chief of Defence Medical
