= John Hillaby =

British travel writer (1917-1996)

- Born: 24 July 1917
- Died: 19 October 1996 (aged 79); York, England
- Occupation: Journalist
- Spouse(s): Eleanor Riley (1940–1966); Thelma Gordon (1966–1972); Kathleen Burton (1981–1996)
- Children: 2 daughters
- Writing career
- Period: 1949–1992
- Genre: Travel writing
- Subjects: Britain, Europe, Africa
- Notable work: Journey to the Jade Sea Journey Through Britain

John Donald Hillaby (24 July 1917 – 19 October 1996) was a British travel writer and explorer.

== Early life and education ==
Hillaby was the eldest of three sons of printer Albert Ewart Hillaby (d. 1967), of Pontefract, West Yorkshire, and Mabel (née Colyer; d. 1977). He was educated at Woodhouse Grove School, Leeds. His younger brother, Joseph Gordon Hillaby (1933-), is a historian and writer, and was chairman of the Council for the Preservation of Rural England and president of the Jewish Historical Society of England from 2006 to 2008. The Hillaby family came from Pontefract, West Yorkshire, where since 1850 they had been prominent manufacturers of liquorice, producing, amongst other things, Pontefract cakes and allsorts; in 1978 Hillaby noted "alas, we've had nothing to do with the profits for over half a century", attributing the business's eventual failure to his grandfather's taste for "slow horses and fast women", acting as "a rather goatish old man about town" who spent much of his time at "the bars on Tanshelf race course".

== Career ==
Hillaby embarked on a career in journalism, interrupted by service in the Second World War. After the war he worked for the Manchester Guardian, the New York Times and the New Scientist.

In 1949, he published his first book, Within the Streams. His real impact on the literary scene came in 1964, when he published Journey to the Jade Sea, an account of his 1,000-mile walk with a camel train through northern Kenya to Lake Turkana. The book set the pattern for his later books, Journey Through Britain (1968), an account of his walk from Land's End to John o' Groats, Journey Through Europe (1972), an account of his walk from Holland to the Italian Alps and back to France, and Journey Through Love (1976).

His earlier journeys were always alone, but after he married Kathleen Burton (also a great walker) in 1981 the two travelled together. She featured in his later books, Journey Home (1983), John Hillaby's Yorkshire (1986), John Hillaby's London (1987) and Journey to the Gods (1991).

== Personal life ==
In 1940, Hillaby married Eleanor Riley. They had two daughters before divorcing in 1966. His second marriage was in 1966, to Thelma Gordon (d. 1972); he married thirdly Kathleen Burton, in 1981.
