= Alasdair Walker =

British medical doctor and Royal Navy officer (1956–2019)

Surgeon Vice-Admiral Alasdair Walker CB OBE QHS FRCS
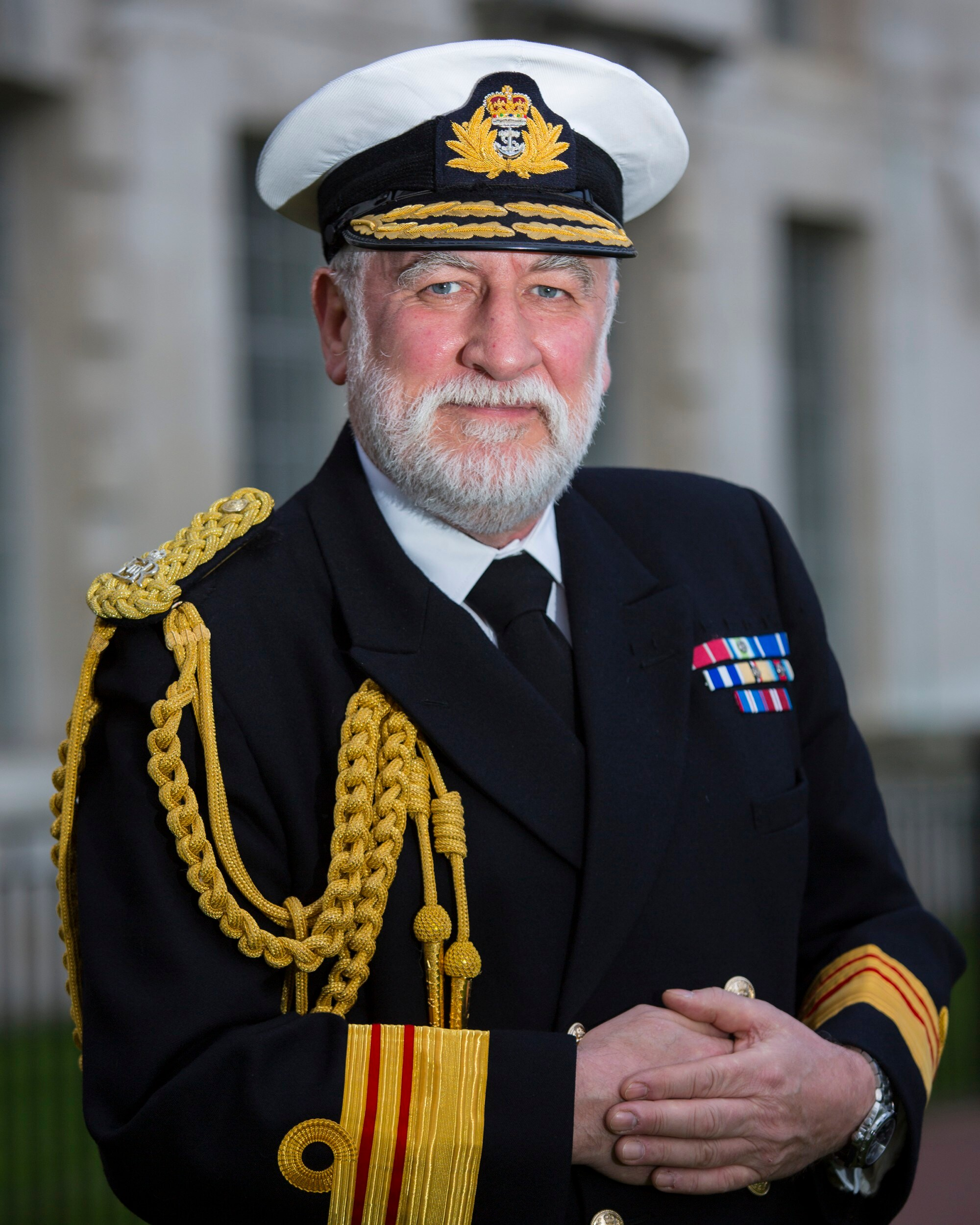
- Surgeon Admiral Walker in 2018 as a Surgeon Vice-Admiral
- Born: Alasdair James Walker; 22 June 1956; Glasgow, Scotland
- Died: 1 June 2019 (aged 62)
- Military career
- Allegiance: United Kingdom
- Branch: Royal Navy
- Service years: 1978–2019
- Rank: Surgeon Vice-Admiral
- Service number: C025111J
- Commands: Commando Forward Surgical Group 2
- Conflicts: Falklands War; Iraq War; War in Afghanistan
- Awards: Companion of the Order of the Bath; Officer of the Order of the British Empire

Surgeon Vice-Admiral Alasdair James Walker, CB, OBE, QHS, FRCS (22 June 1956 – 1 June 2019) was a British medical doctor and senior Royal Navy officer. He served as Surgeon-General of the British Armed Forces.

== Early life and education ==
From 1965 to 1974, Walker was educated at the High School of Glasgow, then a grammar school in Glasgow, Scotland. From 1974 to 1979, he studied medicine at the University of Glasgow, and graduated with Bachelor of Medicine, Bachelor of Surgery degrees.

== Military career ==
Walker deployed to the South Atlantic during the Falklands War in 1982 and led Commando Forward Surgical Group 2 during the Iraq War in 2003.

Walker became Assistant Medical Director at the Plymouth Hospitals NHS Trust in 2005, and after being deployed to Afghanistan, he was promoted to commodore and became Medical Director at Joint Medical Command in 2009.

Walker went on to be Director of Medical Policy and Operational Capability for the Surgeon General in 2011 and, promoted to rear admiral, he became Director Medical Policy and Operational Capability at the Ministry of Defence as well as Assistant Chief of the Defence Staff for Health in July 2014. He became Chief Medical Officer & Medical Director General (Navy) in December 2014. In December 2015, he was promoted to vice admiral and appointed Surgeon-General of the British Armed Forces. He was appointed Companion of the Order of the Bath (CB) in the 2017 Birthday Honours.

Walker retired from the Royal Navy as a surgeon vice-admiral on 1 May 2019. He died on 1 June 2019, aged 62, having had brain cancer.

Military offices
| Preceded by Paul Evans | Surgeon General of the British Armed Forces; 2015–2018 | Succeeded by Martin Bricknell |
