= Martin Bricknell =

British military physician

Lieutenant General Martin Bricknell CB QHP
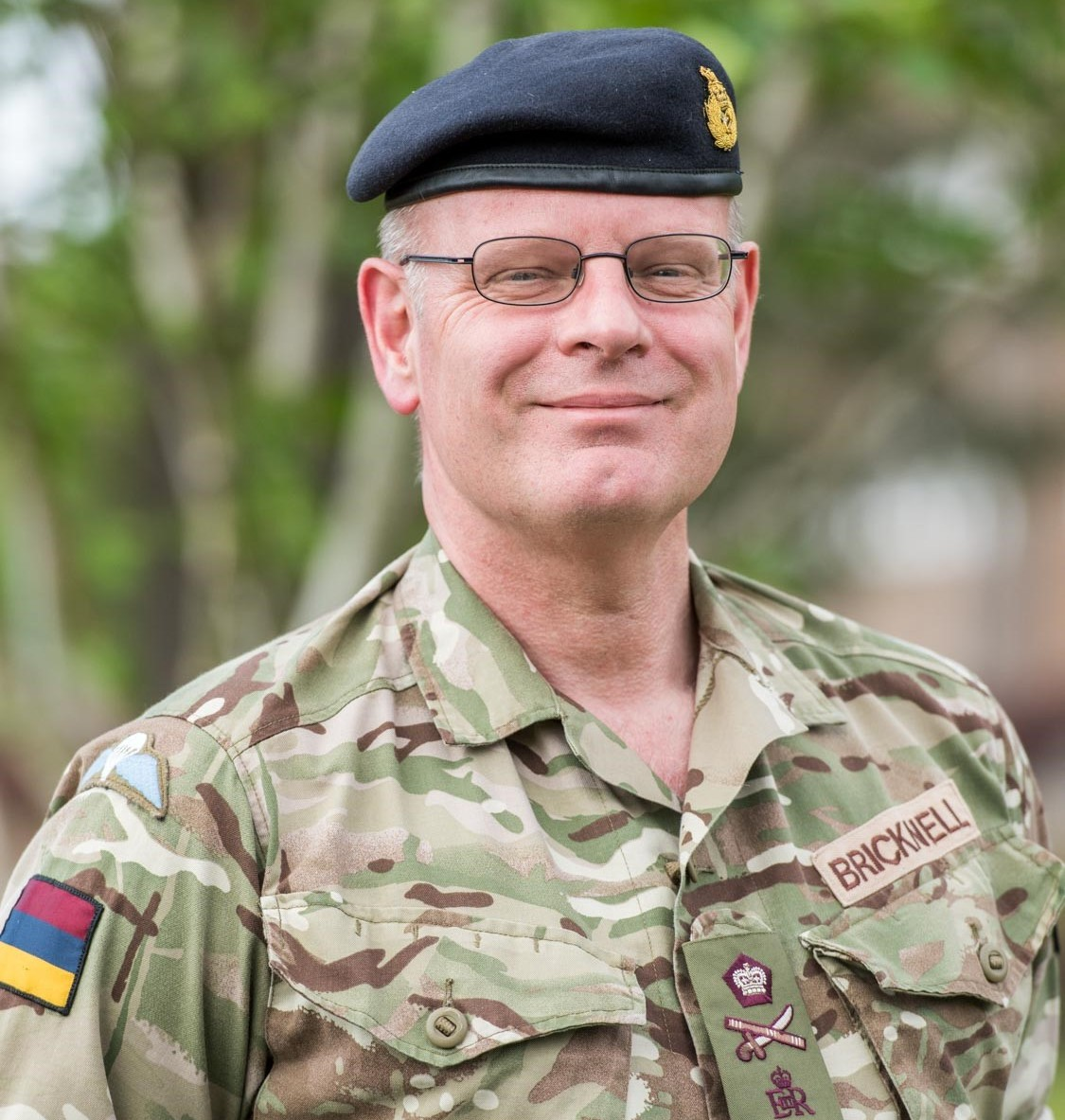
- Lieutenant General Bricknell, 2018
- Military career
- Allegiance: United Kingdom
- Branch: British Army
- Service years: 1987–2019
- Rank: Lieutenant General
- Unit: Royal Army Medical Corps
- Commands: 22 Field Hospital
- Conflicts: Bosnian War; Iraq War; War in Afghanistan
- Awards: Companion of the Order of the Bath; Bronze Star Medal (United States)

Lieutenant General Martin Charles Marshall Bricknell, CB, QHP is a British physician and former British Army officer. He served as Surgeon General of the British Armed Forces from 2018 to 2019.

== Early life and education ==
Martin Bricknell studied medicine at Southampton Medical School, University of Southampton. He subsequently trained as a general practitioner, in occupational medicine, and public health. In addition to his medical degree, he holds Master of Arts (MA), Master of Medical Science (MMedSci) and Master of Business Administration (MBA) degrees. He holds two doctorates: a Doctor of Medicine (MD) degree from the University of Southampton, and a Doctor of Philosophy (PhD) degree from the University of Glamorgan. His MD thesis, which was completed in 1999, is titled "The prevention of heart illness in the British Army". His PhD thesis, which was completed in 2011 and supervised by Professor Peter McCarthy, is titled "Managing health services support to military operations".

== Military career ==
Bricknell commanded 22 Field Hospital in the Balkans. He went on to become Chief Medical Adviser at Headquarters Allied Rapid Reaction Corps, in which capacity he was deployed as Medical Adviser at Headquarters International Security Assistance Force in 2006 and then as Medical Adviser at Headquarters Regional Command (South) in 2010. He became Head of Medical Operations and Capability in Headquarters Surgeon General in 2015 and Director of Medical Policy, Operations and Capability at the Ministry of Defence as well as Assistant Chief of the Defence Staff (Health) in December 2015. Bricknell received a US Bronze Star Medal for distinguished services in Afghanistan on 26 February 2015.

In May 2018, Bricknell became Surgeon-General of the British Armed Forces with the acting rank of lieutenant general. He was appointed a Companion of the Order of the Bath in the 2019 New Year Honours. Bricknell retired from the British Army on 3 April 2019 with the honorary rank of lieutenant general.

== Post-military career ==
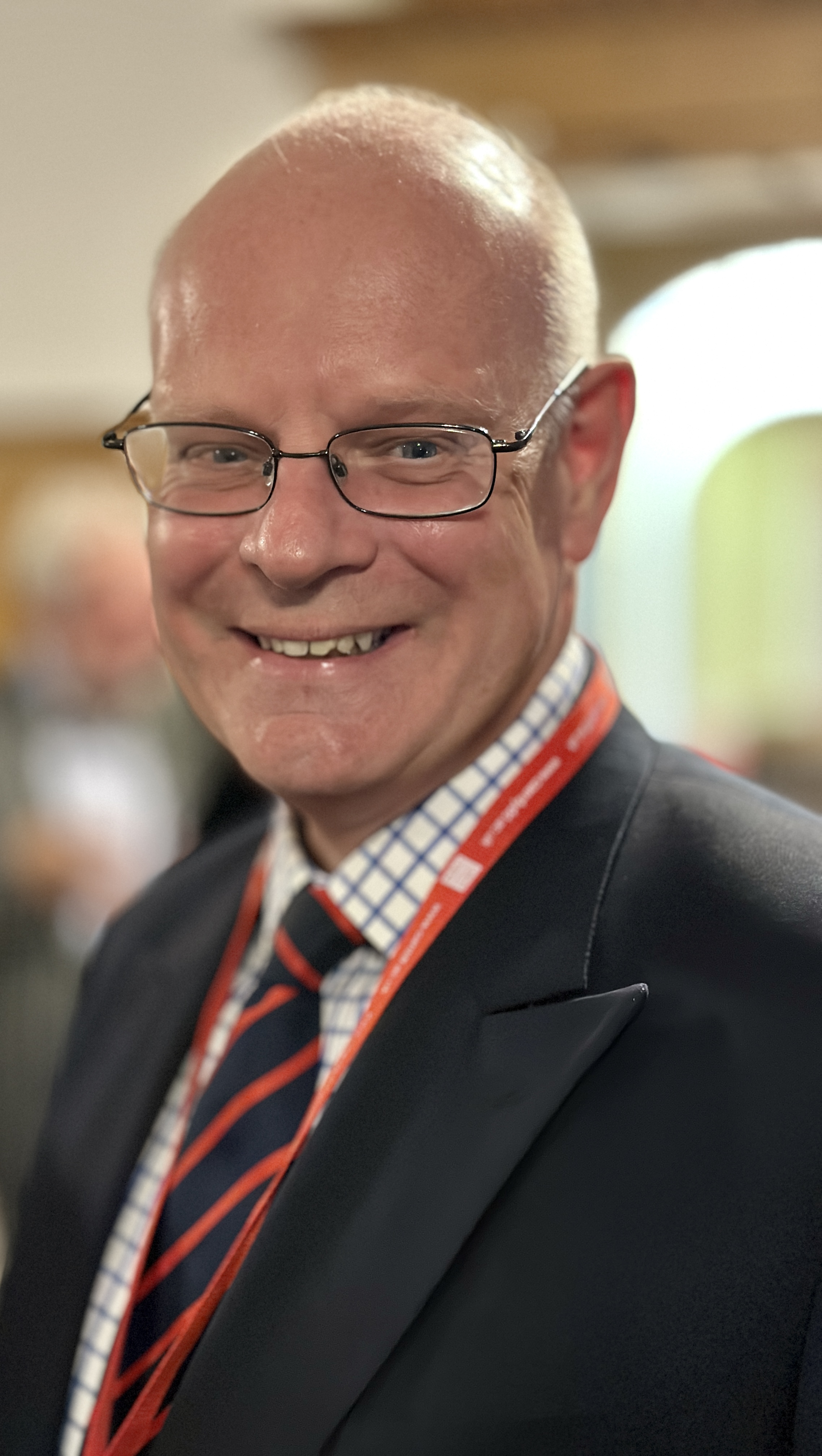
Martin Bricknell (2023)

Bricknell joined King's College London as Professor of Conflict, Health and Military Medicine in April 2019 and is an advisor to their Centre for Military Ethics.

== Bibliography ==
- Bricknell, Martin and Sullivan, Richard (2025). Handbook of Global Health, Security, and War. Wiley. ISBN 978-1-394-32609-9

Military offices
| Preceded by Alasdair Walker | Surgeon General of the British Armed Forces; 2018–2019 | Succeeded by Alastair Reid |
