= Hundred Guineas Club =

19th century London molly house

General information
- Location: Portland Place, London, United Kingdom

Hundred Guineas Club in Portland Place, London was a high-class 19th century molly house, so called because of its expensive membership fee. At the club, members and their guests customarily assumed feminine names, and some of them cross-dressed. A typical evening involved dancing, conversations and refreshments, until at 2 am the lights were turned off and the guests were free to approach any of the sex workers—the so-called "Mary-Anns". According to his biographer Michael Harrison, Prince Albert Victor frequented the club under the name Victoria. The club, referred to as "Mr. Inslip's Club", appears in the scandalous 1881 non-fiction novel The Sins of the Cities of the Plain.

== See also ==
- John Saul
- Boulton and Park
- Cleveland Street scandal
- Timeline of LGBTQ history in the British Isles
