= Peter Homa =

British health service manager

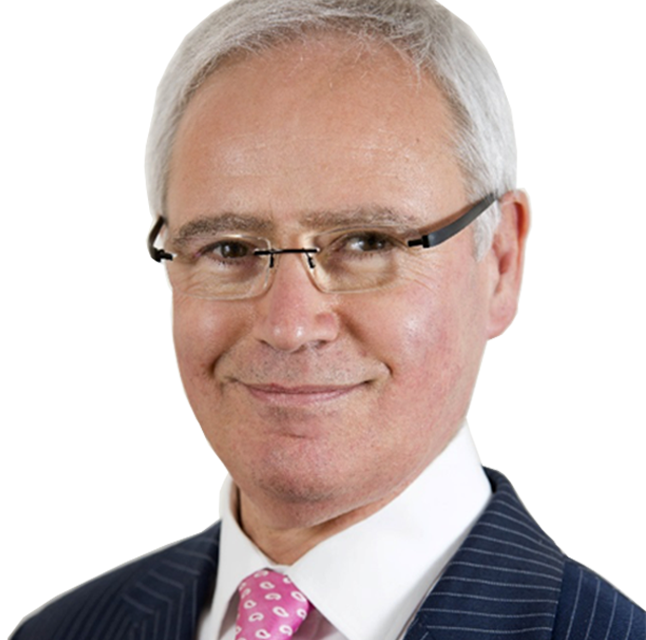
Peter Homa

Peter Michael Homa CBE is a British health service manager.

He started work in the National Health Service in 1979 as a hospital porter after which he commenced the NHS National Management Training Scheme in London in 1981 and was chief executive at Leicester Royal Infirmary in 1989, when it was one of two national pilot hospitals to achieve significant improvement in both the quality and efficiency of patient care.

He was appointed a CBE in the Queen's Birthday Honours in 2000 for contributions to the health service.

He was the Chief Executive of the Commission for Health Improvement and was appointed as the first Chief Executive of the new Healthcare Commission which replaced it but resigned from the post at the request of the organisation's chairman Sir Ian Kennedy in April 2003. He went on to become chief executive of St George's Healthcare NHS Trust in November 2003.

He was an assessor in the Mid-Staffordshire NHS Foundation Trust Public Inquiry.

He was Chief Executive of Nottingham University Hospitals NHS Trust from 2006 to 2017.

Homa served as the first civilian Director General, Defence Medical Services from 2019 to 2023.

Military offices
| Preceded by Martin Bricknell | Director General of Defence Medical Services; 2019–2023 | Succeeded by Clare Walton |
