= Tony Revell =

British Royal Navy medical officer

Surgeon Vice-Admiral Anthony Leslie Revell CB CStJ QHS FRCA FRSM (26 April 1935 – 30 December 2018) was a British Royal Navy medical officer and Surgeon General of the British Armed Forces from 1994 to 1997.

Military offices
Preceded by Peter Beale	Surgeon General of the British Armed Forces; 1994–1997	Succeeded by John Baird
