= Timothy Hodgetts =

Senior British army officer and doctor

Major General Timothy Hodgetts CB CBE KHS DL
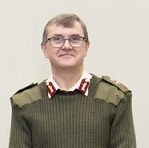
- Military career
- Allegiance: United Kingdom
- Branch: British Army
- Service years: 1983–2024
- Rank: Major General
- Unit: Army Medical Services
- Commands: Surgeon General of the United Kingdom Armed Forces
- Conflicts: The Troubles; Kosovo War; Iraq War; War in Afghanistan
- Awards: Companion of the Order of the Bath; Commander of the Order of the British Empire

Major General Timothy John Hodgetts, CB, CBE, KHS, DL is a senior British Army officer and medical doctor. He served as head of the Army Medical Services (2018–2021) and then as Surgeon General of the United Kingdom Armed Forces (2021–2024).

== Military career ==
Educated at the Westminster Hospital Medical School, Hodgetts was commissioned into the Royal Army Medical Corps in 1983. His early career was spent as a general physician. In 1991, he was serving a tour of duty in Northern Ireland when the IRA bombed the military hospital that he was working at; he served as medical commander for the incident and used his experience to later create the Major Incident Medical Management and Support (MIMMS) program for responding to multiple casualty incidents. He was posted to Kosovo in 1999 as an emergency medicine specialist in a field hospital and also working with the local civilian hospital in Pristina to bring up their emergency department to British best practice standard.

Hodgetts undertook four tours of Iraq and three tours of Afghanistan. This included serving as the medical director at the multinational hospital in Afghanistan in 2009. He was appointed Commander of the Order of the British Empire (CBE) in the 2009 New Year Honours, He became medical director for NATO's Allied Rapid Reaction Corps in 2011, serving until 2013.

Hodgetts was appointed medical director for the Defence Medical Services in 2014, and then head of the Army Medical Services in 2018. He was appointed Surgeon General of the United Kingdom Armed Forces in May 2021. In December 2021, he additionally became chairman of NATO's Committee of the Chiefs of Military Medical Services (COMEDS). He was appointed to the honorary post of Master General Army Medical Services on 1 January 2022. In the 2023 Birthday Honours, he was appointed Companion of the Order of the Bath (CB). In May 2024, he was succeeded as surgeon general by Philip McNee.

On the creation of the Royal Army Medical Service in late 2024, Hodgetts was appointed the first Master General Medical of the service.

He is a Deputy Lieutenant of the West Midlands.

Military offices
Preceded by Alastair Reid	Surgeon General of the British Armed Forces; 2021–2024	Succeeded by Philip McNee
