= Robert Menzies (British Army officer) =

British Army general

Lieutenant-General Robert Clark Menzies CB OBE FRCPath FFPH FRCPE (born 1944) is a retired British Army medical officer and Surgeon General of the British Armed Forces between 2000 and 2002.

Military offices
Preceded by John Baird	Surgeon General of the British Armed Forces; 2000–2002	Succeeded by Ian Jenkins
