= Frederick Charles Hurrell =

British aviation medic

- Air Vice Marshal Frederick Charles Hurrell
- Born: 24 April 1928; Lady Ozanne Maternity Hospital, Guernsey
- Died: 3 October 2008 (aged 80); Farnham, Surrey
- Military career
- Allegiance: United Kingdom
- Branch: Royal Air Force
- Service years: 1953–1988
- Rank: Air Vice Marshal
- Commands: RAF Medical Services (1986–88); RAF Princess Alexandra Hospital (1980–82)
- Awards: Companion of the Order of the Bath; Officer of the Order of the British Empire; Commander of the Order of St John of Jerusalem

Air Vice Marshal Frederick "Freddie" Charles Hurrell, CB, OBE, CStJ, QHP, MRCS, FRAeS (24 April 1928 – 3 October 2008) was a senior medical officer in the Royal Air Force who spent his 35-year military career in aviation medicine and served as Director-General of the RAF Medical Services from 1986 to 1988.

== Early years ==
Hurrell was born in the Lady Ozanne Maternity Hospital in Guernsey in 1928, the son of Alexander John Hurrell (1884–1933), a British Army officer, and a Spanish mother, Maria Del Carmen Bierma Cordero (1887–1968). His father died in 1933 and from the age of eight Hurrell was educated at the Royal Masonic School for Boys in Bushey in Hertfordshire where he enjoyed various sports and played rugby for England Schoolboys against Scotland and Wales Schoolboys.

== Medical training ==
He began his medical training at St Mary's Hospital Medical School in Paddington in October 1946, one of only six teenage schoolboys – the others on the course being more than 50 recently demobilised ex-servicemen. He qualified as a doctor in 1952 and worked at Paddington Green Children's Hospital in both medical and surgical house positions, intending to become a paediatrician. On being called up to do National Service in 1953 he joined the Royal Air Force on a four-year short service commission, but went on to serve for 35 years until retiring in 1988.

== Military career ==
From 1953 to 1965 Hurrell served as medical officer on RAF flying stations in England, Australia and Singapore; during this period he was promoted to squadron leader (1960), wing commander (1965) and learned to fly. While working in a bomber base he flew as a member of the crew to gain experience of the stresses of flying. He completed the Diploma of Aviation Medicine in 1972, and as a wing commander he served as a medical adviser to the Inspector of Air Transport. He co-ordinated the RAF's worldwide aero-medical evacuation service which every year transported more than 3,000 patients from all three services as well as their dependants.

In 1974 Hurrell became the deputy director of Aviation Medicine, was promoted to group captain in 1975, and from 1978 to 1980 he was Staff Officer Aerospace Medicine in Washington on the British Defence Staff. From 1980 to 1982 he was Officer Commanding RAF Princess Alexandra Hospital at RAF Wroughton. This included the time of the Falklands War, when the hospital was the primary destination for casualties from that conflict. In 1981 he was promoted to air commodore, and on promotion to air vice marshal in 1984 he was appointed Principal Medical Officer at RAF Strike Command, where he had responsibility for the medical services provided to 51 Royal Air Force stations across the world. In 1984 he was also appointed an Honorary Physician (QHP) to Queen Elizabeth II.

In 1986 Hurrell became the Director-General of the RAF Medical Services, becoming responsible to the Air Force Board for all aspects of medical, dental and nursing care for the RAF and entitled dependants in Royal Air Force stations in the UK and across the world.

After retiring from the Royal Air Force in 1988 after 35 years of service Hurrell became the Director of Appeals for the RAF Benevolent Fund, serving in that capacity for seven years. From 1997 he was a vice-president of the Royal International Air Tattoo, the largest air show in Europe and held each year at Fairford in Gloucestershire.

Hurrell died of primary brain cancer at his home in Farnham in Surrey in October 2008 aged 80 and was cremated at Aldershot Crematorium.

== Honours and awards ==
In 1970 he received the Chadwick Gold Medal, awarded every five years and only once every 15 years to an RAF officer. He was appointed an Officer of the Order of the British Empire in 1968, and a Companion of the Order of the Bath (CB) in the 1986 Birthday Honours. In 1986 he was appointed a Commander of the Order of St John of Jerusalem and elected a Fellow of the Faculty of Occupational Medicine (FFOM) and a Fellow of the Royal Aeronautical Society (FRAeS) in 1987.
