= Phil Carter (British Army officer) =

British Army general

Major General Phil Carter OStJ KHP
- Education: University of Dundee
- Military career
- Allegiance: United Kingdom
- Branch: British Army
- Service years: 1992–present
- Rank: Major General
- Unit: Royal Army Medical Service

Major General Philip Andrew Carter is a senior British Army officer, currently serving as Surgeon General of the United Kingdom Armed Forces.

== Early life and education ==
Carter was educated at Woodhouse Grove School, an independent school in Apperley Bridge, West Yorkshire. He then studied medicine at the University of Dundee.

== Military career ==
Carter was commissioned into the Royal Army Medical Corps on 1 August 1992.

He became Commanding Officer of the Royal Centre for Defence Medicine Clinical Unit in 2008, and then served as commanding officer of 5 Armoured Medical Regiment, before becoming Commander Medical of 1st (United Kingdom) Division. He served as Commander Defence Primary Healthcare, before being appointed Head of Army Health in 2024 and Surgeon-General in August 2025.

In July 2026, he was appointed as interim Chief of Defence Medical whilst retaining the role of Surgeon General.

Military offices
Preceded by Philip McNee	Surgeon General of the British Armed Forces; 2025–present	Incumbent
