= Defence Medical Services =

- Defence Medical Services logo
- Active: 1 April 1996 – present
- Country: United Kingdom
- Branch: Royal Navy; British Army; Royal Air Force
- Type: Joint organisation
- Role: Military medicine
- Part of: Cyber & Specialist Operations Command
- Headquarters: DMS Whittington
- Website: Official website

Commanders
- Current commander: Air Marshal Clare Walton CB KHP

The Defence Medical Services (DMS) is an umbrella term within the Ministry of Defence in the United Kingdom. It describes the Royal Navy Medical Service, Royal Army Medical Service, RAF Medical Service and Defence Medical Command in the Cyber and Specialist Operations Command.

== Defence Medical Command ==
The Defence Medical Command was formed in 2026 and is led by the Chief of Defence Medical. The Chief of Defence Medical is the defence authority for end to end Defence healthcare and medical operational capability.

The Defence Medical Command has four two-star directors:

- Surgeon General
- Director of Strategy and Transformation
- Director of Medical Personnel and Training
  - The Medical Personnel and Training Directorate includes the Defence Medical Academy, which delivers medical education and training, and the Joint Hospital Group, which force generates hospital specialists for operational duty.
- Director Defence Healthcare
  - Defence Healthcare provides and commissions non-operational healthcare to members of the British Armed Forces. As part of the Directorate, Defence Primary Healthcare provides General Practice, Dental, Mental Health, Physiotherapy and Occupational Health Care for British Armed Forces personnel in the UK and in non-operational overseas locations.

== Role ==
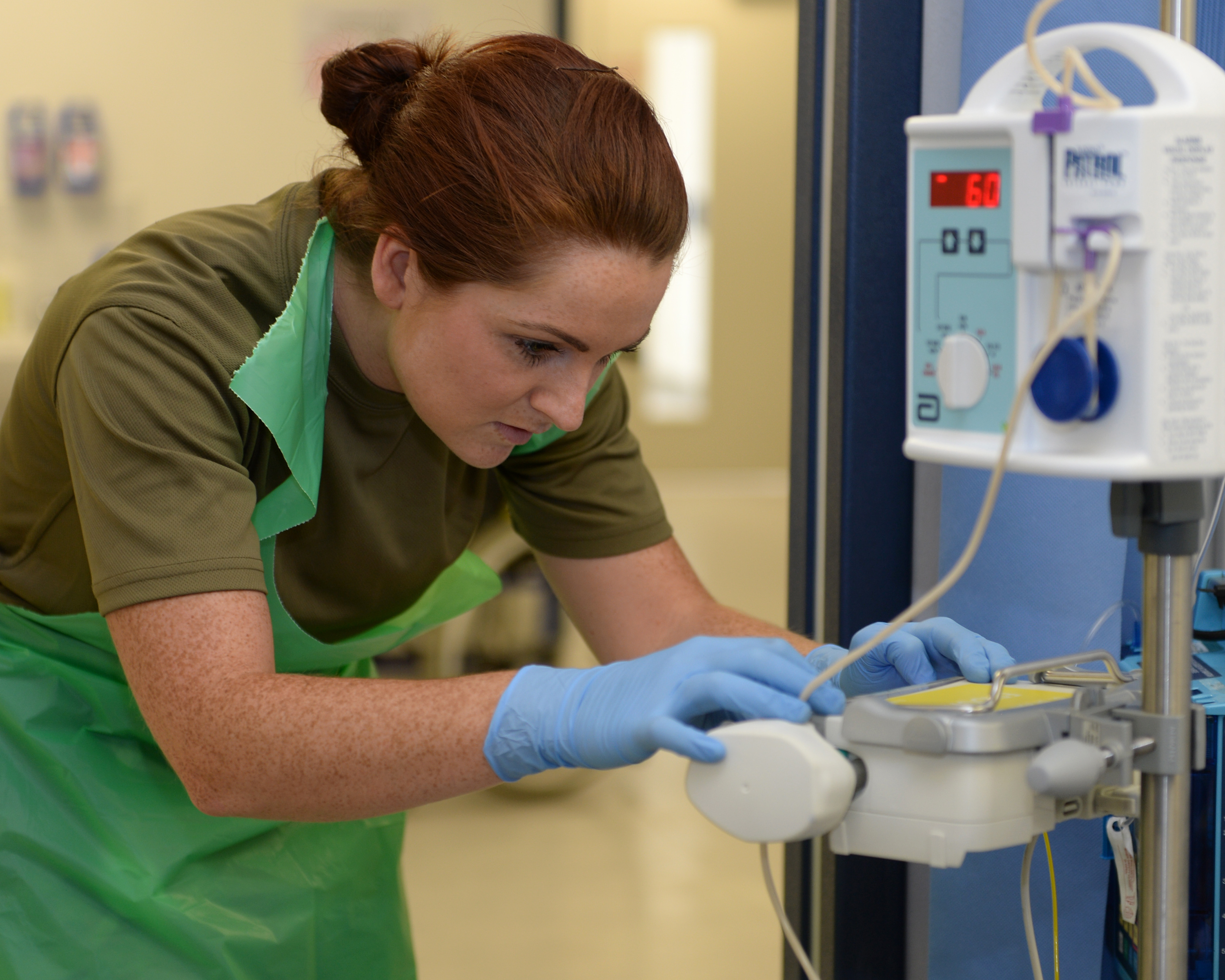
A nurse with 33 Field Hospital, Army Medical Services at Camp Bastion Hospital, Afghanistan during 2013

The Defence Medical Services consists of 7,000 general practitioners, dentists, consultants, nurses, surgeons, allied health professionals and medics (combat medical technicians), both uniformed and civilian personnel, to provide healthcare for the United Kingdom's Armed Forces. It consists of DPHC, the JHGs, and the Defence Medical Academy. Primary Healthcare is provided by Defence Primary Healthcare. Hospital care is primarily provided by the National Health Service. There are, however, embedded military clinicians in Joint Hospital Group units. The main centre for Role 4 hospital care is the Royal Centre for Defence Medicine at the Queen Elizabeth Hospital Birmingham. There are smaller units at:

- Frimley Park Hospital, Frimley, Surrey
- Queen Alexandra Hospital, Portsmouth
- Derriford Hospital, Plymouth
- Queen Elizabeth Hospital Birmingham
- James Cook University Hospital, Middlesbrough
- John Radcliffe Hospital, Oxfordshire
- Queen Victoria Hospital, East Grinstead

Specialist military medical education and training is provided by the Defence Medical Academy in Lichfield.

Defence Medical Command (DMedC) is located at Whittington outside Lichfield.

Deployed operational medical care is provided by the Royal Naval Medical Service, Royal Army Medical Service and Royal Air Force Medical Services.

== History ==
Defence healthcare was reorganised in 1996 to form the modern Defence Medical Services and integrate medical provision across the army, navy and air force.

There have been medical personnel supporting the Armed Forces since the creation of the Armed Forces: ships of the Royal Navy have carried surgeons for centuries; regiments of the British Army have employed surgeons to look after the health of soldiers and to take care of the wounded since their creation.

Units in the British Army are supported by General Practitioners employed as Regimental Medical Officers and a team of Nurses and Combat Medical Technicians. Specialist Medical Regiments provide dental, physiotherapy and mental health support. Royal Air Force Stations have been supported Station Medical Officers and their primary care teams.

The majority of Army Medical Service personnel operate exclusively within the Army, as do all RN Medics when at sea.

From March 2020, the DMS began supporting the UK's COVID-19 relief efforts following the COVID-19 pandemic in the United Kingdom. As part of Operation Rescript, the DMS collectively contributed over half of its 6,500 personnel to support NHS hospitals and Trusts – the largest contribution to the operation from any other part of the MOD. The Royal Centre for Defence Medicine assisted with the construction of NHS Nightingale Hospital Birmingham, a temporary critical care hospital, in April 2020.

== List of Directors General/Chiefs of Defence Medical since 2019 ==
Rank	Name	Post-nominals	Years in office
	Peter Homa	CBE	2019–2023
Air Marshal	Clare Walton	CB, KHP	2023–2026
Major General	Phil Carter		2026–present (interim)
Professor	Jason Leitch		2026 (announced)
