= Physician to the King =

Position of being a physician and/or surgeon to the Sovereign of the United Kingdom

Physician to the King (or Queen, as appropriate) is a title (as postnominals, KHP, QHP) held by physicians of the Medical Household of the Sovereign of the United Kingdom. Part of the Royal Household, the Medical Household includes physicians, who treat general conditions, and extra physicians, specialists who are brought in as required.

In 1973, the position of Head of the Medical Household was created. The occupant of that position is also a Physician to the King.

== Postholders ==
=== Royal households before 1901 ===
- Balthasar Guersye (died 1557), Physician to Henry VIII and Catherine of Aragon
- Matthias de Lobel (1538–1616), Physician to James I
- Martin Schöner (died 1611), Physician to Anne of Denmark.
- Martin Lluelyn (1616–1682), Physician Extraordinary to Charles II 1660.
- Sir Richard Croft (1762–1818), Physician to George III, George IV and Princess Charlotte Augusta.
- Sir Andrew Halliday (1782–1839), Physician to William IV and to Queen Victoria
- Dr Cornwallis Hewett (1787–1841), Physician Extraordinary to William IV
- Sir James Paget, 1st Baronet (1814–1899), Surgeon Extraordinary to Queen Victoria (1858)
- Dr John Forrest (1804–1865), Honorary Physician to Queen Victoria (1859)
- Sir William Moore (1828-1896), Honorary Physician to Queen Victoria
- Sir William Broadbent, 1st Baronet (1835–1907) Physician Extraordinary to Queen Victoria (1896–1901)
- Sir Henry Thompson, 1st Baronet (1820–1904), Physician to Queen Victoria
- Sir Thomas Grainger Stewart (1837–1900), Physician-in-Ordinary to the Queen in Scotland from 1882
- George Steward Beatson 1814–1874), Honorary Physician to the Queen
- Sir Alexander Nisbet (1796–1874), Honorary Physician to the Queen
- John Davidson (died 1881), appointed Honorary Physician to the Queen in 1874
- William James Moore (1828–1896), Honorary Physician to the Queen

=== Royal Household of King Edward VII ===
Physician-in-Ordinary to His Majesty

- Sir William Broadbent, 1st Baronet 29 March 1901 – 1907
- Sir James Reid, 1st Baronet 29 March 1901 – 6 May 1910
- Sir Francis Laking, 2nd Baronet 29 March 1901 – 6 May 1910

Physicians Extraordinary to His Majesty

- Sir Joseph Fayrer, 1st Baronet 29 March 1901–?
- Sir Richard Powell, 1st Baronet 29 March 1901–?
- Sir Edward Henry Sieveking 29 March 1901 – 1904
- Sir Felix Semon 29 March 1901–?
- John Lowe 29 March 1901 – 1904

Honorary Physicians-in-Ordinary to His Majesty in Scotland

- Sir William Tennant Gairdner 29 March 1901–?
- George William Balfour 29 March 1901 – 1903

Honorary Physicians-in-Ordinary to His Majesty in Ireland

- Sir John Thomas Banks 29 March 1901–?
- William Moore 29 March 1901–?

=== Royal Households 1910–1973 ===
- Bertrand Edward Dawson, 1st Viscount Dawson of Penn (1864–1945), Physician to George V, Edward VIII and George VI.
- Sir Thomas Peel Dunhill (1876–1957), Extra Physician to King George V, Edward VIII, George VI and Elizabeth II.
- Thomas Horder, 1st Baron Horder (1871–1955), Extra Physician to Edward VII, George V, Edward VIII, George VI and Elizabeth II.
- Sir John Weir (1879–1971), Physician to George V, Edward VIII, George VI and Elizabeth II.
- Sir Arnold Stott (1885–1958), Extra Physician to George VI and Elizabeth II.
- Sir Edward Mellanby (1884–1955), Honorary Physician to George VI
- Andrew Best Semple (1963–1965), Honorary Physician to Elizabeth II
- Air Marshal Sir Sidney Richard Carlyle Nelson (1961–1967), Honorary Physician to Queen Elizabeth II.
- Air Vice-Marshal Frederick Charles Hurrell Honorary Physician to Elizabeth II.
- Professor Kenneth Gordon Lowe Queen's Physician in Scotland.

=== Royal Household post-1973 ===
- see Heads of the Medical Household.

== See also ==
- Physician to the President
