= Royal Navy Medical Service =

Medical Service for the Royal Navy

- Active: 1832 – present (Current Structure Adopted in 1917)
- Country: United Kingdom
- Branch: Royal Navy
- Role: Medicine
- Website: Royal Navy Medical Service

Commanders
- Medical Director General (Naval): Commodore Alison Hofman
- Commodore-in-Chief: Queen Camilla

Insignia
- White Ensign (1801–present)

- Naval jack

- Red Cross emblem

The Royal Navy Medical Service (RNMS), also termed the Royal Naval Medical Service is the branch of the Royal Navy responsible for providing 'comprehensive healthcare to ships, submarines and Royal Marine personnel at sea and on land'. It includes within its remit of responsibility Queen Alexandra's Royal Naval Nursing Service.

The Head of the Royal Navy Medical Service, also holds the position of 'Head of Navy Healthcare' in Navy Command Headquarters and the present incumbent is Commodore Alison Hofman.

== History ==
The history of the service can be traced back to 1692 when treatment for sick and wounded naval personnel was administered by the Commissioners of the Sick and Hurt Board (a subsidiary body of the Navy Board) until 1806, when medical officers of the Royal Navy had been under the direction of the Transport Board. In 1817 the Transport Board was merged with the Navy Board, and responsibility for medical officers passed to the Victualling Board.

In 1832 the Navy Board and the Victualling Board were both abolished (following recommendations by the First Lord of the Admiralty, Sir James Graham). At the same time, Sir William Burnett (who had served as one of the medical commissioners on the Victualling Board since 1822) was appointed Physician-General of the Navy; as such he had charge of the navy medical department and reported directly to the Board of Admiralty. The title of his post was changed to Inspector-General of Naval Hospitals and Fleets in 1841, and was again changed in 1844 to Director-General of the Medical Department of the Navy. In 1917 following further re-structuring within the Admiralty Department it became known as the Royal Navy Medical Service headed by Medical Director General of the Navy, also known as the Medical Director General (Naval) (which was the official title by the start of the 21st century).

=== Headquarters ===
The Medical Department of the Navy was initially, like its predecessor the Sick and Hurt Board, based in Somerset House. In the 1860s, along with the other Civil Departments of the Admiralty, it was removed from Somerset House to Spring Gardens (where the Admiralty Extension now stands); in 1879 the offices of the director-general were located at 9 New Street, Spring Gardens, London. The director-general was at this time under the direction of the Junior Naval Lord.

In the early 1960s, with the establishment of the Ministry of Defence in place of the Admiralty, the Medical Director General and his staff moved into the Empress State Building. In December 1984 he moved, with a reduced staff, into a new combined Defence Medical Services central headquarters building in First Avenue House, High Holborn, which had been established with a view to bringing together the three medical services under a single administrative head (the Surgeon General); (albeit, in spite of expectations to the contrary, the RN Medical Service and its Army/RAF counterparts maintained their autonomy). In 1993 the office of the Medical Director General moved to Victory Building in HMNB Portsmouth as part of the relocation of the Second Sea Lord and various directorates from London to Portsmouth.

=== Personnel ===
From the early days of the Royal Navy, surgeons had been carried on board ships (albeit intermittently, depending on the length of voyage and likelihood of hostilities). In the Tudor period, surgeons were regulated by the Company of Barber-Surgeons. William Clowes, sometime Warden of the Company, and his colleague John Banister (both of whom had served at sea early in their careers) did much to ensure that naval surgeons were properly qualified and prepared. Clowes emphasized the fact that, although surgeons were prohibited from acting as physicians on land, at sea they would routinely be required to prescribe medicines, administer treatment and offer medical advice; appropriate instruction was provided and Clowes advised ships' captains only to engage as surgeons those whom the Company had approved.

Later, British colonization of the Americas led to longer sea voyages, battles and skirmishes far from home and encounters with new diseases, all of which contributed to a greater regularisation of the naval medical service. In 1629 the Company of Barber-Surgeons was empowered to examine every individual intending to act as a surgeon (on 'any ship whether in the service of the Crown or of a merchant') and likewise to conduct an examination of their surgical instruments and medicine chest prior to their departure. As well as a surgeon, each fighting ship was provided with one or more surgeon's mates (depending on the size and rating of the vessel). Surgeon's mates were recruited from the age of sixteen. A junior rating assigned to assist the Surgeon and mate was known as a loblolly boy.

Physicians, who (unlike most surgeons) were university graduates, were regarded as belonging to a higher social class. Physicians served on the Sick and Hurt Board. In addition, the principal Royal Naval Hospitals at Haslar and Stonehouse (both established in the mid-eighteenth century) were overseen by physicians, with surgeons working under them. Towards the end of the century, superintending physicians were appointed to naval fleets; but (other than when seconded to fleets) physicians did not usually serve at sea. The title of Physician was abolished in the Royal Navy in 1840.

Nursing services in the naval hospitals were initially provided by locally-recruited women, overseen by matrons; but in 1854 the women were (except for a few specialists) dismissed and replaced by men (mostly aged pensioners). Thirty years later, a review of naval nursing provision led to the employment of a number of trained nursing sisters, who would later be constituted as Queen Alexandra's Royal Naval Nursing Service (QARNNS), and the establishment of a Sick Berth staff, to provide nursing assistance afloat as well as ashore.

== Current structure ==
The Medical Branch today is made up of Medical Officers (physicians and surgeons),Medical Assistants (non-commissioned officers and ratings, Allied Healthcare Professionals(Operating Department Practitioners(ODP), Pharmacy Technicians(PT), Paramedics(PM),Biomedical Scientist(BMS)and Radiographers(RAD). Nursing services are provided by QARNNS. In 2012, 1,522 personnel were employed by the service.

Dental services are provided by the Royal Naval Dental Service, which since 1996 has formed part of a tri-service organisation (Defence Dental Services).

=== Medical Assistants ===
Medical Assistants are deployed on all major warships and submarines of the Royal Navy, and provide primary care to the crew. They also have the role of training the crew in first aid. Capital ships often carry non-commissioned medical technicians as part of the larger medical department, who perform laboratory work to aid the medical assistants and officers.

Medical Assistants both male and female provide medical close support and shore side medical care to all Units of 3 Commando Brigade Royal Marines.

All medical assistants are ranked in the same manner as other ratings.

=== Medical Officers ===
Medical Officers may be embarked temporarily on smaller vessels when on a long operational tour, but the Queen Elizabeth-class aircraft carriers have medical departments permanently staffed by one or two medical officers. Medical officers are ranked in the same manner as other officers, but wear red stripes between the gold on their epaulettes, and have the title 'Surgeon' added to their rank (Surgeon Lieutenant for example). All Medical Officers are required to be registered with the General Medical Council and to hold a current licence to practise. Although Royal Navy medical officers are qualified doctors, they do not use the Dr prefix, like those in other British military medical organisations.

=== Medical Services Officers ===
Medical Services Officers provide support in areas such as medical administration, training, logistics and planning, as well as in more specialised areas such as environmental health and radiological protection. They do not have to be registered medical practitioners.

== Head of Royal Navy Medical Services ==
The Head of Navy Healthcare/Head of Royal Navy Medical Services continues to hold the appointment of Medical Director General (Naval).

In 2009 the title Chief Naval Medical Officer was introduced, to be held together with the title Medical Director General (Naval) (which was retained 'for liaison with outside authorities'). In 2015 the rank of the Medical Director General (Naval) was 'de-enriched' from Surgeon Rear Admiral to Surgeon Commodore; Surgeon Commodore Peter Buxton, who was at that time in the discrete post of Head of Royal Naval Medical Service and Assistant Chief of Staff Medical, was the following year promoted to Medical Director General (Naval), retaining in addition the designation Assistant Chief of Staff Medical. Subsequently the separate appointment of Head of Royal Naval Medical Service was merged with that of Assistant Chief of Staff Medical/Medical Director General (Naval). In 2022 the post of Assistant Chief of Staff Medical/Head of the Royal Naval Medical Service was eliminated in favour of the title Head of Navy Healthcare/Head of Royal Navy Medical Services.

As of 2024 the Head of Navy Healthcare/Head of Royal Navy Medical Services reports to the Director of People & Training and Naval Secretary.

=== Physician-General of the Navy ===
- 9 Jun 1832 – 24 January 1841: Sir William Burnett

=== Inspector-General of Naval Hospitals and Fleets ===
- 25 January 1841 – 31 December 1843: Sir William Burnett

=== Director-General of the Medical Department of the Navy ===
- 1 January 1844 – 29 April 1855: Sir William Burnett
- 30 April 1855 – 20 January 1864: Sir John Liddell
- 21 January 1864 – 14 April 1869: Dr Alexander Bryson
- 15 April 1869 – 31 January 1880: Inspector-General of Hospitals and Fleets Sir Alexander Armstrong
- 1 February 1880 – 26 February 1888: Inspector-General of Hospitals and Fleets Sir John Watt Reid
- 27 February 1888 – 31 March 1898: Inspector-General of Hospitals and Fleets Sir James Nicholas Dick
- 1 April 1898 – 11 September 1904: Inspector-General of Hospitals and Fleets Sir Henry Frederick Norbury
- 12 September 1904 – 10 May 1908: Inspector-General of Hospitals and Fleets Sir Herbert Mackay Ellis
- 11 May 1908 – 10 May 1913: Surgeon-General Sir James Porter
- 11 May 1913 – 31 May 1917: Surgeon-General Sir Arthur William May

=== Medical Director-General of the Navy ===
- 1917–1919: Surgeon Vice Admiral Sir William Henry Norman
- 1919–1923: Surgeon Vice Admiral Sir Robert Hill
- 1923–1927: Surgeon Vice Admiral Sir Joseph Chambers
- 1927–1931: Surgeon Vice Admiral Sir Arthur Gaskell
- 1931–1934: Surgeon Vice Admiral Sir Reginald St George Smallridge Bond
- 1934–1937: Surgeon Vice Admiral Sir Robert William Basil Hall
- 1937–1941: Surgeon Vice Admiral Sir Percival Thomas Nicholls
- 1941–1945: Surgeon Vice Admiral Sir Sheldon Francis Dudley
- 1945–1948: Surgeon Vice Admiral Sir Henry St Clair Colson
- 1948–1951: Surgeon Vice Admiral Sir Clarence Edward Greeson
- 1952–1956: Surgeon Vice Admiral Sir Kenneth Alexander Ingleby-Mackenzie
- 1956–1960: Surgeon Vice Admiral Sir Robert Cyril May
- 1960–1963: Surgeon Vice Admiral Sir William Robert Silvester Panckridge
- 1963–1966: Surgeon Vice Admiral Sir Derek Duncombe Steele-Perkins
- 1966–1969: Surgeon Vice Admiral Sir Eric Dick Caldwell
- 1969–1972: Surgeon Vice Admiral Sir Eric Blackburn Bradbury
- 1972–1977: Surgeon Vice Admiral Sir James Watt
- 1977–1980: Surgeon Vice Admiral Sir John Stuart Pepys Rawlins
- 1980–1983: Surgeon Vice Admiral Sir John Albert Bews Harrison

=== Medical Director-General (Naval) ===
- 1983–1984: Surgeon Vice Admiral Roger John William Lambert
- 1985–1990: Surgeon Vice Admiral Sir Godfrey James Milton-Thompson
- 1990–1993: Surgeon Rear Admiral David Askey Lammiman
- 1993–1994: Surgeon Rear Admiral Anthony Leslie Revell
- 1994-1997: Surgeon Rear Admiral Alexander (Sandy) Craig
- 1997–1999: Surgeon Rear Admiral Michael Patrick William Halden Paine
- 1999–2002: Surgeon Rear Admiral Ian Lawrence Jenkins
- 2001–2003: Surgeon Rear Admiral Ralph Donaldson Curr
- 2003–2007: Surgeon Rear Admiral Michael Atholl Farquharson-Roberts
- 2007–2009: Surgeon Rear Admiral Philip Iain Raffaelli
- 2009–2012: Surgeon Rear Admiral Lionel Jarvis (Chief Naval Medical Officer/Medical Director General (Naval))
- 2012–2015: Surgeon Rear Admiral Calum James Gibb McArthur (Chief Naval Medical Officer/Medical Director General (Naval))
- 2015–2016: Surgeon Rear Admiral Alasdair James Walker (Chief Naval Medical Officer/Medical Director General (Naval))
- 2016–2017: Surgeon-Commodore Peter Buxton (Assistant Chief of Staff Medical and Medical Director General (Naval))
- 2017–2021: Commodore Inga Jane Kennedy (Assistant Chief of Staff Medical, Head of the Royal Navy Medical Service and Medical Director General (Naval))
- 2021–2023 Surgeon Commodore Fleur T. Marshall (Head of the Royal Navy Medical Service and Medical Director General (Naval))
- 2023-Present: Commodore Alison Hofman (Head of the Royal Navy Medical Service and Medical Director General (Naval))

== Commodore-in-chief ==
On 8 August 2006 Queen Elizabeth II appointed members of the Royal Family to serve as Royal Patrons, styled Commodores-in-chief, of various Royal Navy Commands, 'in recognition of the strong links between the Royal Navy and the Royal Family'. Camilla, Duchess of Cornwall was appointed Commodore-in-Chief, Naval Medical Services at that time and has continued in the role as Queen.

== See also ==
- Army Medical Services
- RAF Medical Services
- William Job Maillard VC
- Kate Nesbitt MC
- Surgeon Vice Admiral Ian Jenkins
- Surgeon Captain Rick Jolly
- Physician
- Military medicine
