= List of senior female officers of the British Armed Forces =

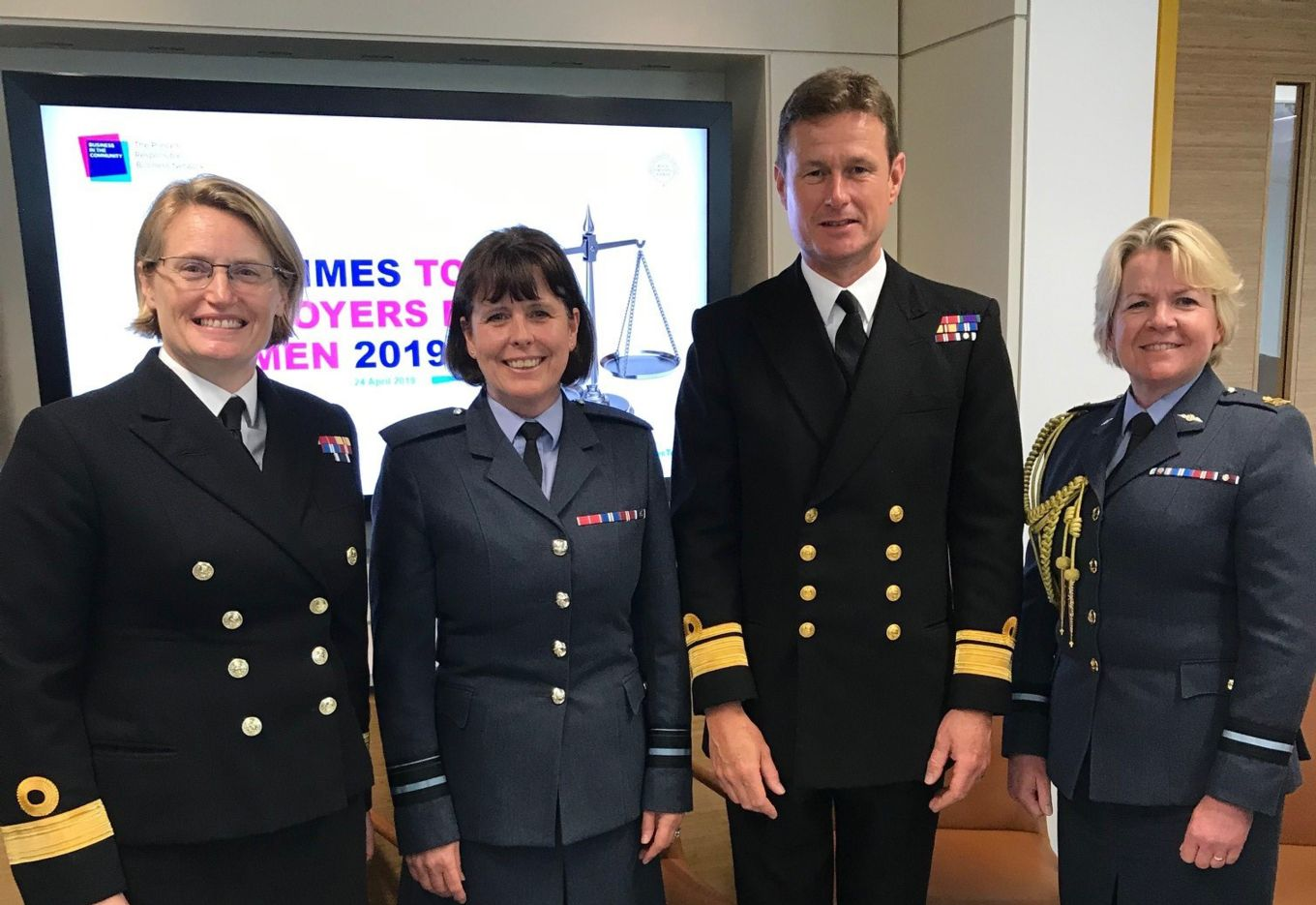
Three senior female officers in 2019: Cdre Eleanor Ablett, AVM Chris Elliot, and Air Cdre Maria Byford

The following is a list of women who have reached general, flag or air officer rank in the Royal Navy, British Army and Royal Air Force, not including those given honorary ranks. An air commodore is considered an air officer rank, and although the equivalent ranks of brigadier or commodore are not considered general or flag rank in their respective services, those who have reached these ranks and above are included in this list.

== Royal Navy ==
Name	Image	Rank	Date of promotion	Active/Retired
Jude Terry		Rear Admiral	17 January 2022	Active
Fleur Marshall		Surgeon Rear Admiral	21 March 2023	Active
Fiona R. Shepherd		Rear Admiral	1 October 2024	Active
Rachel M. Singleton		Rear Admiral	1 October 2024	Active
Carolyn Stait		Commodore	22 June 2004	Retired
Inga Kennedy		Commodore	9 February 2015	Active
Eleanor L. Ablett		Commodore	28 August 2018	Retired
Melanie S. Robinson		Commodore RNR	4 February 2020	Retired
Alison J. Hofman		Commodore	17 August 2020	Active
Sharon L. Malkin		Commodore	2 June 2021	Active
Joanna L. Adey		Commodore	25 July 2023	Active
Suzi Nielsen		Commodore	2 January 2024	Active
Sarah E. Oakley		Commodore	24 February 2025	Active

== British Army ==
Name	Image	Rank	Date of promotion	Active/Retired
Sharon Nesmith		General	10 June 2024	Active
Anna-Lee Reilly		Lieutenant General	18 August 2025	Active
Susan Ridge		Major General	20 September 2015	Retired
Celia J. Harvey		Major General	11 March 2020	Active (reservist)
Sarah Johansen		Major General	26 June 2023	Active
Lisa C. Keetley		Major General	2 September 2024	Active
Patricia Purves		Brigadier	30 June 1999	Retired
Nicky Moffat		Brigadier	30 June 2009	Retired
Fiona H. Gardner		Brigadier	30 June 2015	Retired
Suzanne Anderson		Brigadier	31 December 2015	Active
Caroline L. Hull		Brigadier	30 June 2020	Active
Sara L. Sharkey		Brigadier	30 June 2017	Active
Ingrid A. Rolland		Brigadier	4 December 2017	Active (Reservist)
Anna Clare Luedicke		Brigadier	30 June 2017	Active
Vivienne Wendy Buck		Brigadier	30 June 2019	Retired
Janice A. Cook		Brigadier	30 June 2019	Deceased
Alison L. Curnow		Brigadier	30 June 2020	Active
Elizabeth J. Faithfull-Davies		Brigadier	30 June 2020	Active
Caroline Hull		Brigadier	30 June 2020	Active
Clare Philips		Brigadier	30 June 2021	Active
Gillian Wilkinson		Brigadier	28 April 2022	Active (Reservist)
Lucinda Westerman		Brigadier	30 June 2021	Active

== Royal Air Force ==
Name	Image	Rank	Date of promotion	Active/Retired
Sue Gray		Air Marshal	29 March 2019	Retired
Clare Walton		Air Marshal	3 July 2023	Active
Elaine West		Air Vice-Marshal	1 August 2013	Active (reservist)
Christina Elliot		Air Vice-Marshal	1 July 2016	Retired
Alison Mardell		Air Vice-Marshal	29 April 2017	Retired
Tamara Jennings		Air Vice-Marshal	29 September 2018	Active
Maria Byford		Air Vice-Marshal	24 February 2020	Retired
Suraya A. Marshall		Air Vice-Marshal	6 October 2021	Active
Barbara Cooper		Air Commodore	1 January 2008	Retired
Jayne Millington		Air Commodore	2012	Deceased
Dawn McCafferty		Air Commodore	17 August 2012	Retired
Suzanne N. Perkins		Air Commodore	21 August 2017	Active
Catherine C. Coton		Air Commodore	4 September 2017	Retired
Wendy Rothery		Air Commodore	2 April 2018	Active
