= Dick Caldwell =

British naval officer (1909–2000)

Surgeon Vice-Admiral Sir Eric Dick Caldwell KBE CB FRCP FRCPE (6 July 1909 – 11 July 2000) was a Royal Navy officer.

Educated at the University of Edinburgh, Caldwell entered the Royal Navy in 1934. He survived two torpedoings in the Second World War. After a succession of clinical appointments, he joined the Admiralty Medical Board in 1961. He was appointed Surgeon Rear-Admiral in 1963 and was then finally promoted to Surgeon Vice-Admiral in 1966, when he was appointed Medical Director-General (Naval), serving until he retired in 1969. On retirement, he was appointed a Knight Commander of the Order of the British Empire.

== Early life ==
The son of a doctor, Caldwell was born in 1909. He attended the University of Edinburgh, graduating MB ChB in 1933. He briefly worked in a casualty ward before supporting his father's work.

== Military career ==
On 20 September 1934, Caldwell was commissioned into the Royal Navy as a Surgeon Lieutenant. He served in the East Indies, at Portsmouth, in the Royal Marine Infirmary and on RFA Maine, before a brief spell on HMS Royal Oak; he survived the latter's sinking in 1939. He was promoted to Surgeon Lieutenant-Commander in 1940. In 1941, he was posted to HMS Prince of Wales, and survived that ship's torpedoing as well. He was subsequently give a succession of clinical positions during the remainder of the Second World War, culminating in his appointed as principal medical officer on HMS Euroclydon in Malta. After further training, Caldwell served at the Royal Naval Hospital Hong Kong from 1947 to 1950; he was promoted to Surgeon Commander on 30 June 1949. He was awarded an MD in 1950.

Caldwell then had positions at HMS Ganges (1950 to 1952) and Britannia Royal Naval College (1952 to 1955). From 1956 to 1958, he was the Senior Medical Specialist at the Royal Naval Hospital Haslar. He was promoted to Surgeon Captain on 31 December 1957. In 1958, he became Senior Medical Specialist to the Royal Navy families in Malta. He was appointed to the Admiralty Medical Board in 1961. He was promoted to Surgeon Rear-Admiral on 24 October 1963 and was also appointed an Honorary Physician to the Queen. From 1963 to 1966, he was Medical Officer in charge of the Royal Naval Hospital, Plymouth. He was appointed a Companion of the Order of the Bath (CB) in 1965. Caldwell was then finally promoted to Surgeon Vice-Admiral on 24 October 1966, and appointed Medical Director-General (Naval) in 1966, serving until he retired on 11 August 1969. On retirement, he was appointed a Knight Commander of the Order of the British Empire (KBE). He had, by that time, been elected a Fellow of the Royal College of Physicians of Edinburgh in 1962 and a Fellow of the Royal College of Physicians in 1968.

== Later life ==
Caldwell finally worked as Executive Director of the Medical Council on Alcoholism from 1970 to 1979. He died on 11 July 2000. His wife Margery Lee Abbott had predeceased him.
