= Eric Bradbury (Royal Navy officer) =

Surgeon Vice-Admiral Sir Eric Bradbury KBE CB FRCS
- Born: 2 March 1911; County Antrim
- Died: 6 January 2003 (aged 91)
- Military career
- Allegiance: United Kingdom
- Branch: Royal Navy
- Rank: Surgeon Vice-Admiral
- Awards: Knight Commander of the Order of the British Empire, Companion of the Order of the Bath

Surgeon Vice-Admiral Sir Eric Blackburn Bradbury KBE CB FRCS (2 March 1911 – 6 January 2003) was a British Royal Navy medical officer who served as Medical Director-General of the Royal Navy Medical Service.

He was born in Maze, County Antrim, Northern Ireland and educated at the Royal Belfast Academical Institution and Queen's University Belfast. After graduating MB in 1934, he joined the Royal Navy as a Surgeon Lieutenant. From 1935 to 1936, Bradbury served in HMS Barham, Endeavour and Cumberland and at Royal Navy shore hospitals in Haslar, Chatham, Plymouth and Malta. During the Second World War, he served on HMS Charybdis and HM Hospital Ship Oxfordshire.

In 1966, Bradbury was promoted to Surgeon Rear Admiral and appointed medical officer in charge of Haslar Hospital, the Royal Navy's senior teaching hospital. He was also the commanding medical officer of Portsmouth and an honorary physician to the Queen. Bradbury was made a Companion of the Bath (CB) in the 1968 New Year Honours.

In 1969, he was appointed Medical Director of the Royal Naval Medical Service, a post he held until 1972. In 1971, Bradbury was promoted Surgeon Vice Admiral and made a Knight Commander of the British Empire in the 1971 Birthday Honours. He was admitted a Fellow of the Royal College of Surgeons in 1972.

Bradbury died in 2003 and was buried in Tunbridge Wells, Kent. He had married in 1939 Elizabeth Constance Austin, with whom he had 3 daughters.

The National Portrait Gallery has two photographic portraits of Bradbury.
