= William Burnett (physician) =

British physician (1779–1861)

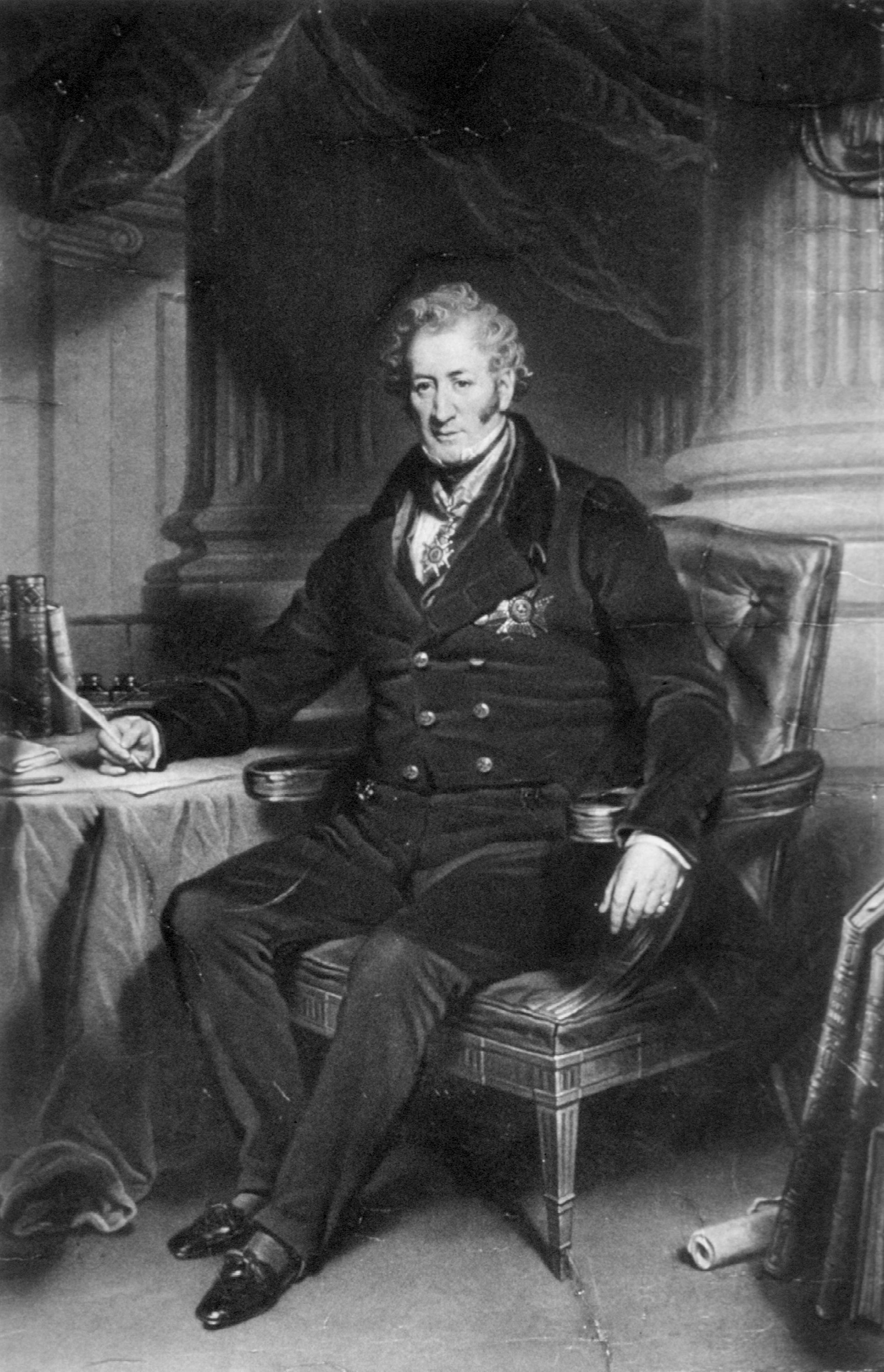
Sir William Burnett by Sir Martin Archer Shee (c. 1841)

Sir William Burnett, KCB, FRS (16 January 1779 – 16 February 1861) was a British physician who served as Physician-General of the Royal Navy.

== Early life ==
Burnett was born in Montrose, Scotland on 16 January 1779 and attended Montrose Grammar School. He was appointed surgeon's mate on board the Edgar soon after his arrival at Edinburgh to pursue his medical studies. Later he served as assistant-surgeon in the Goliath under Sir John Jervis, and was present at St. Vincent and the siege of Cadiz. He also served with distinction at battles of the Nile and Trafalgar.

== Prison hospitals ==
Between 1805 and 1810 Burnett was in charge of the hospitals for prisoners of war at Portsmouth and Forton. His diligence in his most arduous hospital duties recommended Burnett in 1810 for the office of Physician and Inspector of Hospitals to the Mediterranean Fleet. His health deteriorated and he returned to England towards the end of 1813; but in March 1814 he was able to undertake the medical charge of the Russian fleet in the Medway, which was suffering severely from fever. He combined with this the charge of the prisoners of war at Chatham, among whom a virulent fever was raging. On the completion of this service Burnett settled at Chichester as a physician until 1822, when Lord Melville offered him a seat at the Victualling Board as colleague of Dr. Weir, then Chief Medical Officer of the Navy.

== Physician-General ==
Later he became Physician-General of the Royal Navy (later renamed Director-General of the Medical Department of the Navy) and introduced valuable reforms, including requiring regular classified returns of diseases from naval medical officers, urging the erection of, and largely planned, the Melville Hospital at Chatham for naval patients, and introducing more humane treatment of naval lunatics at Haslar.

In 1841, the naval medical corps testified their high regard for the benefits he had conferred on the service by presenting him with his full-length portrait by Sir Martin Archer Shee and a service of plate. He was largely instrumental in securing a better position for assistant-surgeons in the navy.

Burnett was an elected a Fellow of the Royal Society in 1833. He was knighted on 25 May 1831, appointed physician-in-ordinary to King William IV on 13 April 1835, and soon after created a Knight Commander of the Royal Guelphic Order. He was promoted to Knight Commander of the Order of the Bath by Queen Victoria in 1850.

Burnett retired in 1855 and was succeeded as Director-General by Sir John Liddell. On retirement he settled at Chichester, where he died on 16 February 1861.

Burnett Bay in the Northwest Territories, Canada was named for Burnett.

== Burnettizing ==
In 1839 Burnett was granted a British patent for Burnettizing, the application under pressure of an aqueous solution of zinc chloride to ropes, canvas and timber as a preservative. The Admiralty found the process to be effective but when Burnett attempted to diversify into business on his own behalf, particularly the supply of treatments for railway construction timbers, it was to the detriment of his naval career.

== Publications ==
An Account of the Effect of Mercurial Vapours on the Crew of His Majesty's Ship Triumph, in the Year 1810 - William Burnett (1823)
