= Burnett Bay =

Bay in the Northwest Territories, Canada

- Location within Northwest Territories
- Location: Banks Island
- Coordinates: 73°45′02″N 124°00′12″W
- Ocean/sea sources: Arctic Ocean
- Basin countries: Canada
- Settlements: Uninhabited

Burnett Bay is a Canadian Arctic waterway in the Northwest Territories. It is an eastern arm of the Arctic Ocean's Beaufort Sea on northwestern Banks Island. Robillard Island, Norway Island, and Bernard Island lie outside the bay's mouth in a semicircle. The bay was named for William Burnett, Director-General of the Medical Department of the Navy, by Robert McClure during the McClure Arctic expedition.
