= Fleur Marshall =

Royal Navy Surgeon Rear Admiral and general practitioner (born 1972)

Surgeon Rear Admiral Fleur Marshall KHP
- Born: 1972 (age 53–54)
- Education: Bristol University
- Military career
- Allegiance: United Kingdom
- Branch: Royal Navy
- Service years: 1992–present
- Rank: Surgeon Rear Admiral
- Commands: Royal Navy Medical Service

Surgeon Rear Admiral Fleur T. Marshall KHP (born January 1972) is an English general practitioner and senior Royal Navy officer. Since 2021, she has served as head of the Royal Navy Medical Service and Medical Director General (Naval).

== Early life and education ==
Marshall was educated at Repton School, an independent school in Repton, Derbyshire. She studied at Bristol University.

== Military career ==
In 1992, Marshall joined the Royal Navy as a medical cadet while still a student at university. As a general duties medical officer, she served at sea aboard HMS Norfolk, HMS Leeds Castle, and HMS Boxer, and on shore at HMS Drake and Royal Marines Barracks Stonehouse. She completed her general practitioner training in 2003. She was promoted to surgeon commander on 20 August 2007, and to surgeon captain on 20 August 2013.

She became Regional Clinical Director (South) in 2013, and then medical officer in charge of the Institute of Naval Medicine in September 2016. She was awarded the Naval Long Service and Good Conduct Medal with clasp in 2018. She was appointed Head of Future Healthcare in 2019, and promoted to surgeon commodore on 26 February 2019.

In April 2021, she was appointed head of the Royal Navy Medical Service and Medical Director General (Naval). She was also appointed an Honorary Physician (QHP) to Queen Elizabeth II on 24 May 2021. Following the death of Queen Elizabeth, she became an Honorary Physician (KHP) to King Charles III.

On 21 March 2023, Marshall was promoted to the rank of rear admiral, making her the second woman in the history of the Royal Navy to achieve this rank behind Rear Admiral Jude Terry.

== See also ==
- List of senior female officers of the British Armed Forces

Military offices
Preceded by Inga Kennedy	Head of the Royal Navy Medical Service and Medical Director General (Naval); 2021–Present	Incumbent
