= Alexander Bryson (surgeon) =

Scottish naval surgeon and medical writer (1802–1869)

Alexander Bryson CB FRS FRCP FFPS
- Born: 1802
- Died: 12 September, 1869 (aged 66–67)
- Occupation: Medical writer
- Medical career
- Profession: Surgeon

Alexander Bryson, CB, FRS, FRCP, FFPS (1802–1869) was a Scottish naval surgeon and medical writer. He was educated at Edinburgh and Glasgow, entered the Royal Navy as assistant-surgeon in 1827, and rose to become director-general of the naval medical department in 1864.

== Life ==
Alexander Bryson began his professional studies at Edinburgh and continued them at Glasgow, where he took his doctor's degree and was admitted a member of the Faculty of Physicians and Surgeons. He also became a fellow of the Royal College of Physicians, London. He entered the Royal Navy as assistant-surgeon in 1827, and was promoted to the rank of surgeon in 1836, deputy inspector-general in 1854, and inspector-general in 1855. In January 1864, on the retirement of Sir John Liddell, he was appointed director-general of the medical department of the Navy, from which post he retired on 15 April 1869. He was appointed honorary physician to Queen Victoria in 1859, and subsequently he was made a companion of the Order of the Bath. He was also a fellow of the Royal Society. His death took place at Barnes, Surrey, on 12 December 1869.

== Works ==
He was the author of a treatise on The Climate and Diseases of the African Station, and of an eight-volume series titled An Account of the Origin, Spread, and Decline of the Epidemic levers of Sierra Leone. He also contributed an article "On Medicine and Medical Statistics" to the Admiralty Manual of Scientific Enquiry.

== Sources ==
- Mills, James (2012). "Bryson, Alexander (1802–1869), naval surgeon". Oxford Dictionary of National Biography (online ed.). Oxford University Press. doi:10.1093/ref:odnb/3818. (Subscription, Wikipedia Library access or UK public library membership required.)

Attribution:

- This article incorporates text from a publication now in the public domain: Cooper, Thompson (1886). "Bryson, Alexander". In Stephen, Leslie (ed.). Dictionary of National Biography. Vol. 7. London: Smith, Elder & Co. p. 169.
