= John Watt Reid =

Scottish medical director-general of the Royal Navy

Sir John Watt Reid KCB
- Born: 25 February 1823; Edinburgh
- Died: 24 February 1909 (aged 85); London
- Occupation: Medical director-general
- Spouse: Georgina Hill (m. 1863)

Sir John Watt Reid KCB (25 February 1823 – 24 February 1909) was a Scottish medical director-general of the Royal Navy.

== Biography ==
Reid was born in Edinburgh on 25 February 1823. He was the younger son of John Watt Reid, surgeon in the navy by his wife Jane, daughter of James Henderson, an Edinburgh merchant. Educated at Edinburgh Academy, at the university there, and at the extramural medical school, he qualified L.R.C.S. Edinburgh in 1844. He entered the navy as an assistant surgeon on 6 February 1845, and after serving a commission on board the Rodney in the Channel was appointed in March 1849 to the naval hospital, Plymouth, and received the approval of the Admiralty for his services there during the cholera epidemic of that year. In January 1852 he was appointed as acting surgeon to the Inflexible, sloop, in the Mediterranean; on 12 September 1854 he was promoted to surgeon, and in June 1855 appointed to the London, line-of-battle ship, on the same station. In these two ships he served in the Black Sea until the fall of Sevastopol, and received the Crimean and Turkish medals with the Sevastopol clasp, and was also thanked by the commander-in-chief James Whitley Deans Dundas for his services to the crew of the flagship when stricken with cholera in 1854. In 1856 he took the degree of M.D. at Aberdeen; and, after serving for a short time in the flagship at Devonport, was appointed in April 1857 to the Belleisle, hospital ship, on board which he continued during the China war of 1857–9, for which he received the medal. In January 1860 he was appointed to the Nile, of 90 guns, and served in her for four years on the North American station, after which he went to Haslar hospital until promoted to staff surgeon on 6 September 1866. After a year's further service in the Mediterranean, he was in June 1870 placed in charge of the naval hospital at Haulbowline, where he remained till 1873. During the concluding months of the Third Anglo-Ashanti War he served on board the Nebraska, hospital ship, at Cape Coast Castle, for which he was mentioned in despatches, received the medal and, on 31 March 1874, was promoted to deputy inspector-general. In that rank he had charge of the medical establishments at Bermuda from 1875 to 1878, when he was appointed to Haslar hospital. On 25 February 1880 he was promoted to be inspector-general and was appointed medical director-general of the navy. This post he held till his retirement eight years later, when the board of admiralty recorded their high opinion of his zeal and efficiency. He became an honorary physician to Queen Victoria in Feb. 1881 and to King Edward VII in 1901, was awarded the K.C.B. (military) on 24 November 1882, and had the honorary degree of LL.D. conferred upon him by Edinburgh University at its tercentenary in 1884. A medical good service pension was awarded him in July 1888.

Reid died in London on 24 February 1909, and was buried at Bramshaw, Hampshire.

== Personal life ==
He married, on 6 July 1863, Georgina, daughter of C. J. Hill of Halifax, Nova Scotia.
