= Sick and Hurt Commissioners =

Sick and Hurt Board

Agency overview
- Formed: (1653–1806)
- Jurisdiction: Kingdom of England Kingdom of Great Britain United Kingdom
- Headquarters: London
- Agency executive: Chairman of the Board
- Parent agency: Admiralty

The Sick and Hurt Commissioners (also known as the Sick and Hurt Board, but formally and fully titled The Commissioners for taking Care of Sick and Wounded Seamen and for the Care and Treatment of Prisoners of War) were responsible for medical services in the Royal Navy. They were a separate (but subsidiary) body to the Navy Board, supplying surgeons to naval ships, providing them with medicines and equipment, and running shore and ship hospitals; they were also responsible for prisoners of war.

== Origins ==
The Commissioners were established on a permanent footing from 1715 to 1806, however a series of temporary Commissions had been established prior to this date, particularly at time of war, beginning under the Commonwealth in 1653. Commissions were set up for the duration of the Anglo-Dutch Wars in 1665-7 and 1672–4. The Fifth Commission for Sick, Wounded and Prisoners, inaugurated in 1702, was instrumental in setting up Royal Naval Hospitals in naval ports both at home and abroad.

They were responsible for the relief of sick or wounded seamen; at first the relief they provided was of an improvised nature. The Royal Greenwich Hospital, a home for superannuated seamen, had only a limited number of places for invalids; no naval hospitals were especially built until the middle of the eighteenth century, though hospital ships were employed intermittently from at least as early as the mid-seventeenth century. On board ship surgeons with warrant rank had been carried since the seventeenth century.

Between 1692 and 1702 and between 1713 and 1715 their duties were performed by the Commissioners of the Register Office and from 1715 until 1717 by two Commissioners of the Navy Board. One Commissioner each from the Sick and Hurt Board and the Navy Board then conducted the business from the Navy Office until 1740, when at least two Commissioners of the Sick and Hurt Board were appointed during peace and up to five in wartime. This Board appointed ships' surgeons and their assistants, ensured that they were equipped and supplied with medicines, superintended the dispensers who issued medicines, supervised the furnishing and equipment of hospitals and hospital ships, examined and cleared accounts and made returns of the sick and wounded to the Admiralty and Navy Boards. In 1743 the Board was also made responsible for the care of prisoners of war.

The Sick and Hurt Board was responsible for the management of Royal Naval Hospitals and the early version of the Royal Navy Medical Service, although until 1796 it neither examined nor appointed naval surgeons. From 1740 the Sick and Hurt Board was in addition charged with the care and exchange of prisoners of war of all services, both enemy in British hands and British in enemy hands. In the Sick and Hurt Board's records both medical and prisoner-of-war business was generally mixed.

== Demise and aftermath ==
In 1796 responsibility for prisoners of war was transferred to the Transport Board. The Transport Board was given full responsibility for the care of prisoners of war on 22 December 1799, and in 1805 the Transport Board had taken over the business of the Sick and Hurt Board. In 1806 the Sick and Hurt Board was wound up and its medical duties also transferred to the Transport Board, which now had a medical commissioner. When the Transport Board was itself abolished in 1817, the medical side of its work, together with the medical commissioner, was transferred to the Victualling Board. On the abolition of the Victualling Board in 1832, the erstwhile medical commissioner was designated Physician General of the Navy; as such he had charge of all medical stores, instruments and medicines, and was 'to superintend all professional details connected with the various medical establishments'. (This was part of a process by which the civil departments of the Navy, formerly overseen by the Navy Board, were instead placed under the direct control of the Board of Admiralty; each department now had its own principal officer, and also a designated Superintending Lord as its representative on the Board).

In 1841 the Physician General was renamed Inspector-General of Naval Hospitals and Fleets, and in 1844 Director General of the Medical Department. At the same time ships' surgeons were given commissioned status.

== Commissioners ==
Commissioners include:

- Thomas Clifford
- John Evelyn
- Samuel Pepys
- John Home

== Scurvy ==
The Sick and Hurt Commissioners are credited with the eradication of scurvy from the Royal Navy by putting to use the ideas of Johann Bachstrom and James Lind, who believed lemons, limes or other citrus fruits could help prevent the disease. In his 1734 book Observationes circa scorbutum ("Observations on Scurvy"), Bachstrom wrote that:

scurvy is solely owing to a total abstinence from fresh vegetable food, and greens; which is alone the primary cause of the disease.

Lind's essay on the most effectual means of preserving the health of seamen appeared in 1753. It was Gilbert Blane who implemented a longer trial of citrus fruit. In an experiment in 1794, lemon juice was issued on board HMS Suffolk on a twenty-three-week, non-stop voyage to India. The daily ration of two-thirds of an ounce mixed in grog contained just about the minimum daily intake of 10 mg vitamin C. There was no serious outbreak of scurvy. The following year, the Admiralty took up the general issue of lemon juice to the whole fleet.

== Structure of the Board ==
Included.

- Prisoner of War Department, (1653–1796), Responsibility for naval hospitals was transferred to the Transport Board
- Royal Naval Hospital, (1753–1806), Responsibility for naval hospitals was transferred to the Transport Board

== Timeline ==
Note: Below is a timeline of responsibility for medical services for the Royal Navy.

- Navy Board, Sick and Hurt Board (Office of the Commissioners of Sick and Wounded Seamen), 1653–1806
- Navy Board, Victualling Board, 1683–1793
- Navy Board, Transport Board, 1794–1817
- Board of Admiralty, Department of the Physician of the Navy, 1832–1835
- Board of Admiralty, Department of the Physician General of the Navy, 1835–1843
- Board of Admiralty, Department of the Inspector-General of Naval Hospitals and Fleets, 1843–1844
- Board of Admiralty, Director-General Medical Department of the Navy, 1844–1917
- Board of Admiralty, Medical Director General of the Navy, Royal Navy Medical Service, 1917–1964

== Attribution ==
- Source:Royal Museums Greenwich

This article contains text from this source http://collections.rmg.co.uk/page/7d7ded6fb50d6031e2884961a200be58.html, which is available under the Open Government Licence v3.0. © Crown copyright.

- Source: National Archives

This article contains text from this source http://discovery.nationalarchives.gov.uk/details/r/C707, which is available under the Open Government Licence v3.0. © Crown copyright.
