= Anna-Lee Reilly =

British engineer and army officer

Lieutenant General Anna-Lee Reilly CB FREng
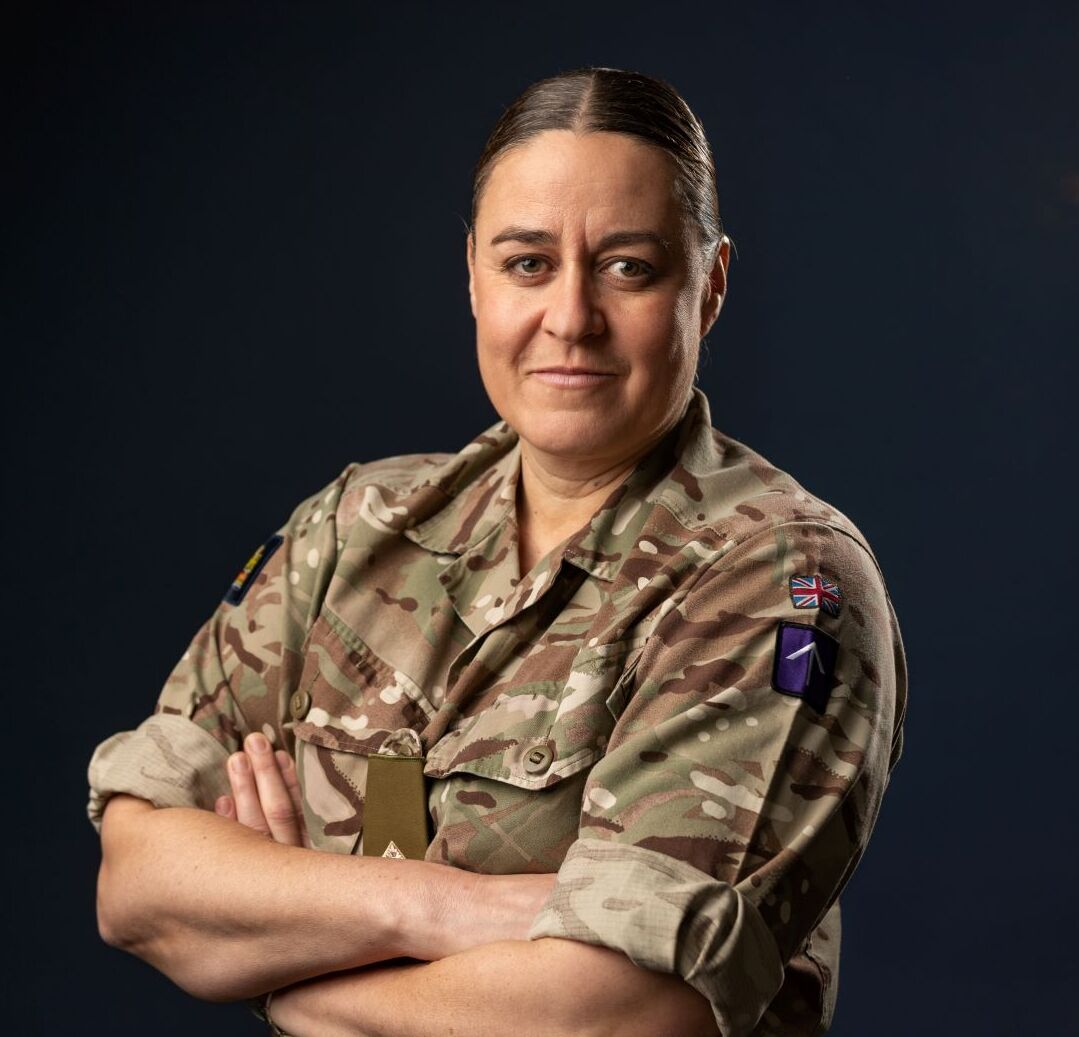
- Born: Anna-Lee Shorters; 31 December 1974 (age 51)
- Education: Cranfield University; King's College London
- Military career
- Allegiance: United Kingdom
- Branch: British Army
- Service years: 1997–present
- Rank: Lieutenant General
- Unit: Royal Electrical and Mechanical Engineers
- Conflicts: Iraq War

Lieutenant General Anna-Lee Reilly (née Shorters; born 31 December 1974) is a British engineer and British Army officer. Her early career was spent with Royal Electrical and Mechanical Engineers, as a staff officer, and then working for Defence Equipment and Support within the Ministry of Defence.

== Early life and education ==
Reilly was born on 31 December 1974 in Exeter, Devon, England. She studied information systems and management at Cranfield University, graduating with a Bachelor of Science (BSc) degree in 1996. She later undertook two master's degrees: a Master of Science (MSc) degree in designing information systems at Cranfield (2006); and a Master of Arts (MA) degree at King's College London in defence studies (2012). She is undertaking a doctorate at King's College London focused on the integration of women into the British Army.

== Military career ==
Reilly joined the Royal Military Academy Sandhurst in 1997. She became interested in engineering after being commissioned to the Royal Electrical and Mechanical Engineers (REME). She was commissioned in the REME, British Army, as a second lieutenant on 13 December 1997, with seniority in that rank from 10 December 1994, and was promoted the same day to lieutenant with seniority from 10 December 1996. She was promoted to captain on 13 June 2000. She was an assistant equerry to Prince Philip, Duke of Edinburgh between 2003 and 2008. She was the first female engineering officer attached to the Household Cavalry Regiment, commanding a Light Aid Detachment that deployed with them during Op TELIC (Iraq War). Having attended Staff College, she was promoted to major on 31 July 2005. She also commanded REME troops in Germany, Bosnia, and Kosovo.

In 2013, Reilly was promoted to lieutenant colonel. From 2013 to 2016, she was commanding officer of 4 Armoured Close Support Battalion REME. Since then she has been responsible for the deployment of UK troops overseas. In 2022, Reilly was appointed Defence Equipment and Support (DE&S) Director of Operations. The Operations Directorate brings people together from across DE&S to increase the UK's ability to support the Armed Forces of Ukraine. Her team was recognised at the Government Commercial Function Awards in 2023 with the Best Team of the Year and the Overall 2023 Commercial Excellence Award.

On 18 August 2025, Reilly was appointed Director General Core Delivery for DE&S and promoted to lieutenant general. She is only the second woman in the British Army and the sixth REME officer to reach the rank of lieutenant general.

Reilly was appointed Fellow of the Royal Academy of Engineering in 2024. In the 2024 King's Birthday Honours, she was appointed Companion of the Order of the Bath (CB).
