= Inga Kennedy =

Scottish nurse and senior Royal Navy officer

Commodore Inga Kennedy CBE VR QHNS
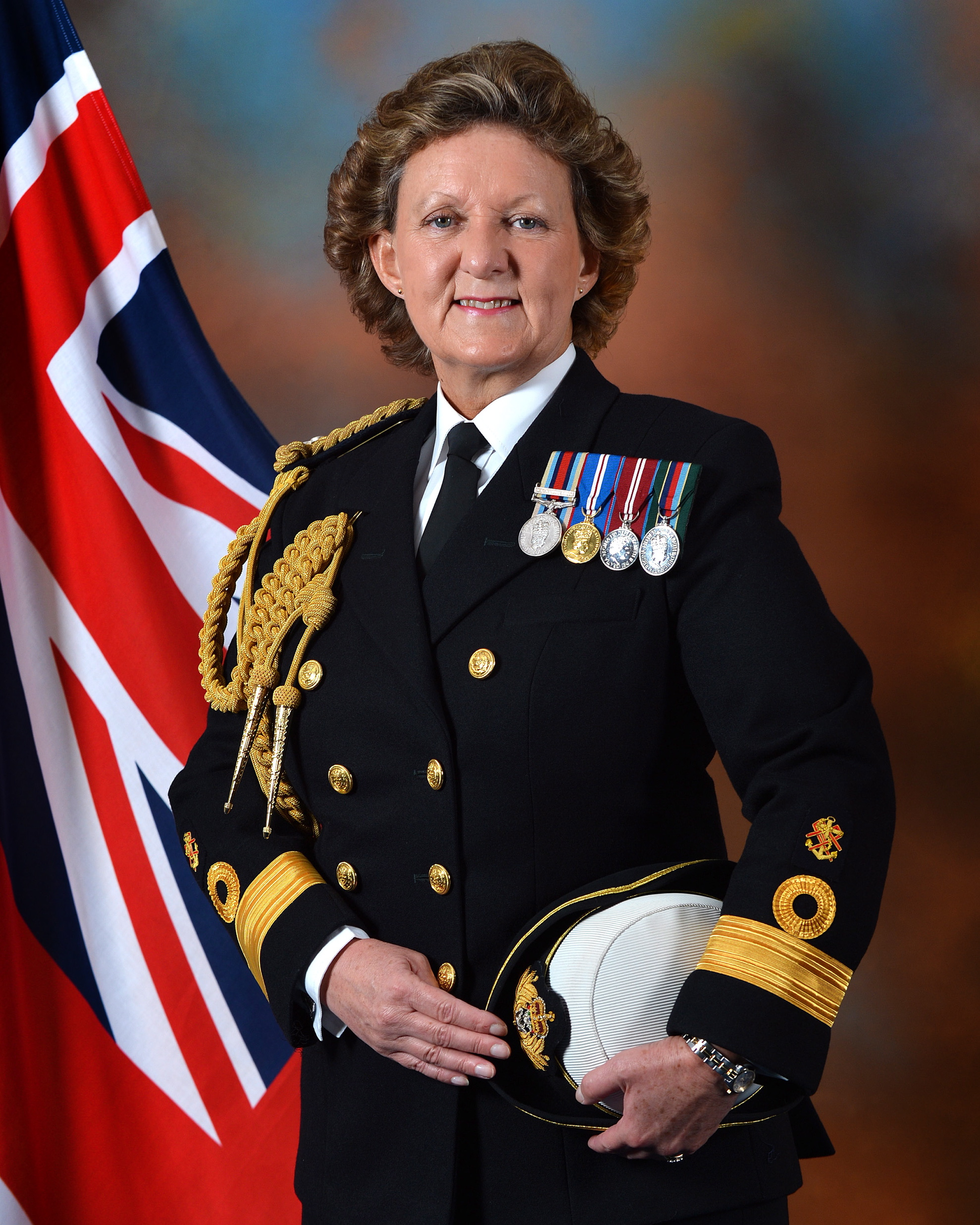
- Commodore Kennedy in 2015
- Born: Inga Jane Kennedy; 7 September 1962 (age 64); Aberdeen, Scotland
- Relatives: Mark Durkan (m. 2014)
- Military career
- Allegiance: United Kingdom
- Branch: Royal Navy
- Service years: 1987–2021
- Rank: Commodore
- Commands: Royal Navy Medical Service; Queen Alexandra's Royal Naval Nursing Service
- Conflicts: War in Afghanistan
- Awards: Commander of the Order of the British Empire; Volunteer Reserves Service Medal

Commodore Inga Jane Kennedy, CBE, VR, QHNS (born 7 September 1962) is a Scottish nurse and retired senior Royal Navy officer. From 2017 to 2021, she served as head of the Royal Navy Medical Service and Medical Director General (Naval). She was the most senior female officer in the Royal Navy by year of promotion. She previously served as Matron-in-Chief of the Queen Alexandra's Royal Naval Nursing Service (2011–2015) and Inspector General of the Defence Medical Services (2015–2017).

== Early life and education ==
Kennedy was born on 7 September 1962 in Aberdeen, Scotland to Rhoda and Richard Kennedy. She studied nursing at Queen Margaret University, Edinburgh, graduating with a Bachelor of Arts (BA) degree. She also studied for a postgraduate diploma at the University of Greenwich.

== Nursing career ==
Kennedy is a Registered Nurse (RN) and a Registered Midwife (RM). She worked as a nurse in the National Health Service (NHS) from 1980 to 2000.

=== Military service ===
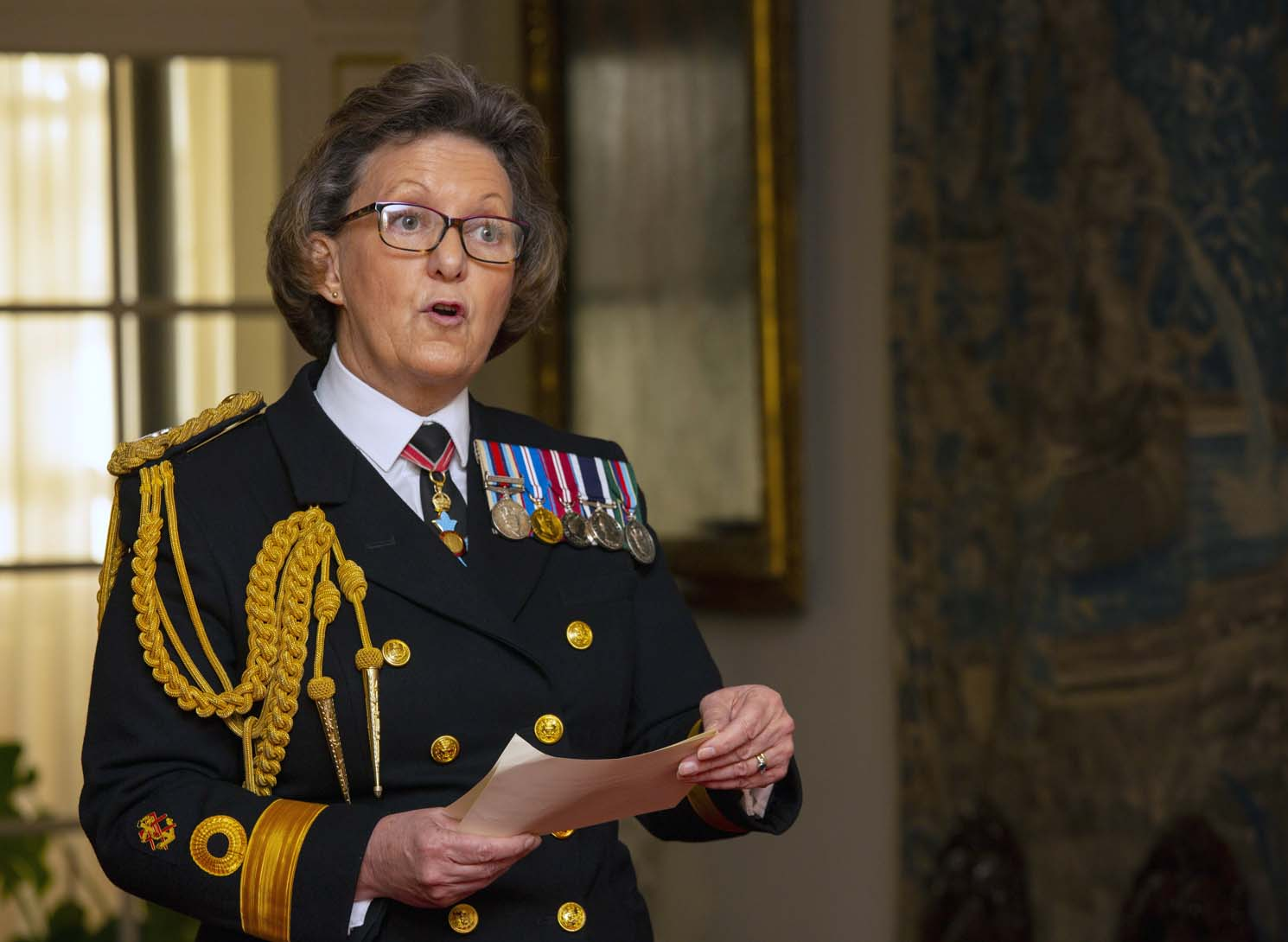
Kennedy in 2018

Kennedy's military service began as a reservist: she joined the Royal Naval Reserve in 1987. From 1998 to 2000, she undertook full-time reserve service and was a Senior Midwife in the Royal Naval Hospital Gibraltar.

In 2000, Kennedy moved from the reserves to join the regular Queen Alexandra's Royal Naval Nursing Service (QARNNS). She was promoted to commander on 30 June 2005. She served in Afghanistan at the Joint Forces Command in 2011. She was promoted to captain on 21 November 2011.

From 2011 to 2015, she served as Matron-in-Chief (i.e. head) of the QARNNS. She was also Deputy Assistant Chief of Staff (Healthcare) at Navy Command Headquarters from 2012 to 2015. She was promoted to commodore on 9 February 2015. From 2015 to 2017, she served as Inspector General of the Defence Medical Services and was based at the Headquarters of the Surgeon General. In this role, she was responsible for inspecting medical departments across the armed forces, be it a sick bay on a ship or a hospital in a foreign posting. In 2017, she was appointed Head of the Royal Naval Medical Service and Medical Director General (Naval). As such, she was also a member of the Second Sea Lord's Board of Management and serves as the medical adviser to the Admiralty Board.

Kennedy retired from the Royal Navy on 1 September 2021.

== Personal life ==
In 2014, Kennedy married Mark Durkan.

== Honours ==

In 2012, Kennedy was appointed an Honorary Nursing Sister to The Queen (QHNS). In the 2017 New Year Honours, she was appointed a Commander of the Order of the British Empire (CBE) in recognition of her service with the Defence Medical Services. She is also a recipient of the Operational Service Medal for Afghanistan, the Queen's Golden Jubilee Medal, the Queen's Diamond Jubilee Medal, the Volunteer Reserves Service Medal (for 10 years service in the reserve), and the Naval Long Service and Good Conduct Medal (for 15 years service in the regulars).

In June 2021, Saga Cruises announced in a press release that Commodore Inga J. Kennedy CBE QHNS QARNNS, has been named godmother of Saga Cruises’ newest ship, the spirit of adventure. Kennedy has followed the footsteps of HRH The Duchess of Cornwall, who was Godmother to sister ship Spirit of Discovery.

Military offices
Preceded by Peter Buxton	Head of the Royal Navy Medical Service and Medical Director General (Naval); 2017-2021	Succeeded by Fleur Marshall
