= Railway stations not officially closed with no services in the United Kingdom =

Some railway stations in the United Kingdom have no services on offer from them, which renders the station effectively closed. These stations do not appear in the rail usage figures of the Office of Rail & Road as the stations receive no passengers. In order for the station to officially close, the Department for Transport is required to launch a consultation process before formally closing, under the provisions of the Railways Act 2005.

== Staffordshire ==
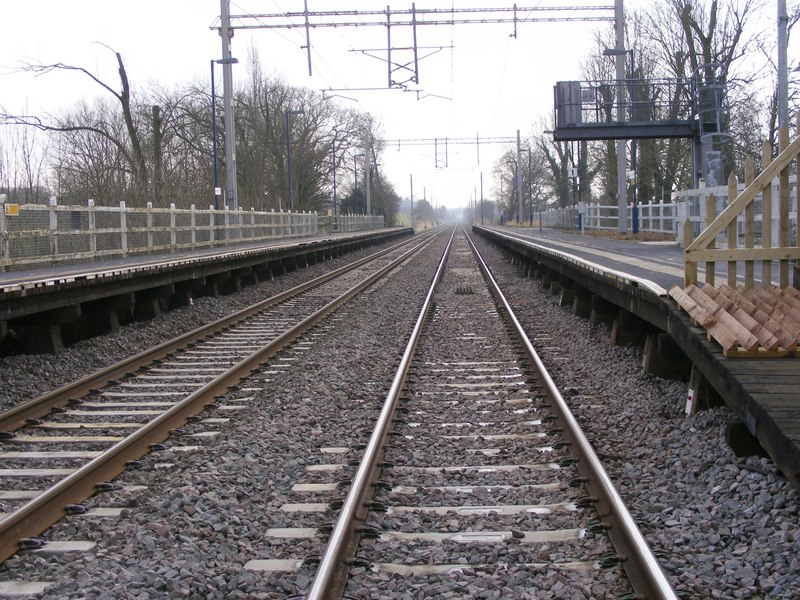
Wedgwood in February 2010

- Barlaston and Wedgwood, service suspended since May 2004

In May 2003 Central Trains services on the Stafford to Stoke-on-Trent line were withdrawn while the line was closed as part of an upgrade of the West Coast Main Line with a bus service introduced serving Norton Bridge, Stone and Barlaston and Wedgwood. The rail service resumed in January 2004, but was withdrawn in May 2004 as Central Trains were short of crews while it trained them to operate Class 321s and 350s, and a replacement bus service was reintroduced. The rail services were scheduled to resume in May 2005, however the Strategic Rail Authority decided the rail services would not be reinstated as with an increase in services by other operators, the paths were no longer available.

In December 2008 London Midland introduced a new service between London Euston and Crewe that operated via the Stafford to Stoke-on-Trent line, however only Stone was reopened with the other stations continuing to be served by buses. A consultation ran from October 2016 until February 2017 to officially close Norton Bridge and end the rail replacement bus service. Norton Bridge officially closed on 10 December 2017 when the London Midland franchise ended and the replacement bus, part funded by the Department for Transport ended in March 2019. However, proposals were made to reopen Wedgwood and/or Barlaston.

== Greater Manchester ==
- Manchester United Football Ground, service suspended since 2018

The station was served by Arriva Rail North on match days only, until the service was suspended at the request of Manchester United, due to health and safety concerns.

== Inverclyde ==
- IBM, service suspended since 9 December 2018

Following the closure and subsequent demolition of the former IBM site in 2016, Abellio ScotRail's Inverclyde line services from Glasgow Central to Wemyss Bay continued to serve IBM station with an hourly service. On 9 December 2018 all services ceased to call at the station as part of a revised timetable. The decision was taken following a rise in crime and anti-social behaviour in the disused site surrounding the station and due to a decrease in passenger numbers as a result of the site's closure. The station has not been formally closed as Abellio ScotRail have stated that services could resume if the site is redeveloped.

== Devon ==
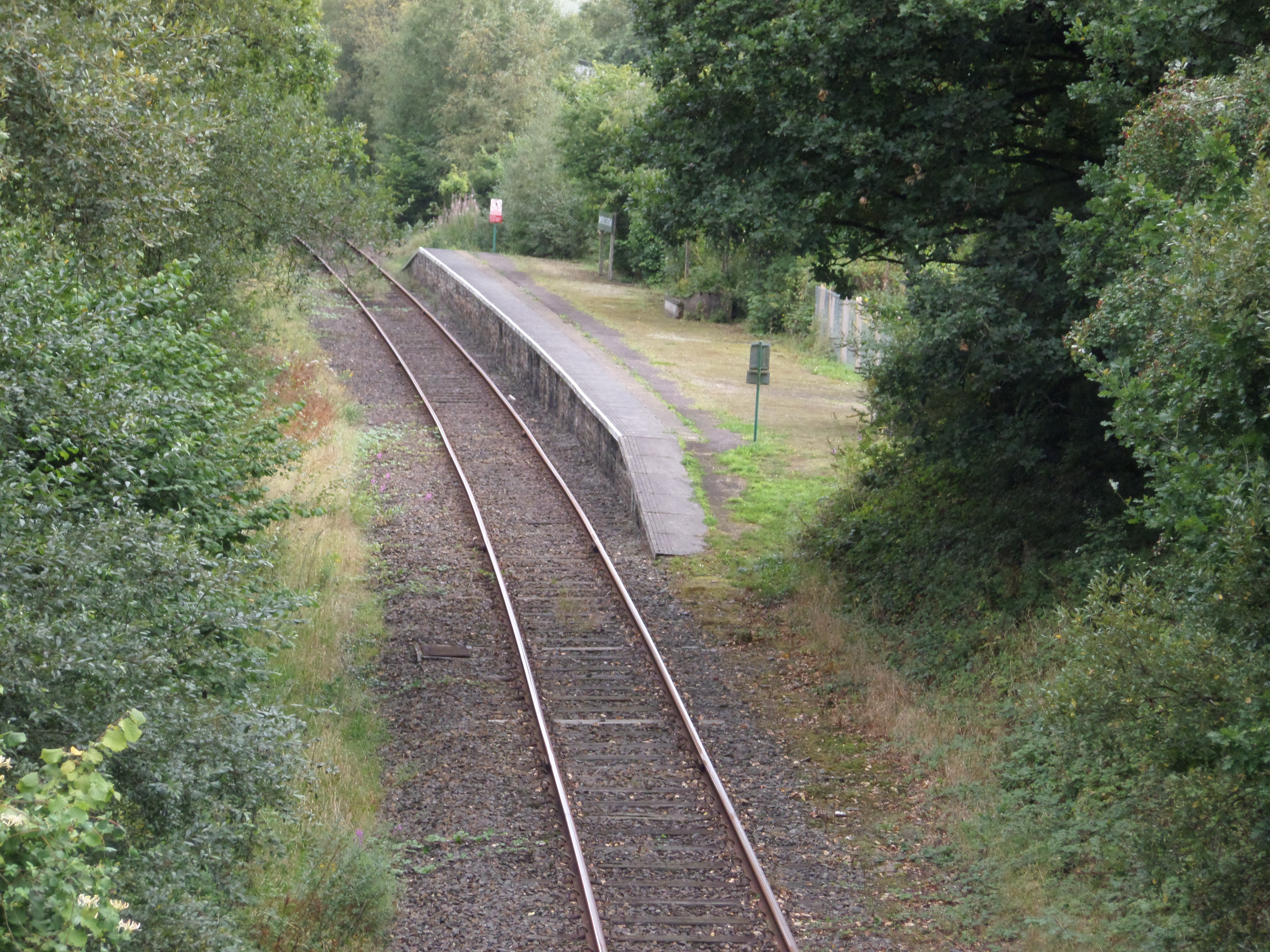
Sampford Courtenay, photographed in 2016

- Sampford Courtenay, service suspended since September 2019

Services on the line ceased in September 2019, and in 2020 it was announced that Dartmoor Railway, who operated the line, had gone into administration. Network Rail announced in March 2021 that it had taken over the Dartmoor Line and regular passenger services would be introduced by the end of 2021, however Sampford Courtenay is not included in these plans and will not have services re-instated.

== North Yorkshire ==
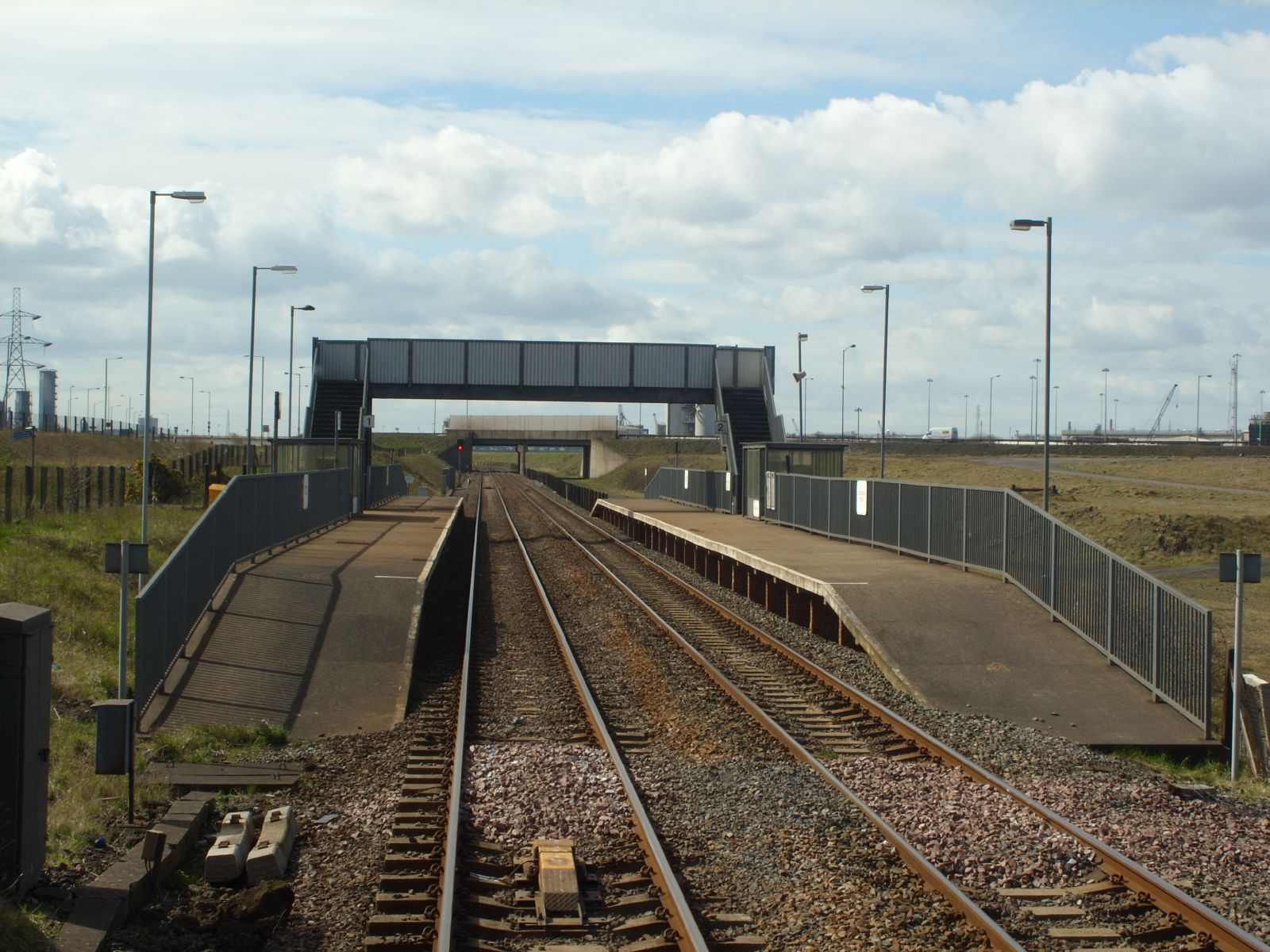
Redcar British Steel, photographed in April 2008.

- Redcar British Steel, service suspended since 14 December 2019

Following the closure of the Teesside Steelworks in 2015, Northern Rail services on the Tees Valley Line continued to serve the station, with two services operating in each direction on weekdays and Saturday. These services were withdrawn on 14 December 2019. In 2017–18, it was the least-used station in Britain, serving just 40 passengers.

== Cheshire ==
- Stanlow and Thornton, service suspended since February 2022

Stanlow and Thornton was opened in 1940 to serve Thornton AEL. The station opened to the public a year later and is on the Hooton–Helsby line. Services were frequent and terminated at Hooton but were withdrawn when the Wirral line was electrified to Ellesmere Port. Services were 6 trains per day Monday-Saturday before the May 2019 timetable change, two in the morning towards Ellesmere Port, two towards Helsby with one extending to Warrington Bank Quay and one in the evening to Ellesmere Port and one to Manchester Victoria. As of 2022 there are two services in each direction on weekdays, two to Ellesmere Port, one in the morning to Helsby and one in the evening to Liverpool Lime Street. On Saturdays, there are two trains in each direction in the morning and one in each direction in the evening, to Ellesmere and Helsby respectively, except the 06:05 service originating from Liverpool. The station was closed on 3 February 2022 following safety concerns regarding to the footbridge, which is the only way of entry to the station. The station recorded 0 passengers in the passenger statistics record in 2020/21, making it the least used station in the whole of the country, joint with Sampford Courtenay.

== County Durham ==
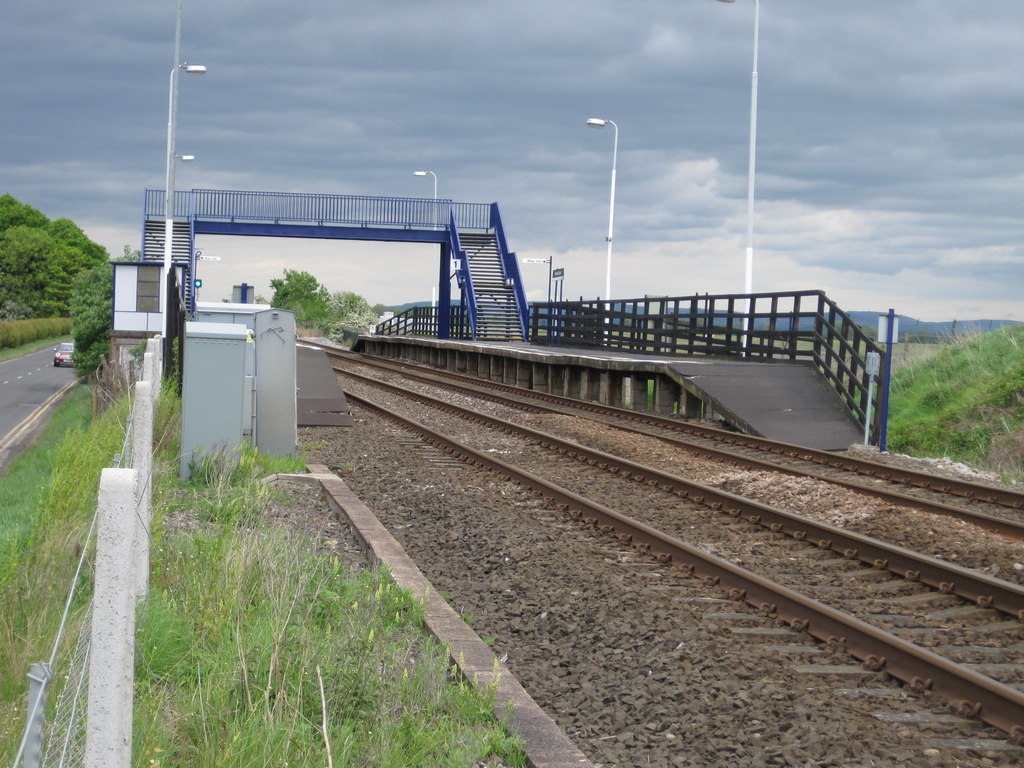
Teesside Airport station.

- Teesside Airport, service suspended since May 2022

The station was opened in 1971 by British Rail to serve Teesside International Airport. However, its distance from the airport itself means usage of the station has always been low: it is one of Britain's least used railway stations. The service at the station, for many years consisting of one train per week westbound to Darlington, was suspended in May 2022.

== See also ==
- Parliamentary train – mainly routes that have smaller stations on the line or to keep the line from closure by making very few timetabled trains on the route.
- List of least used railway stations of Great Britain
- Closure by stealth
