= Rail transport in Staffordshire =

Railway lines in Staffordshire, past and present

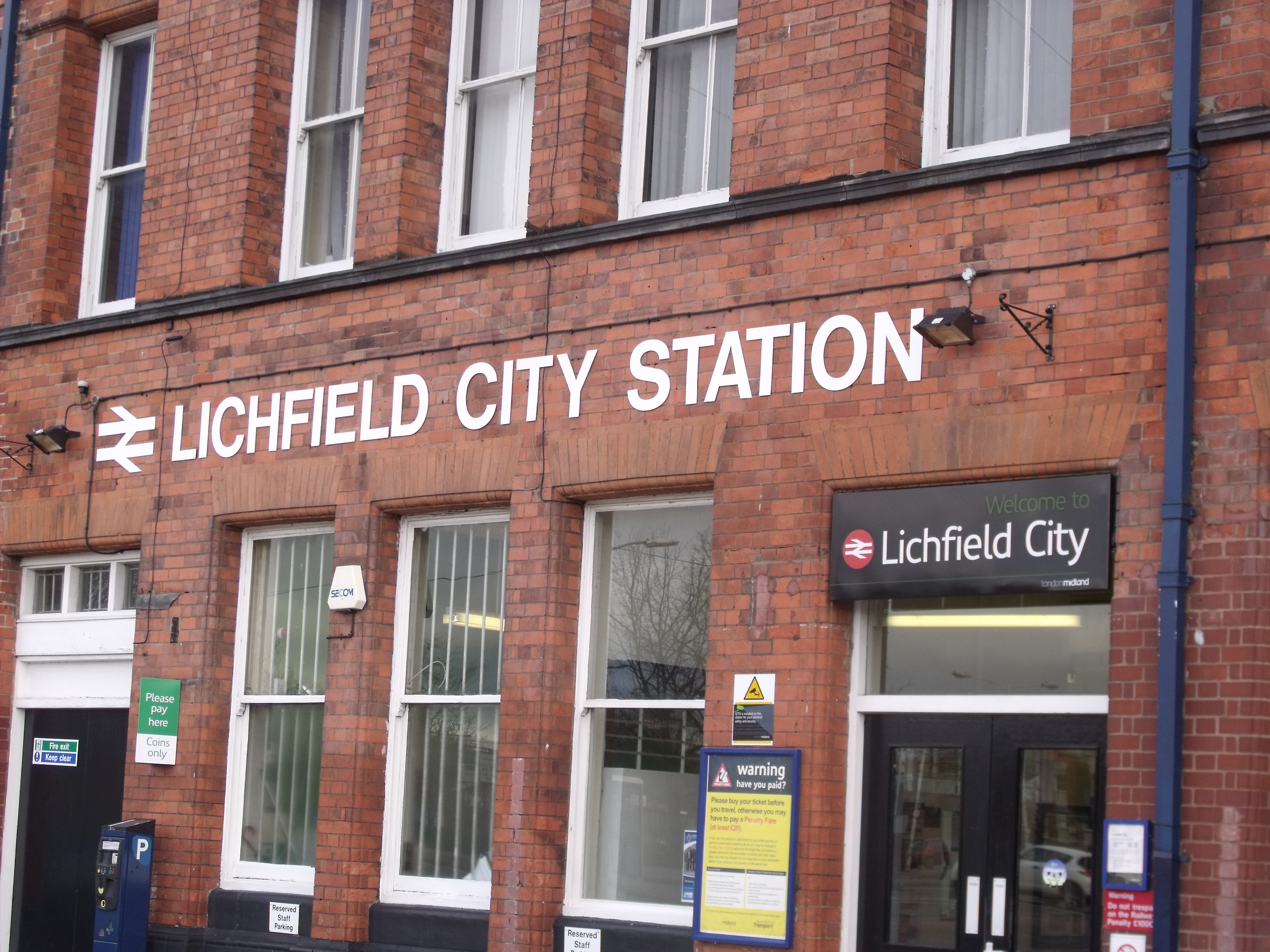
Lichfield City station on the Cross-City Line.

Rail transport in Staffordshire has a long history. Stafford itself is a major "crossroads" on the West Coast Main Line, handling passenger and freight services between London and Scotland along with traffic travelling between Manchester and Birmingham. Stoke-on-Trent was once a major railway centre, especially for traffic associated with the coal mining and pottery industries, but in recent years this traffic has almost completely disappeared.

== History ==
- Grand Junction Railway (1833–1846)
- London and North Western Railway (1846–1922)
- North Staffordshire Railway (1845–1922) 220.75 miles (355 km)
- Leek and Manifold Valley Light Railway (narrow gauge) (1904–1922) 8.25 miles (13 km)
- London, Midland and Scottish Railway (1923–1948)
- British Rail (1947–1997)
  - London Midland Region (British Railways) (1948–?)
  - Western Region of British Railways (1948–1963)
  - Regional Railways (1981–1996)
  - InterCity (British Rail) (1981–1997)
- Central Trains (1997–2007)
- First North Western (1997–2004)
- Virgin CrossCountry (1997–2007)
- Virgin Trains West Coast (1997-2019)
- Northern Rail (2004–2016)
- CrossCountry (2007 to date)
- East Midlands Trains (2007–2019)
- London Midland (2007–2017)
- Arriva Rail North (2016-2020)
- West Midlands Trains (2017 to date)
- East Midlands Railway (2019 to date)
- Avanti West Coast (2019 to date)
- Northern Trains (2020 to date)

== The decline of the railways ==
Staffordshire's railways were considerably reduced by the Beeching cuts in the 1960s. The famous Loop Line along with several other routes were closed, while several stations, such as Uttoxeter, only narrowly missed closure. A considerable number of coal mines retained their railway connections, but with the decline of the industry, very few survive.

Barlaston, Norton Bridge and Wedgwood last saw rail services in 2003. Etruria, no longer used by local workers, closed in 2005.

== Stone station reopening ==
Stone railway station was reopened in 2008.

== Current lines ==
- Cross-City Line
- West Coast Main Line
- Cross Country Route (Derby to Birmingham)
- Chase Line
- Crewe to Derby Line

== Closed lines ==
- Cheadle Branch Line
- Potteries Loop Line
- South Staffordshire Line
- Stafford and Uttoxeter Railway
- Stoke-Market Drayton Line

== Heritage railways ==
- Chasewater Railway
- Churnet Valley Railway
- Foxfield Railway
- Rudyard Lake Steam Railway
