= Parliamentary train =

Railway service run solely to meet a legal requirement

A parliamentary train is a term used in the United Kingdom for a railway service run solely to meet a legal requirement.

Originally, the term referred to services operated to comply with the Railway Regulation Act 1844 that required train companies to provide inexpensive and basic rail transport for less affluent passengers. The act required that at least one such service per day be run on every railway route in the UK.

Such trains are no longer a legal requirement (although most franchise agreements require some less expensive trains). The term's meaning has changed to describe train services that continue to be run with reduced frequency, often to the minimum required one train per week, and without specially low prices, to avoid the cost of formal closure of a route or station, retain access rights, or maintain crew training/familiarity requirements on short sections of track. Such services are sometimes called "ghost trains". Sometimes even the train itself is omitted, with a cheaper-to-operate rail replacement bus service running instead.

== Nineteenth-century usage ==
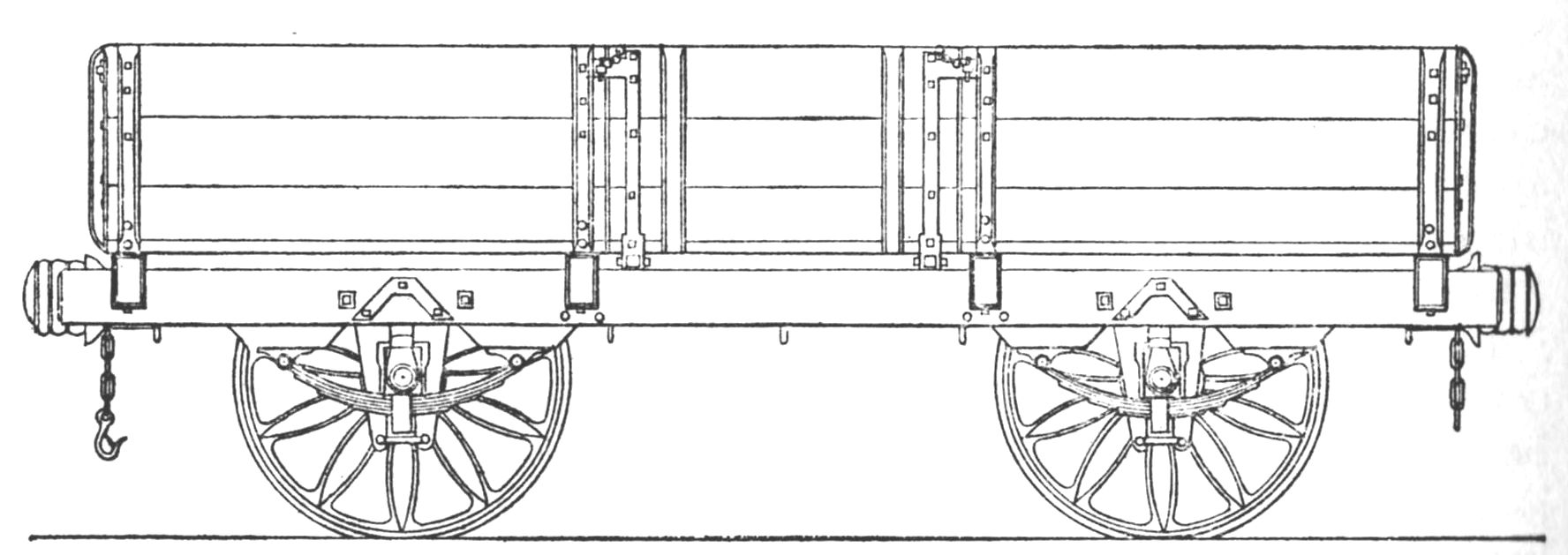
Great Western Railway open passenger car

In the earliest days of passenger railways in the United Kingdom the poor were encouraged to travel in order to find employment in the growing industrial centres, but trains were generally unaffordable to them except in the most basic of open wagons, in many cases attached to goods trains. Political pressure caused the Board of Trade to investigate, and Sir Robert Peel's Conservative government enacted the Railway Regulation Act 1844, which took effect on 1 November 1844. It compelled "the provision of at least one train a day each way at a speed of not less than 12 miles an hour including stops, which were to be made at all stations, and of carriages protected from the weather and provided with seats; for all which luxuries not more than a penny a mile might be charged".

Railway companies reluctantly complied with the law. They scheduled parliamentary trains at inconvenient times and used uncomfortable carriages. One account stated that when passengers complained about a delay, they were told "ye are only the nigger train". James Allport of Midland Railway was proud of providing comfortable third-class service passenger service, but stated that his company needed 25 years to do so.

=== In popular culture ===
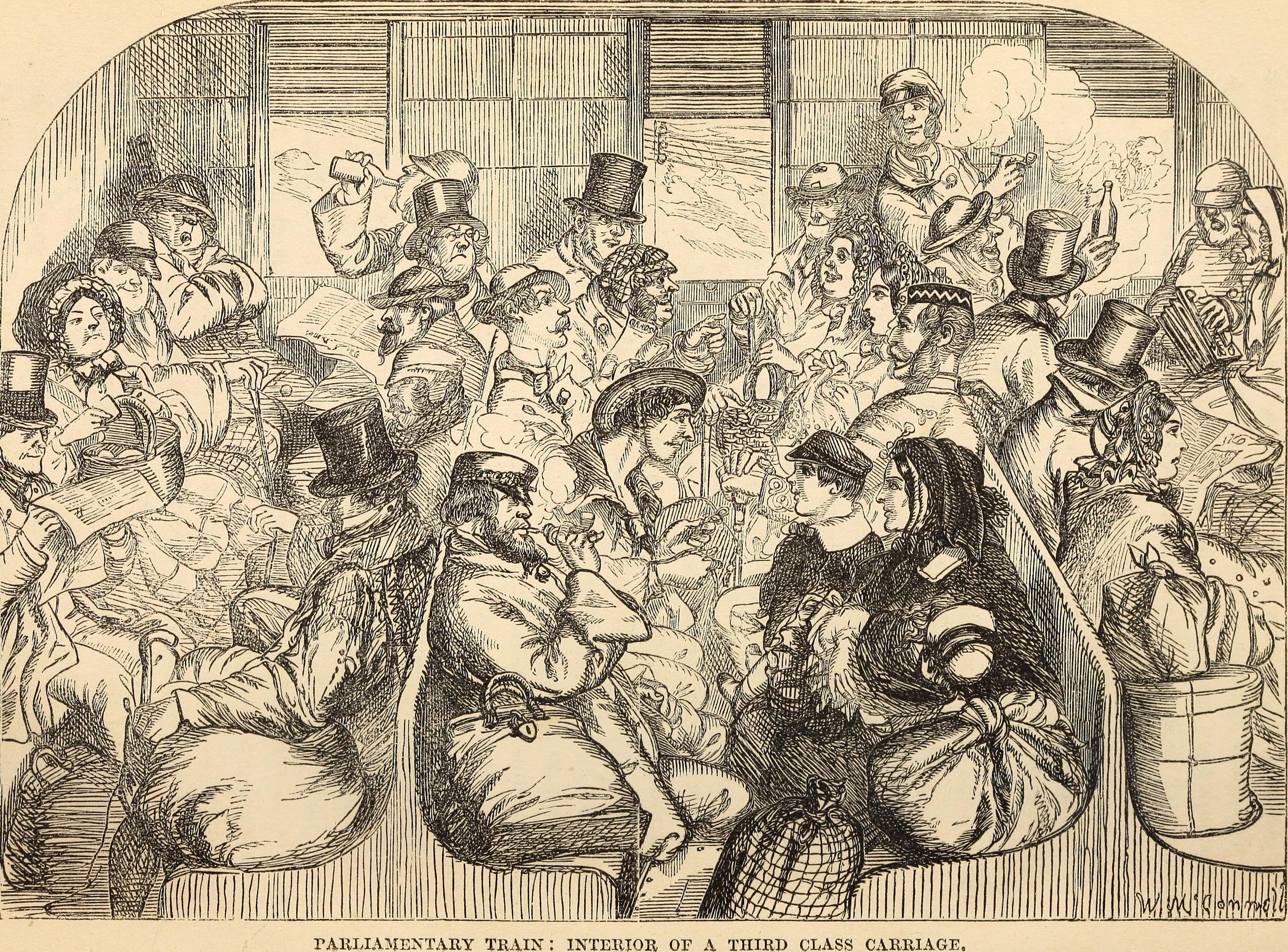
Parliamentary Train: Interior of a third class carriage (1859)

The basic comfort and slow progress of Victorian parliamentary trains led to a humorous reference in Gilbert and Sullivan's comic opera The Mikado. The Mikado is explaining how he will match punishments to the crimes committed:

The idiot who, in railway carriages,
Scribbles on window-panes
We only suffer
To ride on a buffer
In Parliamentary trains.

== Legacy of the Beeching cuts ==
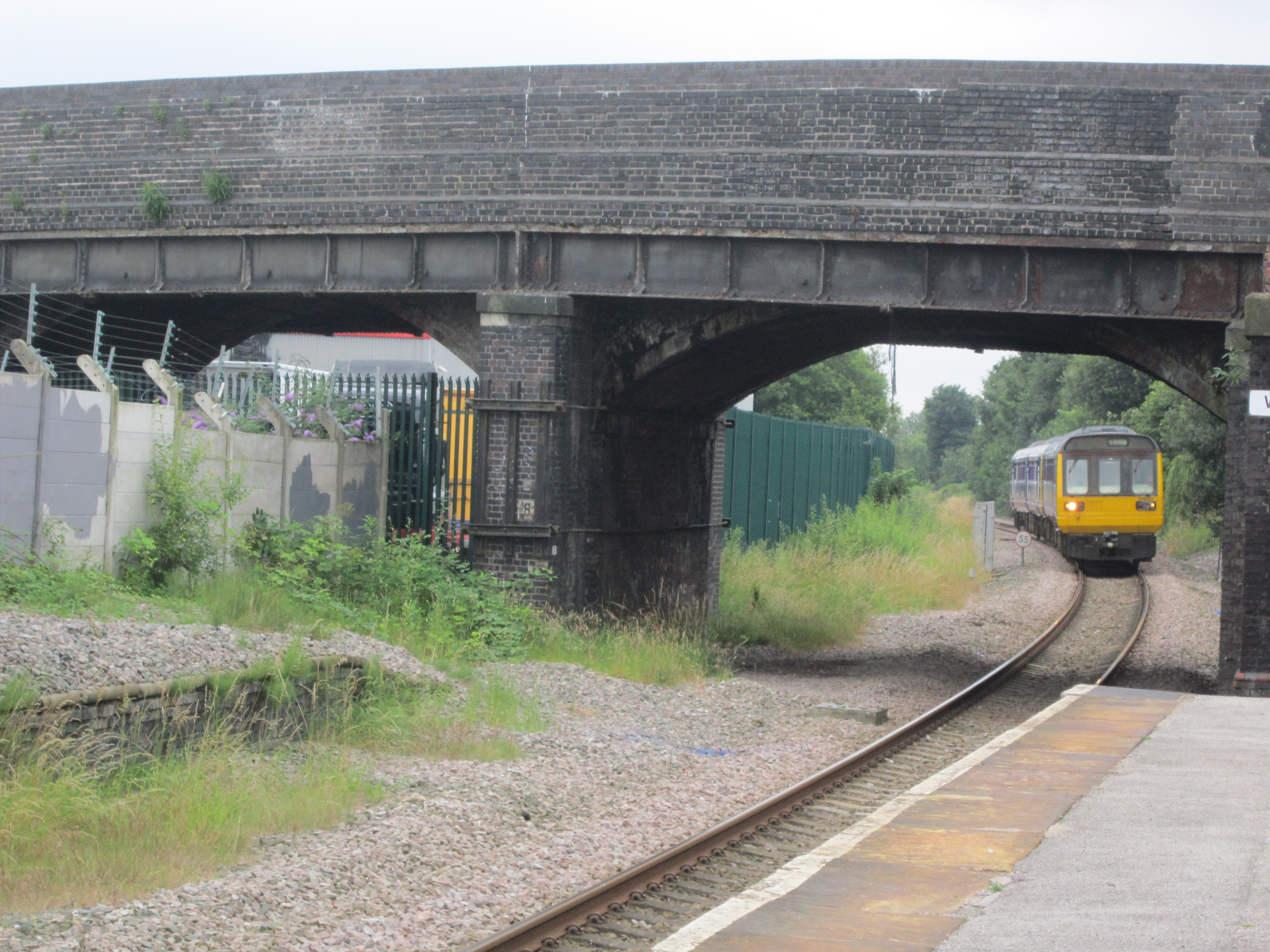
The Stockport to Stalybridge shuttle approaches Reddish South. This is one of the most well-known parliamentary services throughout the country.

In 1963 under its chairman Richard Beeching, British Railways produced The Reshaping of British Railways report, designed to stem the huge losses being incurred as patronage declined. It proposed very substantial cuts to the network and to train services, with many lines closed under a programme that came to be known as the Beeching cuts. The Transport Act 1962 included a formal closure process allowing for objections to closures on the basis of hardship to passengers if their service was closed. As the objections gained momentum, this process became increasingly difficult to implement, and from about 1970 closures slowed to a trickle.

In certain cases, where there was exceptionally low usage, the train service was reduced to a bare minimum but the service was not formally closed, avoiding the costs associated with closure. In some cases, the service was reduced to one train a week and in one direction only.

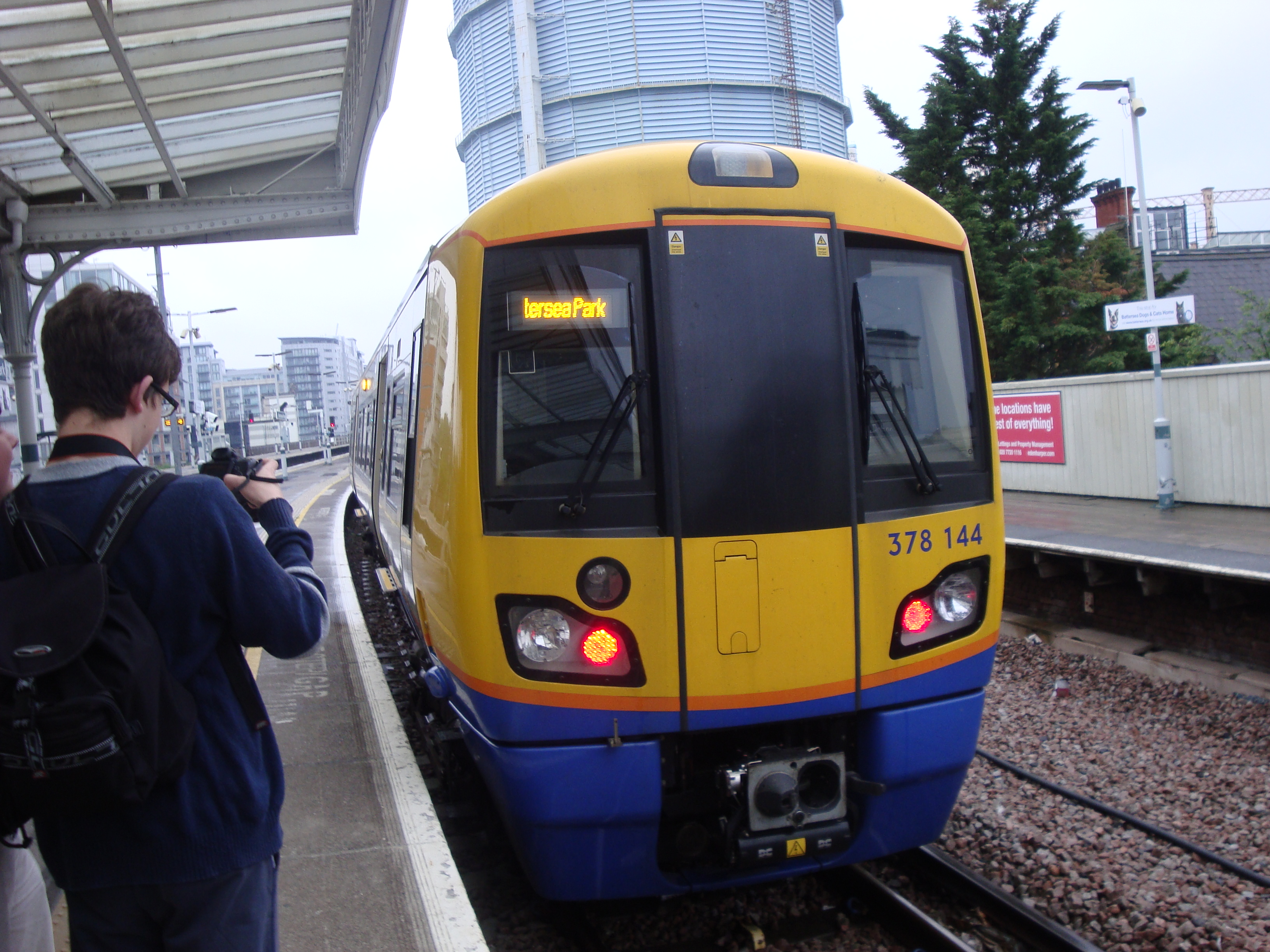
London Overground Class 378 at Battersea Park operating a parliamentary service. It is also used when the line to Clapham Junction is blocked.

These minimal services had resonances of the 19th-century parliamentary services and, among rail enthusiasts, they came to be referred to as "parliamentary trains", "ghost trains", or, more colloquially, "parly" trains (following the abbreviation used in Victorian timetables). However, this terminology has no official standing. So-called parliamentary services are also typically run at inconvenient times, often very early in the morning, very late at night or in the middle of the day at the weekend. In extreme instances, rail services have actually been "temporarily" withdrawn and replaced by substitute bus services, to maintain the pretence that the service has not been withdrawn.

=== Speller Act ===
Transport Act 1962 (Amendment) Act 1981 (Note: Section 2(1).)
- Act of Parliament
- Parliament of the United Kingdom
- Long title: An Act to make provision with respect to experimental railway passenger services.
- Citation: 1981 c. 32
- Territorial extent: United Kingdom

Dates
- Royal assent: 2 July 1981
- Commencement: 1 August 1981 (Note: Section 2(2).)
Other legislation
Amends	Transport Act 1962
Relates to	Railways Act 1993

Status: Current legislation

Text of statute as originally enacted

Revised text of statute as amended

Text of the Transport Act 1962 (Amendment) Act 1981 as in force today (including any amendments) within the United Kingdom, from legislation.gov.uk.

When the closures brought about by the Beeching Report had reached equilibrium, it was recognised that some incremental services or station reopenings were desirable. However, if a service was started and proved unsuccessful, it could not be closed again without going through the formal process, with the possibility that it might not be terminated. It was recognised that this discouraged possible desirable developments and the Transport Act 1962 (Amendment) Act 1981 permitted the immediate closure of such experimental reopenings. The bill that led to the act of 1981 was sponsored by a pro-railways Member of Parliament, Tony Speller, and it is usually referred to as the Speller Act. The process is still in effect, although the legislation has been subsumed into other enactments.

== Services ==
=== As of 2026 ===
Examples of lines in the current timetable served only by a parliamentary train are: (Note: Many of these trains were temporarily suspended as a result of the COVID-19 pandemic, although this information has been omitted from this table.)

Origin	Destination	Days operated	Outbound departure	Return departure	Operator	Comments
Battersea Park	Dalston Junction	Monday – Friday	06:33; 23:03	22:04	London Overground	Commenced 9 December 2012 after Southern service between London Victoria and London Bridge via the South London line ceased. Common diversionary route when the line to Clapham Junction is closed.
Battersea Park	Dalston Junction	Saturday	07:30; 07:45; 08:00; 08:15; 08:33	06:34; 06:49; 07:04; 07:19; 07:34	London Overground	Commenced 9 December 2012 after Southern service between London Victoria and London Bridge via the South London line ceased. Common diversionary route when the line to Clapham Junction is closed.
Battersea Park	Highbury & Islington	Sunday	07:47	N/A	London Overground	Commenced 9 December 2012 after Southern service between London Victoria and London Bridge via the South London line ceased. Common diversionary route when the line to Clapham Junction is closed.
Liverpool Street	Enfield Town	Saturday	05:30	N/A	London Overground	Runs via South Tottenham but does not call. Unreliable and is often diverted via Stoke Newington.
Stalybridge	Stockport	Saturday	08:30	09:04	Northern Trains	Via Stockport to Stalybridge Line. Only service that calls at Reddish South & Denton
Sheffield	Cleethorpes	Monday - Friday	09:54	13:20	Northern Trains	Via Kirton Lindsey & Brigg. Became a parliamentary service when weekday services were withdrawn in 1993. Regular trains have operated between Gainsborough and Sheffield for most timetable periods since. Suspended January 2022 by Northern, who cited COVID-19 and staffing issues (although they did not provide any replacement buses), but the service was reinstated in December 2022. Changed in May 2023 to be one return journey on weekdays only.
Liverpool Lime Street	Ellesmere Port	Monday – Saturday		19:06	Northern Trains	Merseyrail trains operate west of Ellesmere Port, but there are proposals for their new stock to take over the current limited service to Helsby. The line also sees limited freight use. Stanlow & Thornton station, which would be the first stop east of Ellesmere Port, had its service suspended in 2022. These are the only services that call at Ince & Elton.
Helsby	Ellesmere Port	Monday – Saturday	06:03; 18:50	06:33	Northern Trains	Merseyrail trains operate west of Ellesmere Port, but there are proposals for their new stock to take over the current limited service to Helsby. The line also sees limited freight use. Stanlow & Thornton station, which would be the first stop east of Ellesmere Port, had its service suspended in 2022. These are the only services that call at Ince & Elton.
Lancaster	Morecambe (via Carnforth)	Monday – Saturday	05:19 (Lancaster); 05:30 (Carnforth)	N/A	Northern Trains	Via the Hest Bank curve.
Goole	Leeds	Monday – Saturday	07:42; 19:43	17:58	Northern Trains	Via the Pontefract line. Providing the only services to; Rawcliffe, Snaith, Hensall & Whitley Bridge
Swansea	Fishguard Harbour	Monday – Saturday	10:58	N/A	Transport for Wales	These trains use the line between Carmarthen Jn and Carmarthen Bridge Jn, so avoid Carmarthen station.
Swansea	Fishguard Harbour	Monday – Friday	08:17	N/A	Transport for Wales	These trains use the line between Carmarthen Jn and Carmarthen Bridge Jn, so avoid Carmarthen station.
Fishguard Harbour	Cardiff Central	Saturday	12:41	N/A	Transport for Wales	These trains use the Swansea avoiding curve, which runs around the rear of Landore depot. Other trains which avoid Swansea may use the Swansea District Line, which heads north from Neath towards the Heart of Wales line.
Fishguard Harbour	Cardiff Central	Sunday	12:40	N/A	Transport for Wales	These trains use the Swansea avoiding curve, which runs around the rear of Landore depot. Other trains which avoid Swansea may use the Swansea District Line, which heads north from Neath towards the Heart of Wales line.
Cardiff Central	Milford Haven	Sunday	12:04	N/A	Transport for Wales	These trains use the Swansea avoiding curve, which runs around the rear of Landore depot. Other trains which avoid Swansea may use the Swansea District Line, which heads north from Neath towards the Heart of Wales line.
Glenrothes with Thornton	Edinburgh Waverley	Sunday	22:58	N/A	ScotRail	These trains use the direct line between Dalmeny and Linlithgow, reversing at the latter. The line was last used before the COVID-19 pandemic.
Dundee	Edinburgh Waverley	Monday – Thursday	22:31	N/A	ScotRail	These trains use the direct line between Dalmeny and Linlithgow, reversing at the latter. The line was last used before the COVID-19 pandemic.
Cannon Street	Tunbridge Wells	Tuesday – Saturday	00:20 (Tuesday / Wednesday)	N/A	Southeastern	These journeys use the curve between Beckenham Junction and New Beckenham (previously used by a weekday morning Cannon Street to Beckenham Junction via New Beckenham train, returning in the afternoon to Charing Cross). This is a common diversionary route for trains from Charing Cross to Hastings when the route through Hither Green is closed.
Charing Cross	Tunbridge Wells	Tuesday – Saturday	00:15 (Thursday – Saturday)	04:45 (Monday – Friday) (Note: From Tonbridge.)	Southeastern	These journeys use the curve between Beckenham Junction and New Beckenham (previously used by a weekday morning Cannon Street to Beckenham Junction via New Beckenham train, returning in the afternoon to Charing Cross). This is a common diversionary route for trains from Charing Cross to Hastings when the route through Hither Green is closed.
London Victoria	Ramsgate	Monday – Friday	06:05	N/A	Southeastern	Via Stewarts Lane Jn. Also used on occasion by VSOE trains to Folkestone West. In previous years, an 05:50 train from London Victoria to Ashford International used the same route, but also called at Wandsworth Road and Clapham High Street. The outward service to Ramsgate is the first regular use of the eastbound line since the COVID-19 pandemic.
Gillingham	London Victoria	Monday – Friday	05:00	N/A	Southeastern	Via Stewarts Lane Jn. Also used on occasion by VSOE trains to Folkestone West. In previous years, an 05:50 train from London Victoria to Ashford International used the same route, but also called at Wandsworth Road and Clapham High Street. The outward service to Ramsgate is the first regular use of the eastbound line since the COVID-19 pandemic.
Glasgow Central	Edinburgh	Monday – Friday	21:05	N/A	CrossCountry	The only train to regularly use the Edinburgh Suburban line, which runs to the south of the main lines through Edinburgh. The line in the other direction has not seen regular use for some time. From March 2023, this train will run non-stop via Shotts, rather than calling at Motherwell.
Filton Abbey Wood	Bath Spa	Monday – Friday	15:59	N/A	Great Western Railway	Via Bristol East Curve. Only public service to regularly use the curve. The curve in the other direction towards Filton has not seen regular use in a considerable number of years.
Liskeard	Looe	Monday – Saturday	08:22; 14:04	09:22; 14:56	Great Western Railway	The only services that call at Coombe Junction Halt. Services not calling there reverse outside the station and dont pull up to the station platform
Worksop	Nottingham	Monday – Friday	23:43	N/A	East Midlands Railway	Via Ironville Jn. Since its inception it has suffered erratic performance, with its previous journey from Nottingham frequently terminating short at Mansfield Woodhouse, meaning this service starts from there.
Peterborough	Lincoln	Monday – Friday	23:11	N/A	East Midlands Railway	Runs via the Sleaford Avoiding line. The avoiding line heading south is not in regular use, but does see use as a diversion when the East Coast Main Line is closed near Newark North Gate.
Doncaster	Sleaford	Saturday	20:46	N/A	East Midlands Railway	Only train booked to use the "Up (East) Slow Line" between Bessacarr Jn and Doncaster Black Carr Jn. Previous service from Peterborough often terminates in platform 5 at Doncaster, causing this service to not run from platform 2 as it should.
Norwich	Manchester Piccadilly	Sunday	15:53	N/A	East Midlands Railway	Only passenger service to use the Ely West Curve to avoid calling at Ely.
London Kings Cross	Hull	Sunday	10:49; 17:18	N/A	Hull Trains	These trains use the line between Loversall Carr Jn and Doncaster Flyover East Jn, to the south of Doncaster.
London Kings Cross	Leeds	Monday – Friday	08:03	N/A	London North Eastern Railway	These trains use the line between Loversall Carr Jn and Doncaster Flyover East Jn, to the south of Doncaster.
London Kings Cross	Harrogate	Monday – Friday	15:53	N/A	London North Eastern Railway	These trains use the line between Loversall Carr Jn and Doncaster Flyover East Jn, to the south of Doncaster.
London Kings Cross	Newcastle	Monday – Friday	22:00	N/A	London North Eastern Railway	These trains use the line between Loversall Carr Jn and Doncaster Flyover East Jn, to the south of Doncaster.
London Kings Cross	Sunderland	Monday – Friday	20:00	N/A	London North Eastern Railway	Only services to use the single-line curve at the southern end of King Edward VII Bridge. Northern service started in late 2019, LNER service started running in December 2021.
Carlisle	Nunthorpe	Sunday	14:49	N/A	Northern Trains	Only services to use the single-line curve at the southern end of King Edward VII Bridge. Northern service started in late 2019, LNER service started running in December 2021.
Skipton	London Kings Cross	Saturday	06:56	N/A	London North Eastern Railway	This train uses the curve between Hambleton West Jn and Hambleton South Jn.
York	London Kings Cross	Monday – Friday	04:40	N/A	London North Eastern Railway	These trains use the spur between Doncaster Flyover East Jn and Loversall Carr Jn, to the south of Doncaster.
Harrogate	London Kings Cross	Monday – Friday	07:37	N/A	London North Eastern Railway	These trains use the spur between Doncaster Flyover East Jn and Loversall Carr Jn, to the south of Doncaster.
Leeds	London Kings Cross	Monday – Friday	17:45	N/A	London North Eastern Railway	These trains use the spur between Doncaster Flyover East Jn and Loversall Carr Jn, to the south of Doncaster.
Leeds	London Kings Cross	Sunday	10:45	N/A	London North Eastern Railway	These trains use the spur between Doncaster Flyover East Jn and Loversall Carr Jn, to the south of Doncaster.
Leeds	Plymouth	Sunday	08:11	N/A	CrossCountry	This train uses the line between Lichfield Trent Valley (High Level) and Wichnor Jn. Only West Midlands Trains operate services along this line, as far as Lichfield.
Plymouth	Leeds	Sunday	18:27	N/A	CrossCountry	These trains use the curve between Calder Bridge Jn and Turners Lane Jn, which avoids Wakefield Kirkgate.
Sheffield	Leeds	Friday	23:15	N/A	Northern Trains	These trains use the curve between Calder Bridge Jn and Turners Lane Jn, which avoids Wakefield Kirkgate.
Chesham	Watford	Monday – Saturday	05:12	N/A	London Underground, Metropolitan Line	These trains use the Watford curve, which runs directly from Rickmansworth to Croxley and Watford.
Rickmansworth	Watford	Monday – Friday	06:08	00:19 (Monday – Friday); 00:49 (Tuesday – Saturday)	London Underground, Metropolitan Line	These trains use the Watford curve, which runs directly from Rickmansworth to Croxley and Watford.
Streatham Hill	London Bridge	Monday –Friday	17:20	N/A	Southern	Formerly an evening peak service ceased in March 2020, reintroduced in May 2023 as a morning peak service and changed back to an evening peak service in December 2024. Only service for a number of years to use the Leigham Spur between Streatham Hill and Tulse Hill. The line in the other direction has not seen regular use for a number of years.
West Ealing	West Ruislip	Wednesday	11:17	One way	Chiltern Railways	Operated since late 2022 by a bus replacement service.
Melton Mowbray	London St Pancras	Mon - Fri	08:15	18:35	East Midlands Railway	The only passenger service between Oakham and Corby, as a portion attached to a London - Nottingham service at Kettering
Derby	London St Pancras	Tue - Fri (outward) / Mon - Fri (return)	04:13	23:35 (terminating at Nottingham)	East Midlands Railway	Run via Melton Mowbray, Oakham and Corby but do not call. Common diversionary route when the direct line between Kettering and Leicester is closed.
Basingstoke	London Waterloo	Mon - Sat	04:54	One-way	South Western Railway	The only mainline passenger service via Wimbledon Park and the curve to Waterloo–Reading line but do not call at any intermediate stations between Wimbledon and Clapham Junction. Common route for empty coaching stock movement from Wimbledon Traincare Depot to London Waterloo.

=== Former ===
Examples of lines formerly served only by a parliamentary train are:

Origin	Destination	Days operated	Outbound departure	Return departure	Operator	Ceased	Comments
Watford Junction	Croxley Green	Monday – Friday	06:46	06:59	Network SouthEast	22 March 1996	Ceased when the branch line was temporarily closed for construction of the Ascot Road bridge near Croxley Green. The service was never reinstated as it was considered uneconomical to bridge the road, and was permanently closed on 29 September 2003.
Hereford	Birmingham New Street	Saturday	10:35	11:30	Regional Railways	Late 1996	Called at Smethwick West following an administrative error that required it to be open a year further following the opening of Smethwick Galton Bridge.
Kensington Olympia	Wandsworth Road	Monday – Friday	10:02	N/A	Southern	17 June 2013	Ceased when London Overground began operations to Clapham Junction. The main route between Latchmere No. 1 Jn and Longhedge Jn never regained regular passenger use.
Chester	Runcorn	Summer Saturday	07:53	N/A	Arriva Rail North	8 September 2018	Via the one-way Halton Curve, northbound only. Last ran 2018, full-time services resumed in May 2019, operated by Transport for Wales.
Woodgrange Park	Willesden Junction	Monday –Friday	07:59	N/A	London Overground	Some time in 2018	This service travelled via the curve between the Gospel Oak to Barking line and North London Line which bypasses the platform at Gospel Oak. Last regularly operated mid to late 2018 but still occasionally operates when the line is affected by engineering works.
South Ruislip or Gerrards Cross	London Paddington or West Ealing	Monday –Friday	10:57 / 11:02 from South Ruislip 10:01 / 10:44 from Gerrards Cross	11:11 / 11:35 / 11:36 to High Wycombe / Princes Risborough / West Ruislip from Paddington 11:47 to High Wycombe from West Ealing	Chiltern Railways	7 December 2018	Maintained route knowledge for drivers enabling services to divert to Paddington when Marylebone was closed. Service diverted to West Ealing, via the Greenford Branch Line, from 7 December 2018 with the closure of the Acton-Northolt line services to enable High Speed 2 works.
Kyle of Lochalsh	Elgin	Saturday	17:13	N/A	Abellio ScotRail	May 2019	This train used the Rose Street Curve on its way to Elgin, going past Inverness and then stopping, before reversing for the second time to head to Elgin. In the 2018 timetable, the train ran on weekdays as well. This line has not seen regular use since.
Reading	Birmingham New Street	Monday –Friday	22:02	N/A	CrossCountry	March 2020	Used the Soho South Jn – Perry Bar South Jn. Occasionally used on football match days.
Reading	Shalford	Monday –Friday	07:17	N/A	Great Western Railway	May 2022	Via the Reading Spur line. Another line from the mainline platforms at Reading is only accessible from the higher numbered platforms, which is mostly used when trains are going towards the North Downs Line from Reading TMD. Regular service ended in May 2022, however the route is maintained for diversionary use.
West Ealing	West Ruislip	Wednesday	11:17	N/A	Chiltern Railways	December 2022	Via the Greenford line, commenced 10 December 2018 replacing previous service to London Paddington via the Acton–Northolt line. Became a weekly service after the COVID-19 pandemic. Last ran 7 December 2022, now replaced with a bus service replacement.
Birmingham New Street	Crewe	Saturday	07:13	N/A	West Midlands Railway	December 2022	Only service to go via the Bushbury line, which runs direct from Bescot Stadium to Penkridge. Other trains which run from Bescot to Penkridge run via Wolverhampton. Common diversionary route. Last service ran 10 December.
Wolverhampton	Rugeley Trent Valley	Saturday	05:42	N/A	West Midlands Railway	December 2022	Only service to go directly between Wolverhampton and Walsall, between Darlaston Jn and Pleck Jn. Other services use the line between Crane Street Jn (near Wolverhampton) and Portobello Jn. Last ran 10 December 2022.

== Stations with minimal services ==
A station may have a parliamentary service because the operating company wishes it closed, but the line is in regular use (most trains pass straight through). Examples include:

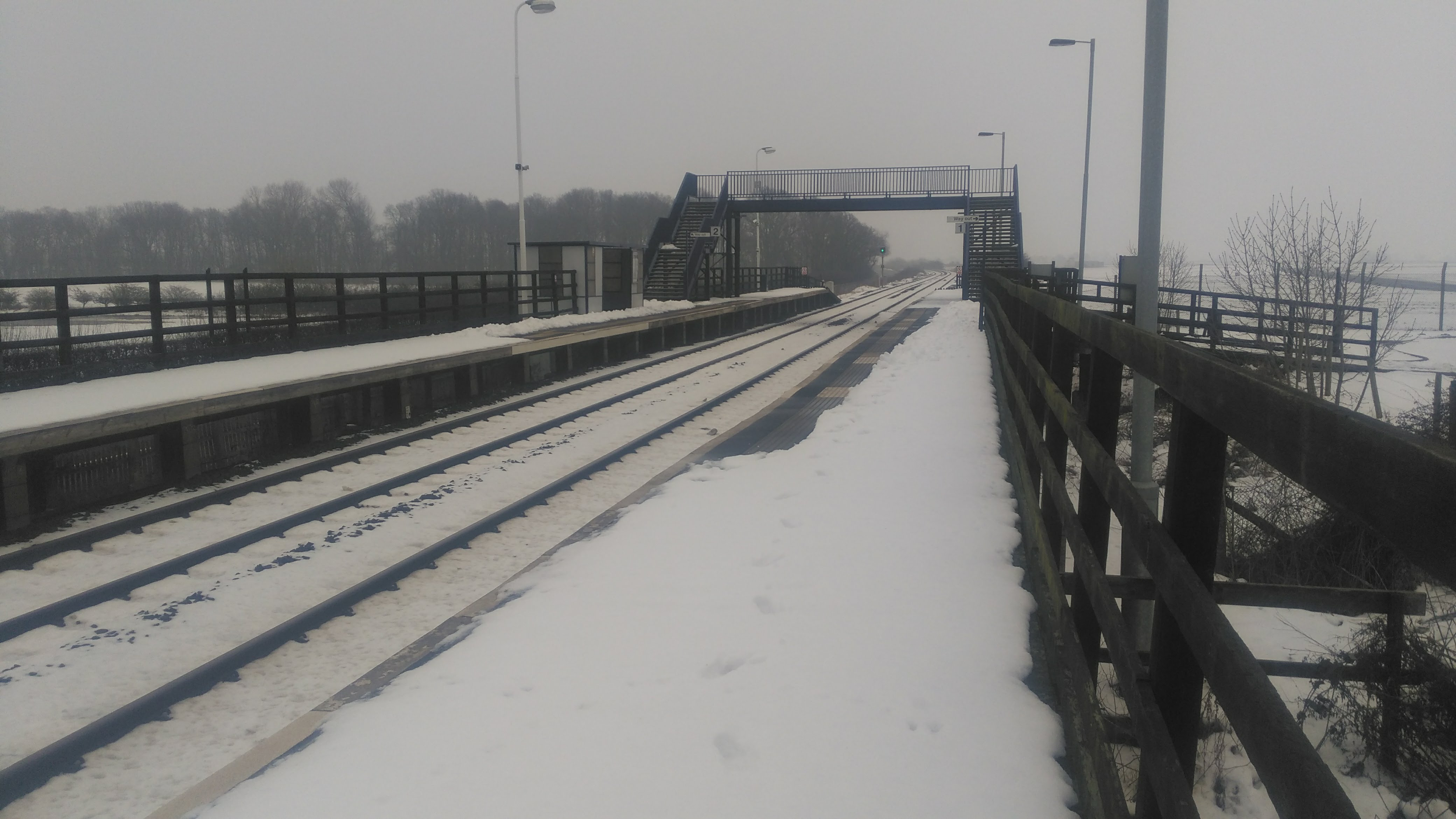
One service stops at Teesside Airport every week on a Sunday, at 14:54, even though it is a 15-minute walk to the airport.

- Barlaston and Wedgwood, which are currently only served by replacement buses.
- Teesside Airport, which serves Teesside International Airport, lost most of its services due to its relatively long distance to the terminal as well as competition from buses which offered more reliable services (which in turn were withdrawn due to the airport's sharp decrease in air passengers). Operated by Northern Trains. Service has been suspended since May 2022.
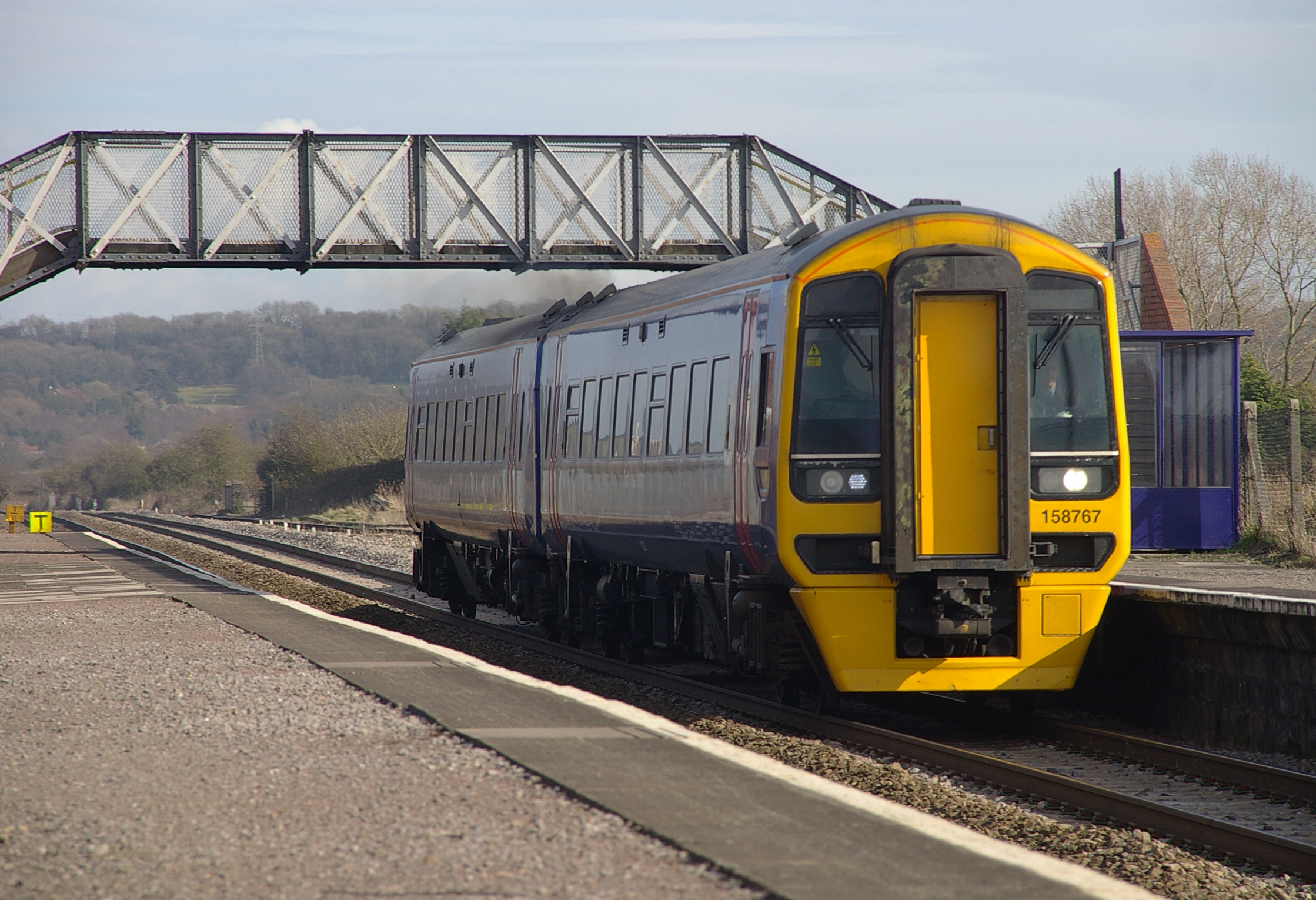
- Two Great Western Railway services stop at Pilning every week, both on a Saturday and in one direction only.
  Pilning, near Bristol – only two trains per week, both from Cardiff Central on Saturdays only at 08:33 (to Penzance) and 14:33 (to Taunton). Formerly one train each way per week, but the bridge to the down platform was removed in November 2016. Operated by Great Western Railway.
- Barry Links and Golf Street. From 19 May 2019, these stations are only served Monday-Saturday by the southbound 06:06 Arbroath to Dundee and 07:44 Arbroath to Edinburgh Waverley; northbound services are the 16:09 Glasgow Queen Street to Arbroath service (16:10 Saturday) and the 17:02 Edinburgh Waverley to Arbroath service (17:01 Saturday). Operated by ScotRail.
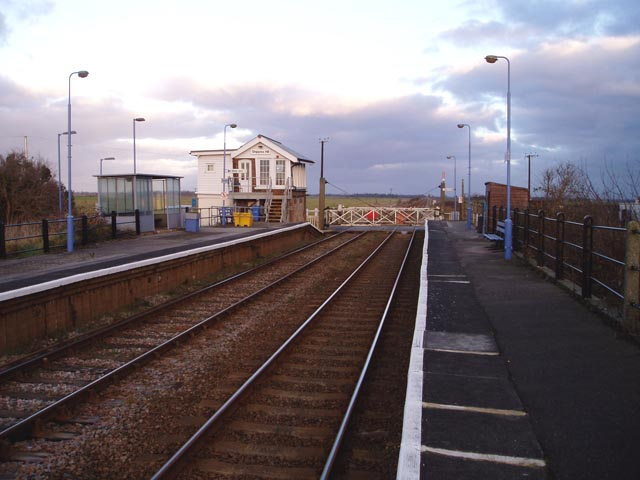
- Shippea Hill station, one of the least used stations in the entire country.
  Shippea Hill on the Breckland line to Norwich. Shippea Hill is served at 07:26 Mondays–Fridays (07:47 Saturday) eastbound (to Norwich) and 16:13 Saturdays only westbound to (Stansted Airport). Operated by Greater Anglia.
- Lakenheath, also on the Breckland line to Norwich. is served by seven trains on a Sunday (4 eastbound, 3 westbound). There are no services Monday–Friday and just a single journey in each direction on Saturdays (11:13 westbound, 15:49 eastbound). Operated by Greater Anglia.
- Buckenham served by one train a day in each direction Monday - Saturday & six trains in each direction on a Sunday. Operated by Greater Anglia.
- Spooner Row & Eccles Road are served by two trains a day in each direction Monday - Friday & one train in each direction on a Saturday. No sunday service Operated by Greater Anglia.
- Harling Road is served by two trains a day in each direction Monday - Saturday. No sunday service Operated by Greater Anglia.
- Polesworth has one train per day Mondays–Saturdays, northbound only at 06:50. After major works on the West Coast Main Line, contractors neglected to replace the footbridge which they had removed, leaving passengers unable to access southbound trains. Operated by West Midlands Trains.
- Lelant Saltings, in Cornwall has been served by one train in each direction daily since the Park & Ride facility at the station moved to nearby St Erth. Operated by Great Western Railway.
- Ardwick, in Manchester is served by a single train in each direction Monday to Saturday and no Sunday service. Operated by Northern Trains.
- Elton and Orston in Nottinghamshire is served by a single train in each direction Monday to Saturday and no Sunday service. Operated by East Midlands Railway.
- Clifton, in Greater Manchester is served by a single train in each direction Monday to Saturday and no Sunday service. Operated by Northern Trains.
- Pegswood, Widdrington & Acklington are served by one northbound and two southbound Monday to Saturday and no Sunday service. Operated by Northern Trains.
- Chathill is served by two arrivals and two departures Monday to Saturday and no Sunday service. Operated by Northern Trains.
- Heysham Port is served by one arrival departure everyday connecting to the Isle of Man Steam Packet Company sailings to Douglas. Operated by Northern Trains.
- Sankey for Penketh is served by two trains in each direction Monday to Saturday and no Sunday service. Operated by Northern Trains.
- Combe and Finstock stations are served by single train in each direction Monday - Friday with no weekend service. Operated by Great Western Railway.
- Havenhouse, Hubberts Bridge & Swineshead on the Poacher Line are only served by two trains in each direction Monday to Saturday. Operated by East Midlands Railway
- Bordesley is served by a single train on Saturdays only, however the station remains open for use when Birmingham City Football Club are playing at home when additional services call there. Operated by West Midlands Trains.

In the mid-1990s British Rail was forced to serve Smethwick West in the West Midlands for an extra 12 months after a legal blunder meant that the station had not been closed properly. One train per week each way still called at Smethwick West, even though it was only a few hundred yards from the replacement Smethwick Galton Bridge.

Many least used stations are also served infrequently or irregularly.

== Bustitution ==
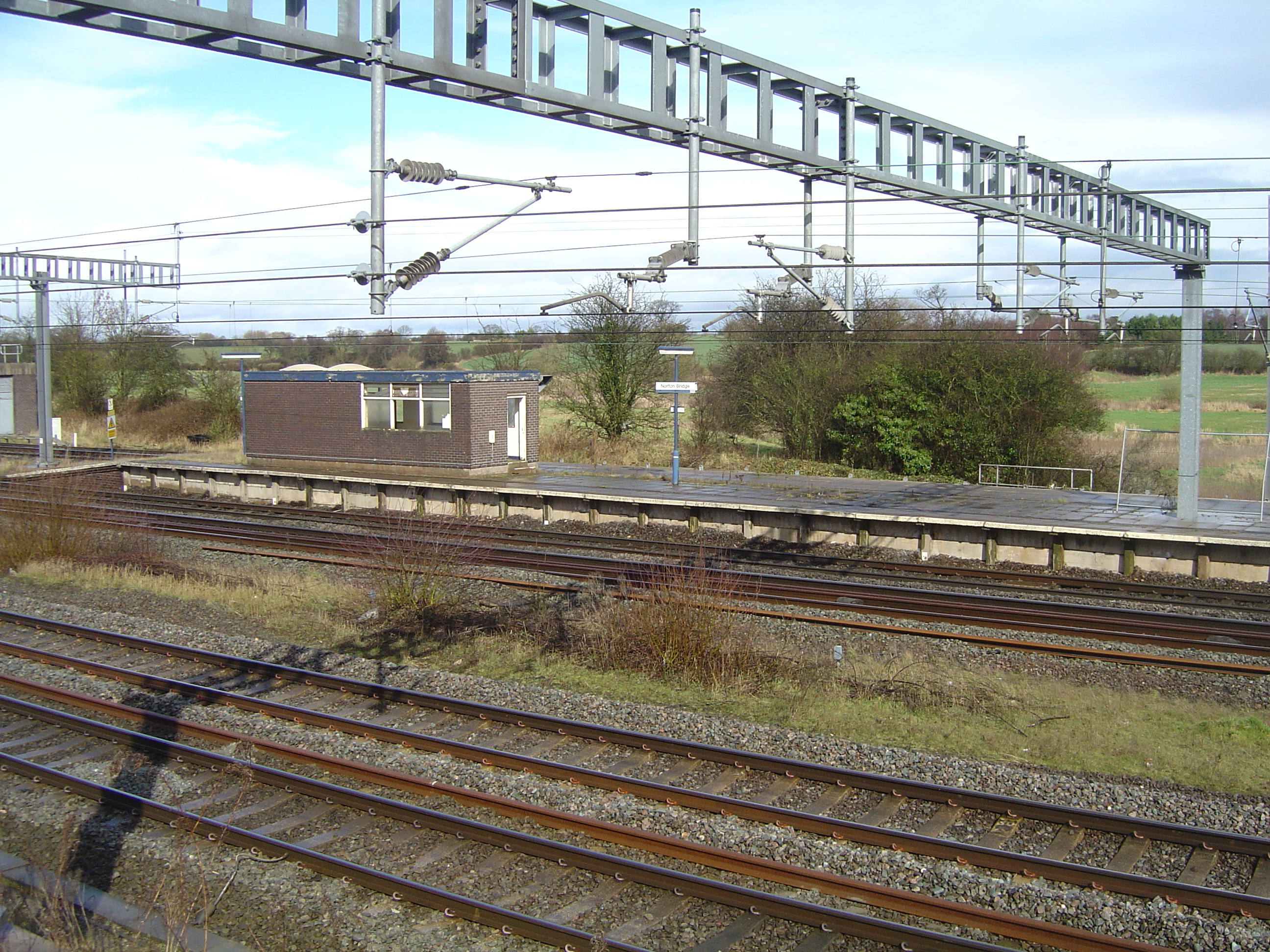
Norton Bridge was served by a replacement bus until March 2019.

A variant of the parliamentary train service was the temporary replacement bus service, as employed between Watford and Croxley Green in Hertfordshire. The railway line was closed to trains in 1996, but to avoid the legal complications and costs of actual closure train services were replaced by buses, thus maintaining the legal fiction of an open railway. The branch was officially closed in 2003. Work in track clearance commenced, beginning the work to absorb most of the route into a diversion of the Watford branch of the Metropolitan line into Watford Junction, but work was stopped in 2016 after a reassessment of likely costs and lack of agreement on funding.

The temporary replacement bus tactic was used from December 2008 between Ealing Broadway and Wandsworth Road when Arriva CrossCountry withdrew its services from Brighton to Manchester, which was the only passenger service between Factory Junction, north of Wandsworth Road, and Latchmere Junction, on the West London Line. This service was later replaced by a single daily return train between Kensington Olympia and Wandsworth Road (as above) operated by Southern until formal consultation commenced and closure was completed in 2013.

The replacement bus tactic was used to service Norton Bridge, Barlaston and Wedgwood stations on the Stafford–Manchester line, which had its passenger services withdrawn in 2004 to allow more Virgin CrossCountry and Virgin Trains West Coast services to be operated. Norton Bridge station was closed in December 2017 coinciding with the transfer of the West Midlands franchise from London Midland to West Midlands Trains, with funding for the bus service to Norton Bridge continuing until March 2019.

== See also ==
- Closure by stealth
- List of least used railway stations of Great Britain
- Rail replacement bus service
- Stations still open but with no services

== Bibliography ==
- Billson, P. (1996). Derby and the Midland Railway. Derby: Breedon Books.
- Jordana, Jacint; Levi-Faur, David (2004). The politics of regulation: institutions and regulatory reforms for the age of governance. Edward Elgar Publishing. ISBN 978-1-84376-464-9.
- Ransom, P. J. G. (1990). The Victorian Railway and How It Evolved. London: Heinemann.
- Calder, Simon (2 April 2011). "Missed the bus? The route that runs only four times year". BBC.
