= Rail replacement bus service =

Substitution of railway services by buses

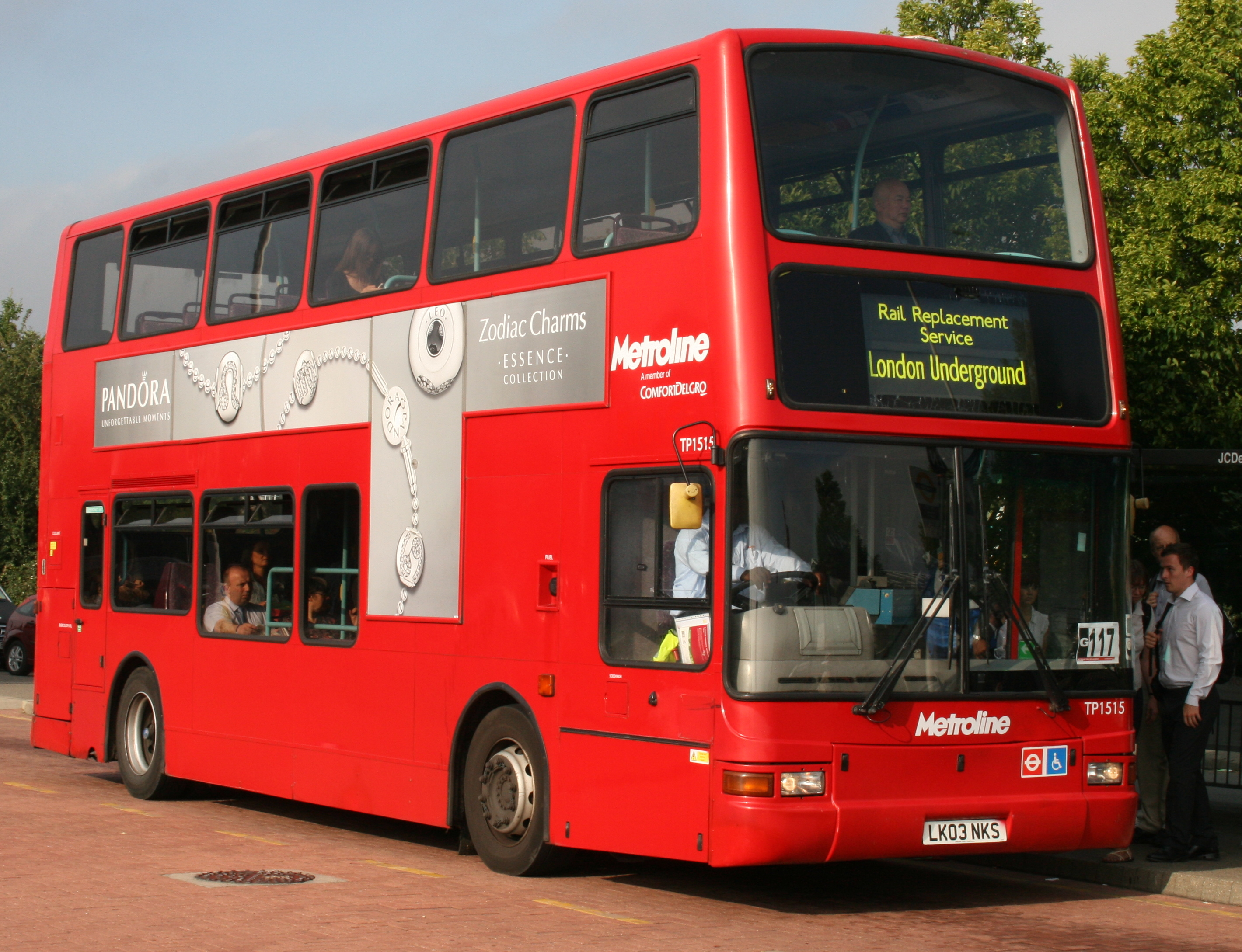
A Metroline Plaxton President bodied Dennis Trident 2 rail replacement bus in London

A rail replacement bus service replaces a passenger train service on a temporary or permanent basis. The train service that is replaced may be of any type such as light rail, tram, streetcar, commuter rail, regional rail or heavy rail inter-city passenger service. The railway service may be replaced if the line is closed because of rail maintenance, a breakdown of a train, a rail accident or a strike action; It may simply provide additional capacity or if the railway service is deemed not economically viable.

Terms for a rail replacement bus service include bustitution (a portmanteau of the words "bus" and "substitution", or bustitute) and bus bridge. Substitution of rail services by buses can be unpopular and subject to criticism, so the term bustitution is often used pejoratively.

== Examples ==
=== Australia ===
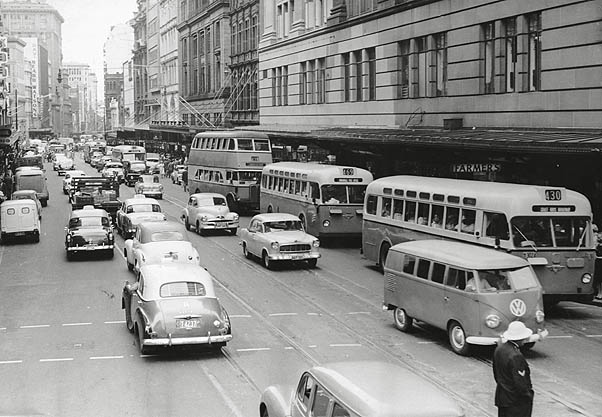
Traffic in Sydney, after the replacement of trams by buses (1962)

In November 1941, Western Australian Government Railways introduced its first rail replacement service, which operated from Perth to Kojonup, via Boddington. By 1949, there were 28 buses and, by 1959, there were more than 50.

The Sydney Metro north-west line used single-deck buses late at night from Wednesdays to Sundays, operating a red Metro bus-like service with a frequency of approximately every 10 minutes until November 2019. That measure was in place since the line was deemed "ready" ten months ahead of schedule.

On the Queensland Rail network, to relieve congestion on the single tracked Sunshine Coast line, the railway service is supplemented by a bus service operated by Kangaroo Bus Lines on weekdays between Caboolture and Nambour as route 649. NSW TrainLink, Transwa and V/Line all introduced extensive networks in New South Wales, Western Australia and Victoria in the 1970s and 1980s that replaced regional trains.

=== Canada ===
Via Rail, the operator of the national passenger rail network, also uses the term bustitution to refer to replacement of railway services with buses.

=== China ===
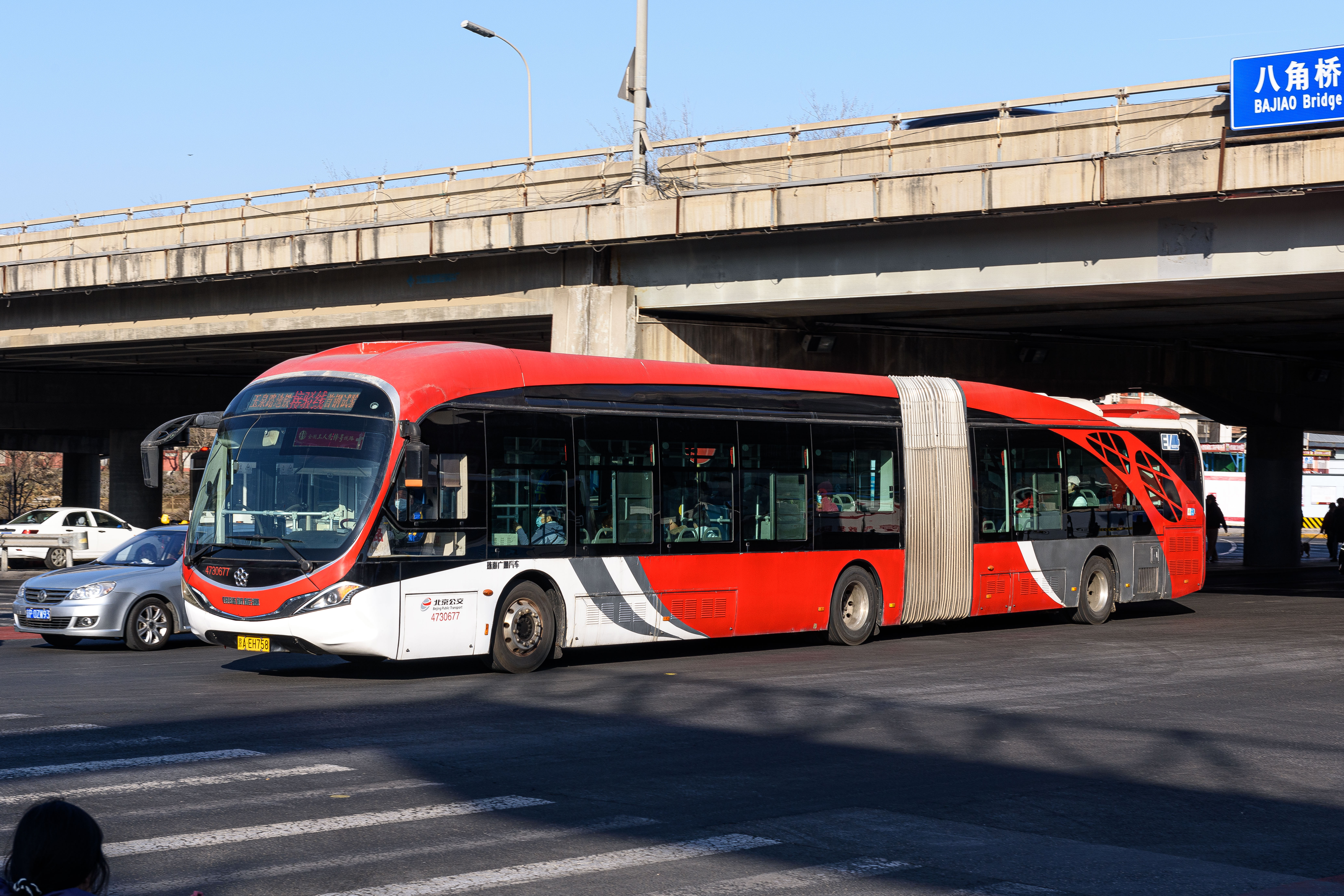
Beijing Public Transport rail replacement bus from Gucheng to Yuquan Lu (February 2026)

From February 15 to the end of May 2026, the Gucheng and Babaoshan stations of Beijing Subway Line 1 were closed due to the construction of the connection point of the Line 1 branch line. The western end was shortened to start from Yuquanlu Station. Beijing Bus launched the Yuquanlu Metro Connection Temporary Line, which runs from Yuquan_Lu_station along Metro Line 1 to Shougang Experimental Plant . At the same time, Route 337 added more services between Yuquan_Lu and Gucheng.

=== Czech Republic ===
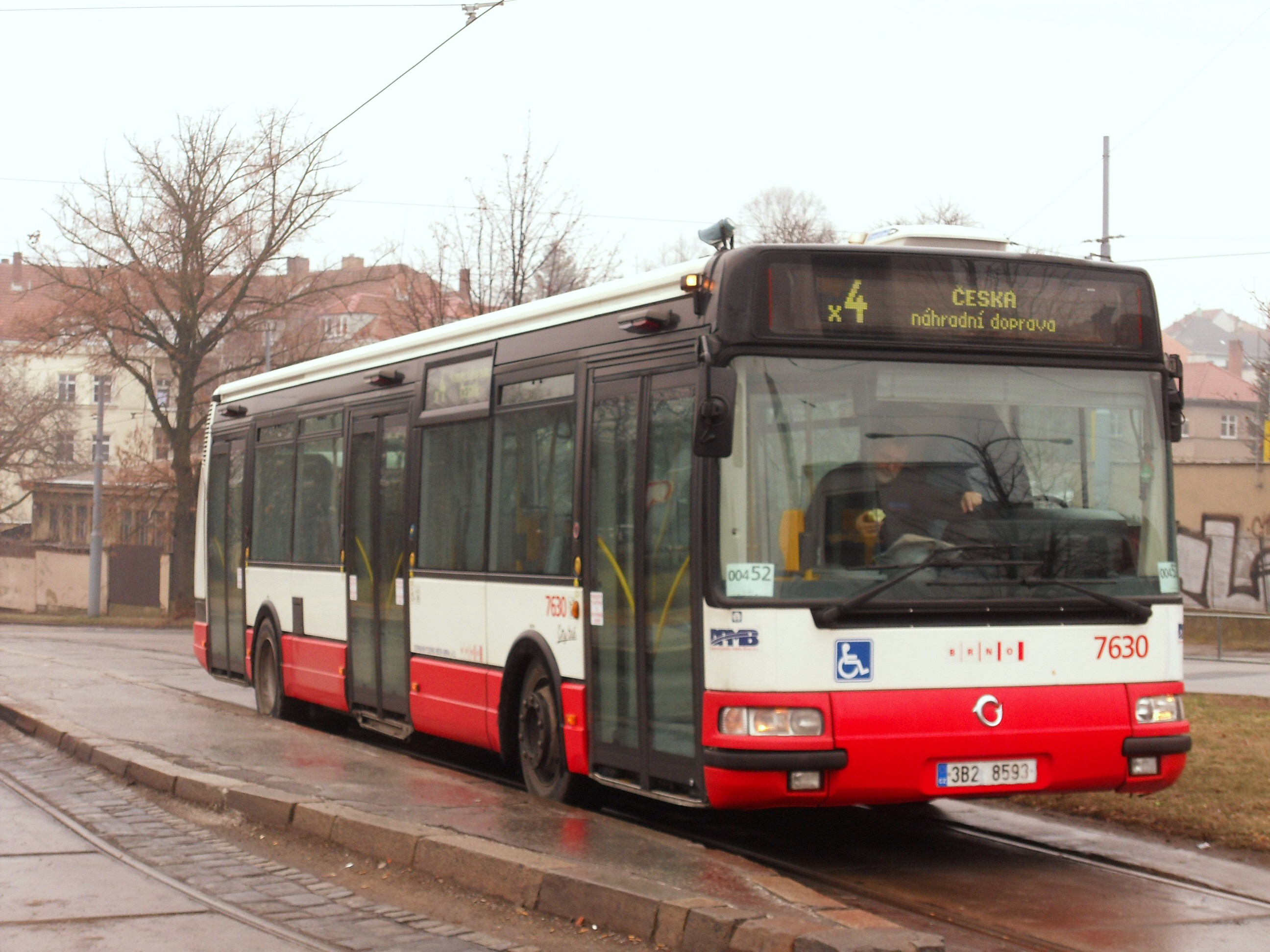
Rail replacement bus service in the Czech Republic

Substitute bus transport (Czech: náhradní autobusová doprava) is governed by the Road Traffic Act (111/1994 Coll.). This allows the operator of a national, regional, tram, trolleybus or special line to operate substitute transport for up to 90 days, in the case of interrupted or temporarily restricted traffic on the line, without the requirement to apply for a bus line licence and have approval of the line's schedule. The law also mandates vehicles used for substitute transport to be marked as such.

In municipal public transport, substitute transport often takes on the number of the line that it replaces, prefixed by the letter X, and the original line is detoured. In cities with trolleybus systems, rail replacement buses are called substitute trolleybus transport.(Czech: náhradní trolejbusová doprava)

=== Ireland ===
As in the United Kingdom, buses have replaced rail services on many closed lines. A recent example can be found in County Wexford, where upon the suspension of rail services between Rosslare Europort and Waterford in 2010, Bus Éireann route 370 was introduced. However, the bus takes considerably longer than the railway journey and fails to serve Waterford railway station.

=== Japan ===
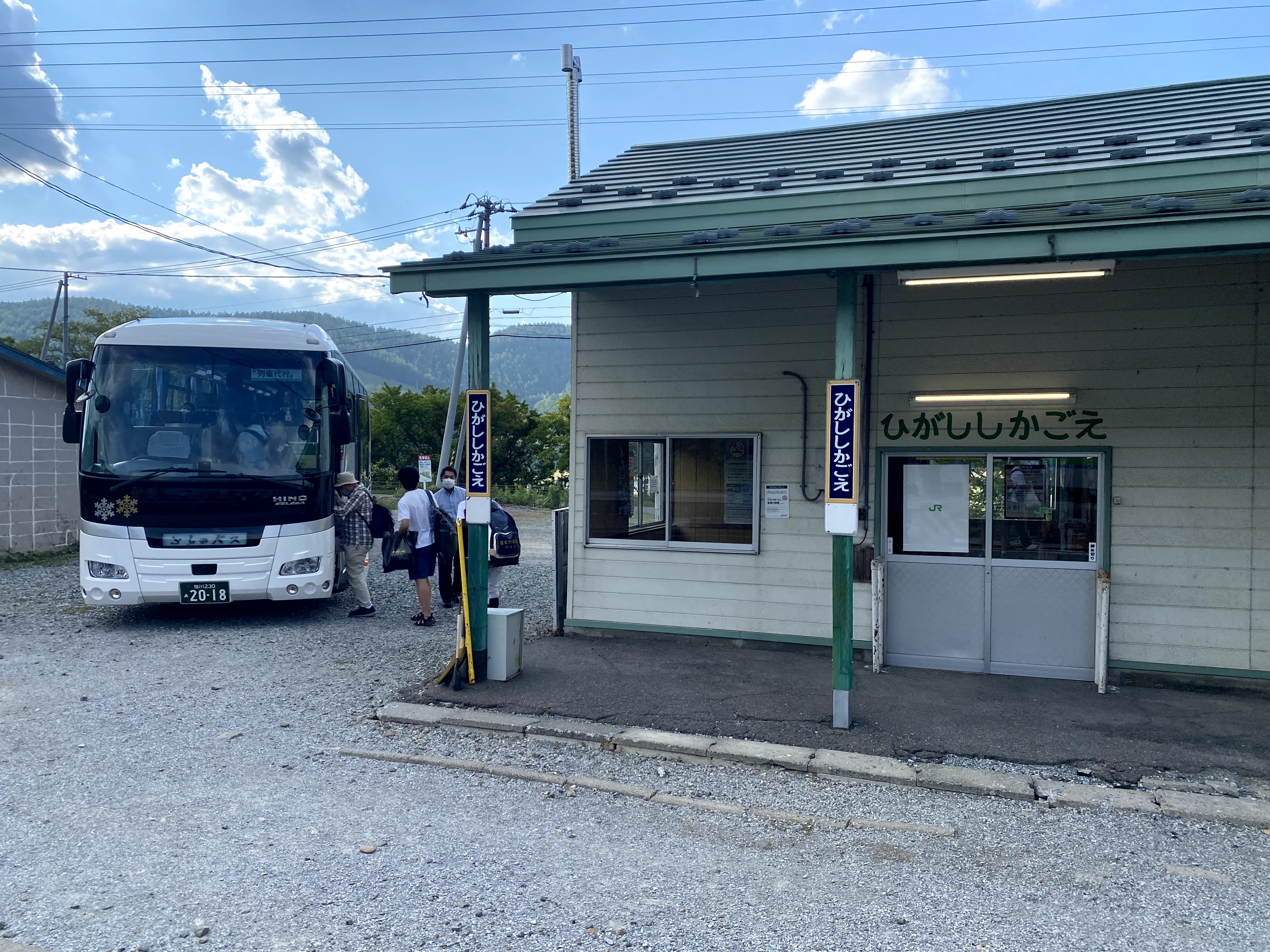
Rail replacement bus in Higashi-Shikagoe station, in Minamifurano, Hokkaido (September 2021)

Buses have replaced trains when railway services must be suspended because of disaster, accident, economics or engineering works. Notably, in some cases, those rail lines are closed permanently and some of the former rail rights-of-way are converted into bus rights-of-way to provide grade-separated bus rapid transit service.

=== New Zealand ===
When train services operated by Auckland One Rail in Auckland are replaced by a bus, the resulting service is called Rail Bus. Historically, New Zealand Railways Road Services replaced many train routes with buses.

=== Singapore ===
An incident occurred on 7 July 2015 after a mass shutdown on the North–South and East–West lines caused by a power system failure. The operator SMRT and rival SBS Transit did not activate bus bridging, but made all bus services free islandwide because of the sheer scale of the disruptions. The Land Transport Authority made public transport available for any bus services passing MRT stations that were affected during the train disruptions and, during a massive disruption affecting at least two lines, bus travel islandwide was made free.

=== Sweden ===
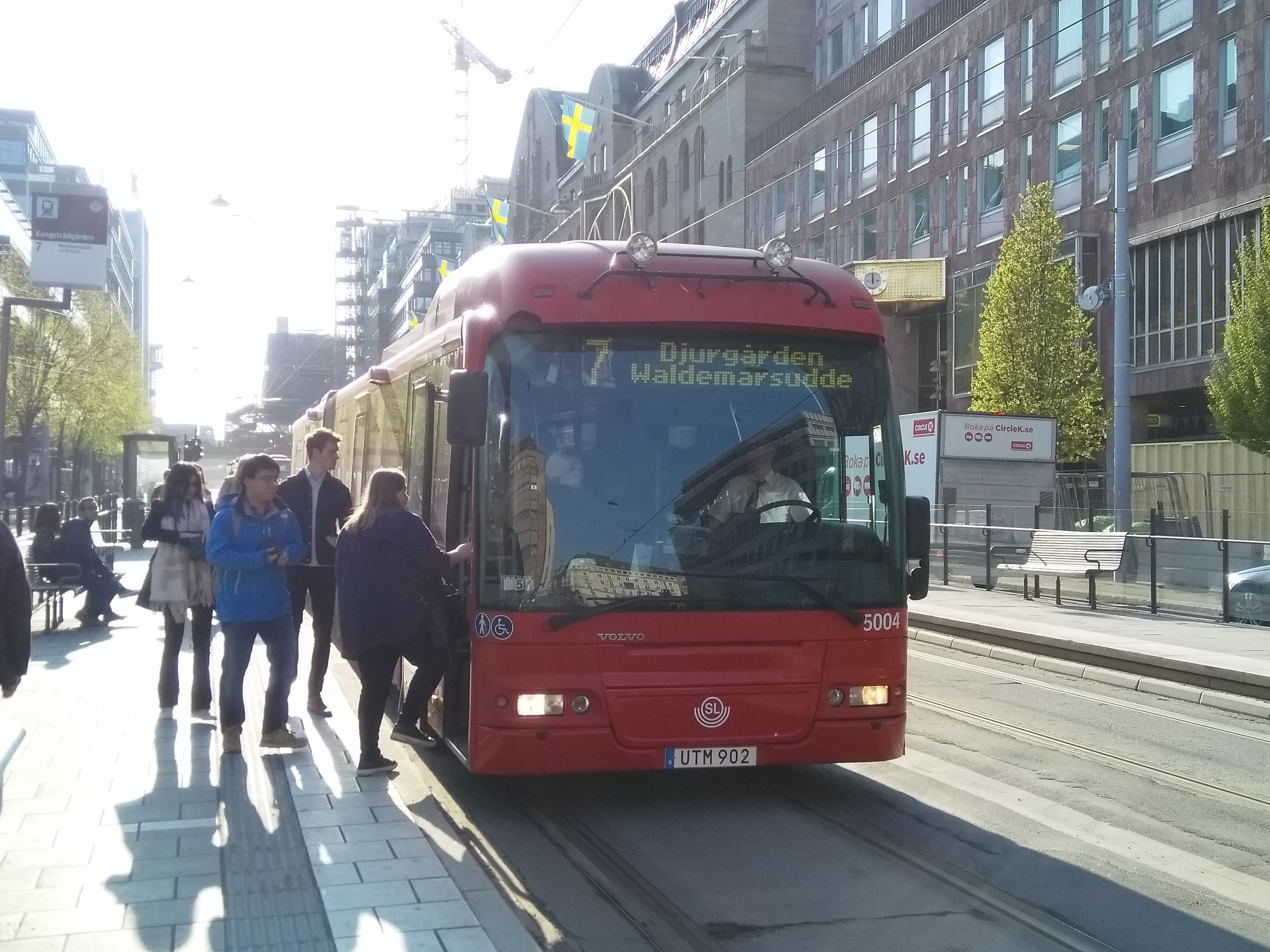
A bus running on Spårväg City tram line 7

While the reconstruction of Slussen, the western terminal of Saltsjöbanan, is in progress, trains on line 25 run only to Henriksdal, one station short of Slussen; the final segment is served by a replacement bus 25B that is timed to match the train times at Henriksdal.

Sometimes, buses can be seen running on line 7, the Spårväg City tram line, even when trams are running normally.

At night after 01:00, there are no services on the Stockholm Metro and the commuter rail system; night buses run along the line instead.

=== United Kingdom ===
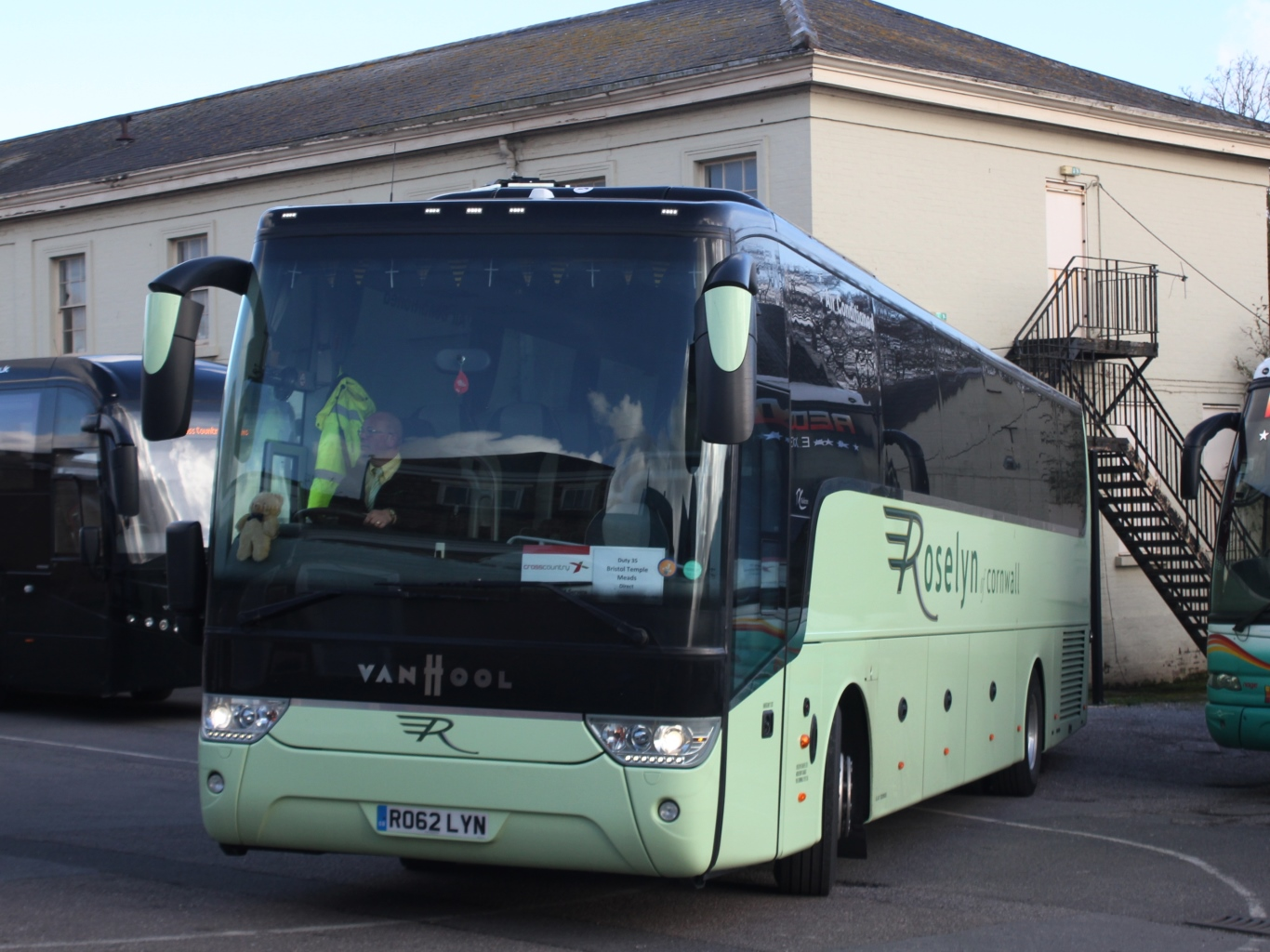
Roselyn Coaches Van Hool TX16 Alicron in Taunton, Somerset (April 2018)

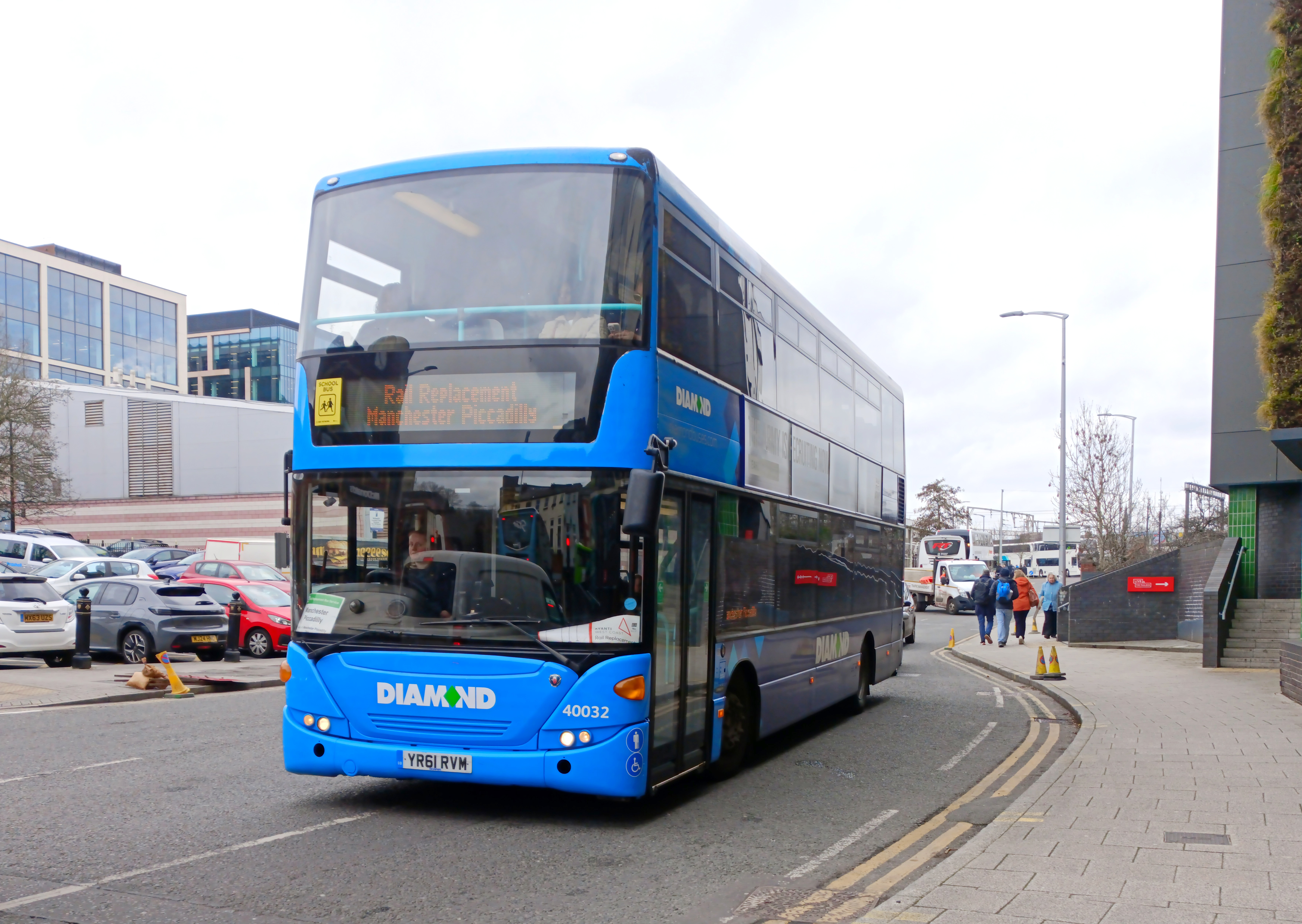
A Diamond North West Scania OmniCity in Stockport (February 2026)

During the British Railways Board's railway rationalisation in the 1960s, known as the Beeching cuts, bus substitution was an official policy for replacing train services on closed lines. The policy was largely unsuccessful, however, as the bus services were usually far slower than the train services that they replaced and many passengers gave up on public transport altogether. A report published in 2018 identified successful, and surviving, examples of this policy, including:

- The present Excel route operated by First Eastern Counties between Norwich and Peterborough
- The Brighton & Hove Regency Route between Brighton and Tunbridge Wells, which partly replaces a route closed by the cuts.

Rail replacement bus services have been used to operate parliamentary train services.

- When Silverlink services between Watford Junction and Croxley Green were withdrawn in March 1996, railway services were replaced by buses to avoid the legal complications and costs of actual closure. The service was withdrawn when the branch was formally closed in September 2003.
- After the withdrawal of Central Trains' services between Stafford and Stoke-on-Trent, to facilitate the West Coast Main Line upgrade at the request of the Strategic Rail Authority in May 2003, BakerBus route X1 was introduced to serve Norton Bridge, Stone, Barlaston and Wedgwood. When the train service was reintroduced by London Midland in December 2008, only Stone regained a rail service and the other stations continued to be served by route X1. In October 2017, the Department for Transport (DfT) declared Norton Bridge station closed, but continued the partial funding of the replacement bus service until March 2019. As of 2023, Barlaston and Wedgwood stations continue to be served by D&G Bus replacement route 100. The DfT funds the contractual service while it seeks a solution to demands for the restoration of the train service. The bustitution has continued for 21 years, as of 2025.
- After the withdrawal of services by Arriva CrossCountry between Reading and Brighton in December 2008, which provided the only passenger services on three short sections of line between Ealing Broadway and Wandsworth Road, a replacement weekly bus service was introduced. The service ceased in June 2013, after a formal closure process had been completed.

=== United States ===
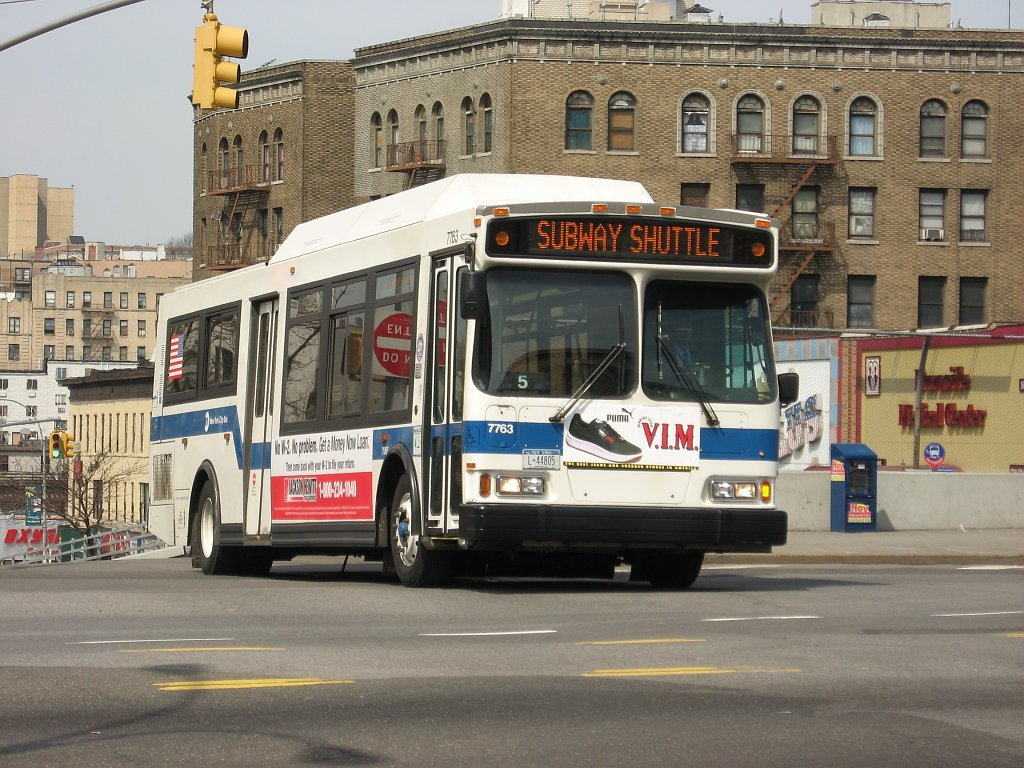
United States: New York City Bus provides shuttle service in the Bronx because of construction on the New York City Subway

Rail replacement bus services occurred on a large scale after the dismantling of the street railway systems of many cities in the mid-20th century. Replacement of existing rail services with buses after World War II is one of the largest reasons why so few cities have rapid transit systems.

The temporary substitution of buses for trains may be done with Amtrak's Amtrak Thruway service.

The G Line (formerly the Orange Line) of the Los Angeles Metro runs along a paved closed course on the easement from the original Southern Pacific Railroad Burbank line, which was later used by the Pacific Electric Railway. It may eventually be converted back to light rail with Measure M funding, but that is not currently scheduled to happen until around 2050.

== Urban transit ==
Rail replacement bus services are common among urban rail transit systems, mainly because of unexpected service disruptions. For example, one of the effects of Hurricane Sandy in New York was that the New York City Subway required replacement bus service for several subway routes. As the subway runs 24/7/365, replacement bus service may be provided when subway lines are closed for regularly scheduled maintenance, even during off-peak hours.

== See also ==
- Abandonment (legal) § Abandonment of public transportation systems
- Beeching cuts in the United Kingdom
- Bus rapid transit
- Effects of the car on societies
- Rail trail
- Transport economics.
