= Barlaston railway station =

Railway station in Staffordshire, England

Coordinates: 52.943°N 2.168°W

Barlaston
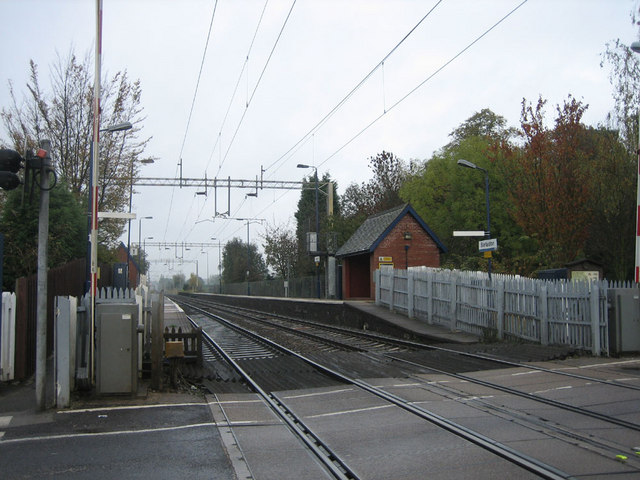

General information
- Location: Barlaston, Stafford; England
- Grid reference: SJ888383
- Manager: West Midlands Railway
- Platforms: 2

Other information
- Station code: BRT
- Classification: DfT category F2

Key dates
- 17 April 1848: Opened
- 23 May 2004: Services withdrawn
Location

Barlaston railway station served the village of Barlaston in Staffordshire, England. This station was opened on 17 April 1848 and is on the first line opened by the North Staffordshire Railway on that date. At some times it was called Barlaston and Tittensor after the slightly more distant village of Tittensor.

== History ==
Trains no longer stop at Barlaston. The Stafford to Stoke-on-Trent local service was withdrawn when the route was temporarily closed for major refurbishment on 23 May 2004 as part of the West Coast Main Line modernisation scheme and never reinstated. Passengers are now served by bus service No 100 operated by D&G Bus, which acts as the station's official rail replacement bus service, on which valid rail tickets (including advance purchase tickets) to/from Wedgwood and Barlaston are officially accepted. Access to the platforms is no longer possible as the station has been fenced off.

Barlaston is not included as a stop on the Crewe – Stafford service operated by West Midlands Trains. The new franchise, West Midlands Trains may see the station reopened to passenger services.

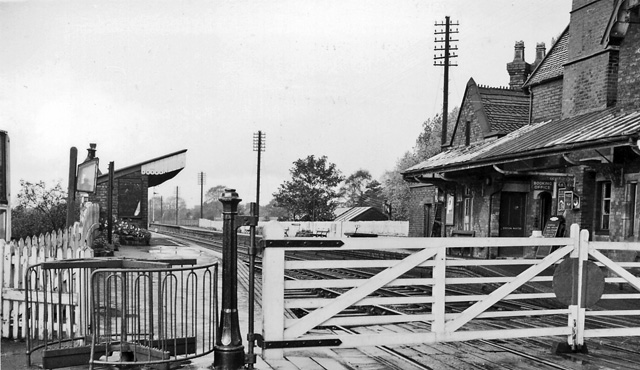
The station in 1961

Barlaston is mentioned in the ghost or parliamentary train list maintained by the Ghost Train Hunters enthusiasts group. The North Staffs Rail Promotion Group campaign for the restoration of the train service continues.

The Department for Transport stated that the rail replacement service would continue whilst it sought a "sustainable solution" to the demand for the restoration of train services when it awarded the West Midlands Rail franchise in 2018. As from April 2021 it funds this rail replacement service in accordance with Passenger Service Level Commitment No 2 of 2008. The bustitution is currently in its twenty second year, allegedly the longest running scheduled rail replacement in history.

Plans to officially close Wedgwood to passengers, and reopen Barlaston, were planned for December 2020 or May 2021, as of October 2018. However no Notice of Closure for Wedgwood has been published and there is no service at Barlaston. No notice of closure had been issued for Barlaston.

== See also ==
- Railway stations not officially closed with no services in the United Kingdom

Preceding station	Historical railways	Following station
Wedgwood; Line open, station not served by rail	Central Trains; Stafford to Manchester Line	Stone; Line and station open
