= Closure by stealth =

Deliberate downgrading of a service

Closure by stealth is a term most frequently used in the UK and Ireland to refer to the deliberate downgrading of a service by the management or owners with the intention of driving away users or customers. The aim is to make the service uneconomical, and thereby justify its closure or withdrawal. It is most widely used in the case of government-regulated services, where a company needs permission from local government or central government to withdraw a service.

== Railways ==
The classic examples of closure by stealth involve UK railway services. These are often regulated at some level by local or national government, and the only way the owner can withdraw such a service is by demonstrating that the local population no longer needs that service. Some of the UK rail closures made under the Beeching Axe while British Rail were operating services were justified at the time by deliberately not including future efficiencies and bringing forward many years of future costs into a short time frame to show, by accounting, that the route was not sustainable. By degrading the quality of the service – for example by scheduling trains to run at inconvenient times or frequencies (known as parliamentary train services), in one direction only (trains serving a certain station on their outward but not on their return journey, examples include Polesworth and Pilning) or by raising fares – transport operators can force passengers to take other modes of transport, justifying the view of the service owner that the service is no longer required (a kind of self-fulfilling prophecy).

== Other services ==
Apparent closures by stealth have been observed in other services, such as post offices, hospitals, public libraries and magistrates' courts.

== See also ==
- Deprecation
- Enshittification
