= Stafford–Manchester line =

Railway line in England

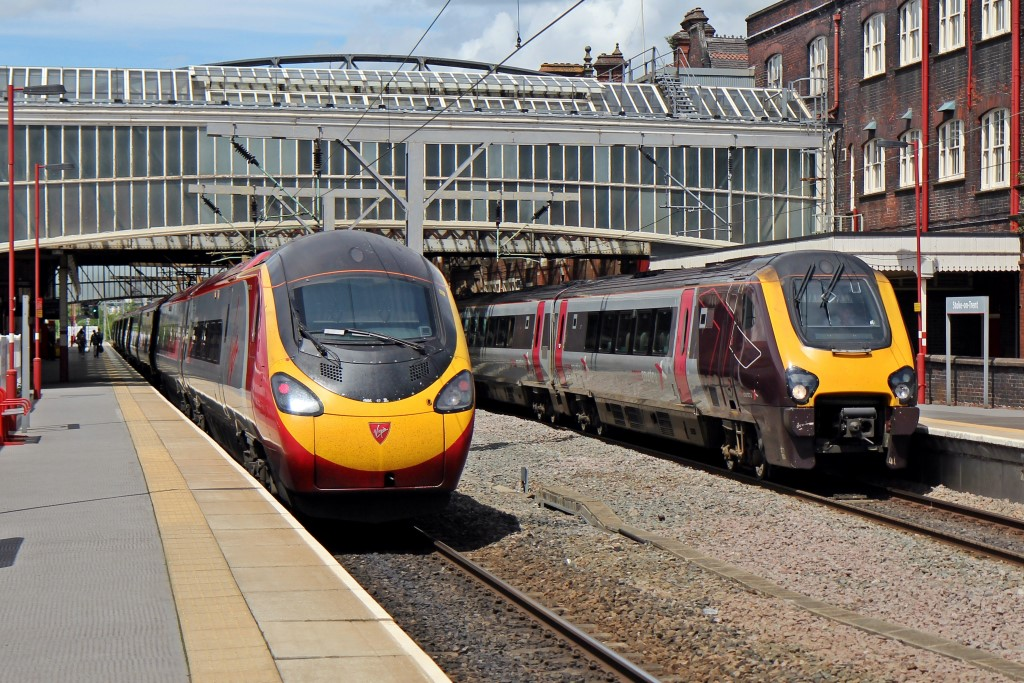
- A Virgin Trains Class 390 and CrossCountry Class 221 at Stoke-on-Trent

Overview
- Owner: Network Rail
- Locale: Cheshire, Greater Manchester, Staffordshire, Stoke-on-Trent, West Midlands (region), North West England

Service
- System: National Rail
- Operator(s): Avanti West Coast, CrossCountry, East Midlands Railway, London Northwestern Railway, Northern Trains
- Rolling stock: Class 220 Voyager, Class 221 Super Voyager, Class 323, Class 331 Civity, Class 350 Desiro, Class 390 Pendolino

History
- Opened: 1848

Technical
- Line length: 53.9 miles (86.7 km)
- Track gauge: 1,435 mm (4 ft 8 1/2 in) standard gauge
Route map
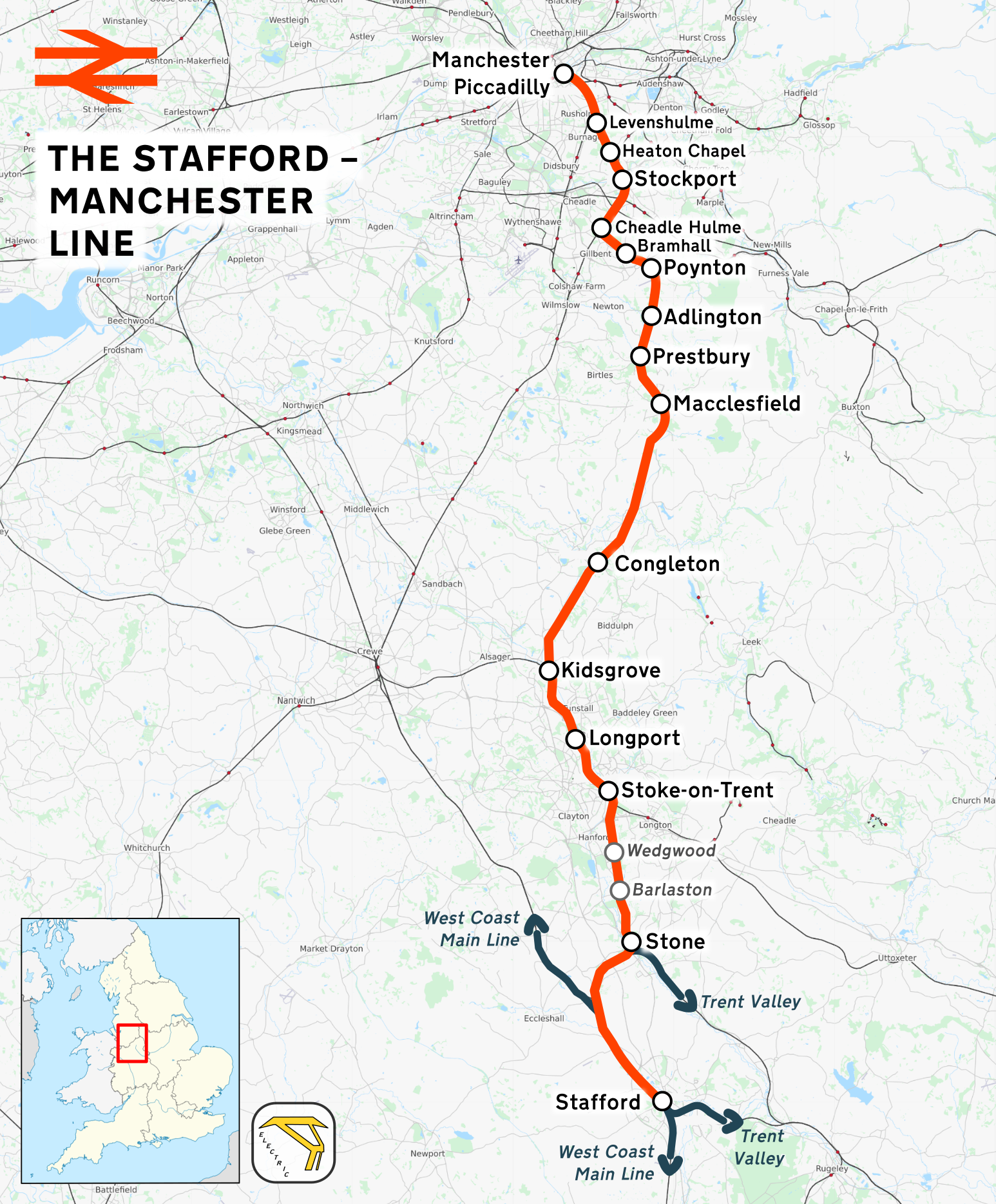
(Click to expand)

The Stafford–Manchester line is a major railway line branching from the West Coast Main Line serving Stafford, Stone, Stoke-on-Trent, Kidsgrove, Congleton, Macclesfield, Cheadle Hulme, Stockport and Manchester.

== History ==
The line was completed in 1848. It incorporated the main line of the North Staffordshire Railway, from the junction with the London and North Western Railway (LNWR) at Norton Bridge, via its principal station at Stoke-on-Trent, to Macclesfield. It then made a running junction, again with the LNWR, which had its own station at Macclesfield Hibel Road that was closed by British Railways in 1960.

The North Staffordshire Railway became part of the London, Midland and Scottish Railway in 1923.

The line was electrified at 25 kV AC, using overhead wires, under British Railways' 1955 Modernisation Plan.

== Services ==
=== Avanti West Coast ===
Avanti West Coast operates inter-city services between London Euston and Manchester Piccadilly, via the Colwich spur. Some services between London Euston and Manchester Piccadilly travel along the Stone to Colwich line, thereby by-passing Stafford.

=== CrossCountry ===
CrossCountry operates services between Manchester Piccadilly and Birmingham New Street, which continue either to Bournemouth or Bristol Temple Meads. Between Cheadle Hulme, where it joins the Crewe–Manchester line, and Manchester Piccadilly, the line forms part of Network Rail Route 20.

=== London Northwestern Railway ===
Local services between Stafford, Stone and Stoke-on-Trent, are operated by West Midlands Trains; they are branded London Northwestern Railway. Services continue to Crewe.

Between 2004 and 2008, there was no stopping service on the route, with a replacement bus service taking its place. However Wedgwood and Barlaston stations are still without a train service, although they were never officially closed and are still served by rail-replacement bus services. Norton Bridge also lost its services at the same time but was formally closed in December 2017, after 13 years without a rail service.

=== Northern Trains ===
Frequent local services between Stoke-on-Trent, Congleton, Stockport and Manchester Piccadilly are operated by Northern Trains.

=== East Midlands Railway ===
The Derby to Crewe Line, operated by East Midlands Railway, shares the Stafford to Manchester Line between Stoke-on-Trent and Kidsgrove.
