= Stone railway station =

Railway station in Staffordshire, England

Stone
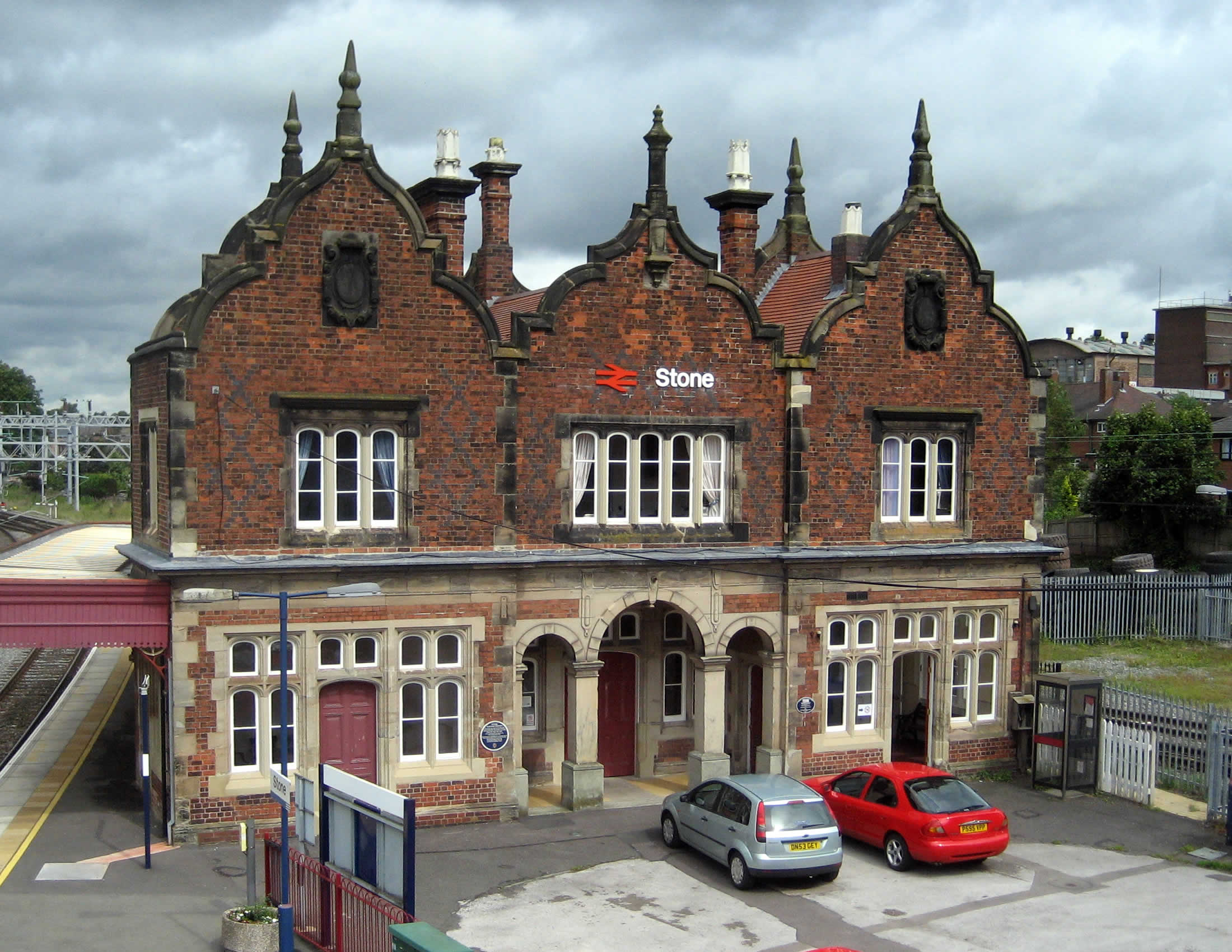

General information
- Location: Stone, Stafford; England
- Coordinates: 52.908°N 2.155°W
- Grid reference: SJ896345
- Manager: West Midlands Railway
- Platforms: 2

Other information
- Station code: SNE
- Classification: DfT category F2

History
- Original company: North Staffordshire Railway
- Pre-grouping: North Staffordshire Railway
- Post-grouping: London, Midland and Scottish Railway

Key dates
- 17 April 1848: First station opened as Stone
- 1 May 1849: Station relocated
- January 1888: Renamed Stone Junction
- ?: Renamed Stone
- 1947: Colwich platforms closed
- 24 May 2004: Services withdrawn
- 15 December 2008: Services reinstated

Passengers
- 2021/22: ▲0.172 million
- 2022/23: ▲0.214 million
- 2023/24: ▲0.233 million
- 2024/25: ▲0.246 million
- 2025/26: ▲0.252 million

Listed Building – Grade II
- Feature: Stone railway station
- Designated: 27 July 1972
- Reference no.: 1297502
Location
Notes
- Passenger statistics from the Office of Rail and Road

Stone railway station serves the market town of Stone, in Staffordshire, England. It is located on a junction of the Colwich to Manchester spur of the West Coast Main Line, but has platforms only on the branch from Stafford to Stoke-on-Trent.

== History ==
There have been two stations at Stone and both were opened by the North Staffordshire Railway. The first opened on 17 April 1848 and was next to the Newcastle Road bridge. With the opening of the Colwich line on 1 May 1849, the original station was closed and replaced the same day by the current station. The station was renamed Stone Junction in January 1888, but reverted to the original name Stone at some point between 1923 and 1947. The Colwich platforms were closed in 1947 and subsequently removed.

The station building has been redeveloped by Stone Town Council as a community centre.

APTIS ticketing here ceased in 1993, when the station became unstaffed.

=== Service withdrawal and reinstatement ===
In 2004, rail services were withdrawn from the station and were replaced by buses, operated by BakerBus; this was initially whilst upgrade work was carried out on the Stafford and Colwich to Cheadle Hulme lines. However, the Stafford to Stoke local service, that formerly called here, was never reinstated once the work was completed; the units used on it were redeployed in the West Midlands and so the rail replacement service continued. The Trent Valley local service, between Stafford and Coventry, also suffered the same fate.

Virgin CrossCountry were reportedly going to reinstate Stone as a stop from June 2006 on the Birmingham to Manchester service, but this never materialised.

In December 2008, Stone station reopened for an hourly train service between Crewe and London Euston, as part of a new revamped West Coast Main Line timetable unveiled by the Department for Transport. This service was operated by London Midland and then London Northwestern Railway, until its withdrawal.

=== Former services ===
The new West Midlands franchise saw the former Euston to Crewe trains replaced by a new Birmingham–Wolverhampton–Stoke–Crewe service that stopped here. The London service was changed to one via Birmingham, despite opposition against losing a direct link to London.

The Birmingham service was cut back in December 2023 to start at Stafford, with Stone losing its direct links to Birmingham and Wolverhampton.

== Service ==
Stone is currently served by the hourly London Northwestern Railway services that operate in both directions between Stafford and Crewe, via Stoke-on-Trent, Longport, Kidsgrove and Alsager.

Trains operated by CrossCountry and Avanti West Coast pass through the station, but do not stop here.

Preceding station	National Rail	Following station
Stoke-on-Trent towards Crewe	London Northwestern Railway Stafford–Crewe	Stafford Terminus
Historical railways
Barlaston and Tittensor Line open, station not served by rail	North Staffordshire Railway Stafford to Manchester Line	Norton Bridge Line open, station closed
Barlaston and Tittensor Line open, station not served by rail	North Staffordshire Railway Stone to Colwich Line	Aston-by-Stone Line open, station closed

== Gallery ==
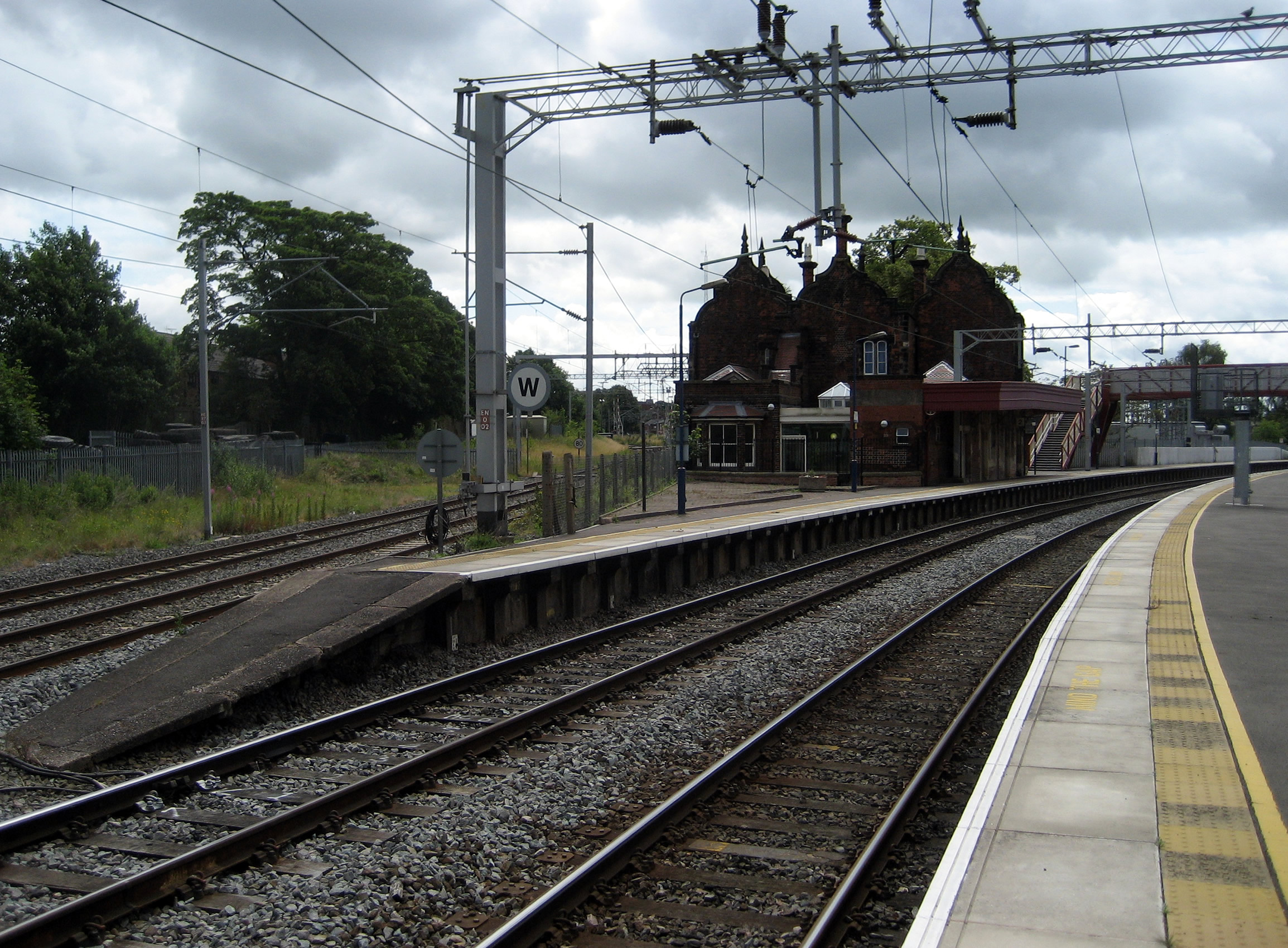
Looking south, with the line to Colwich Junction to the left and Norton Bridge to the right

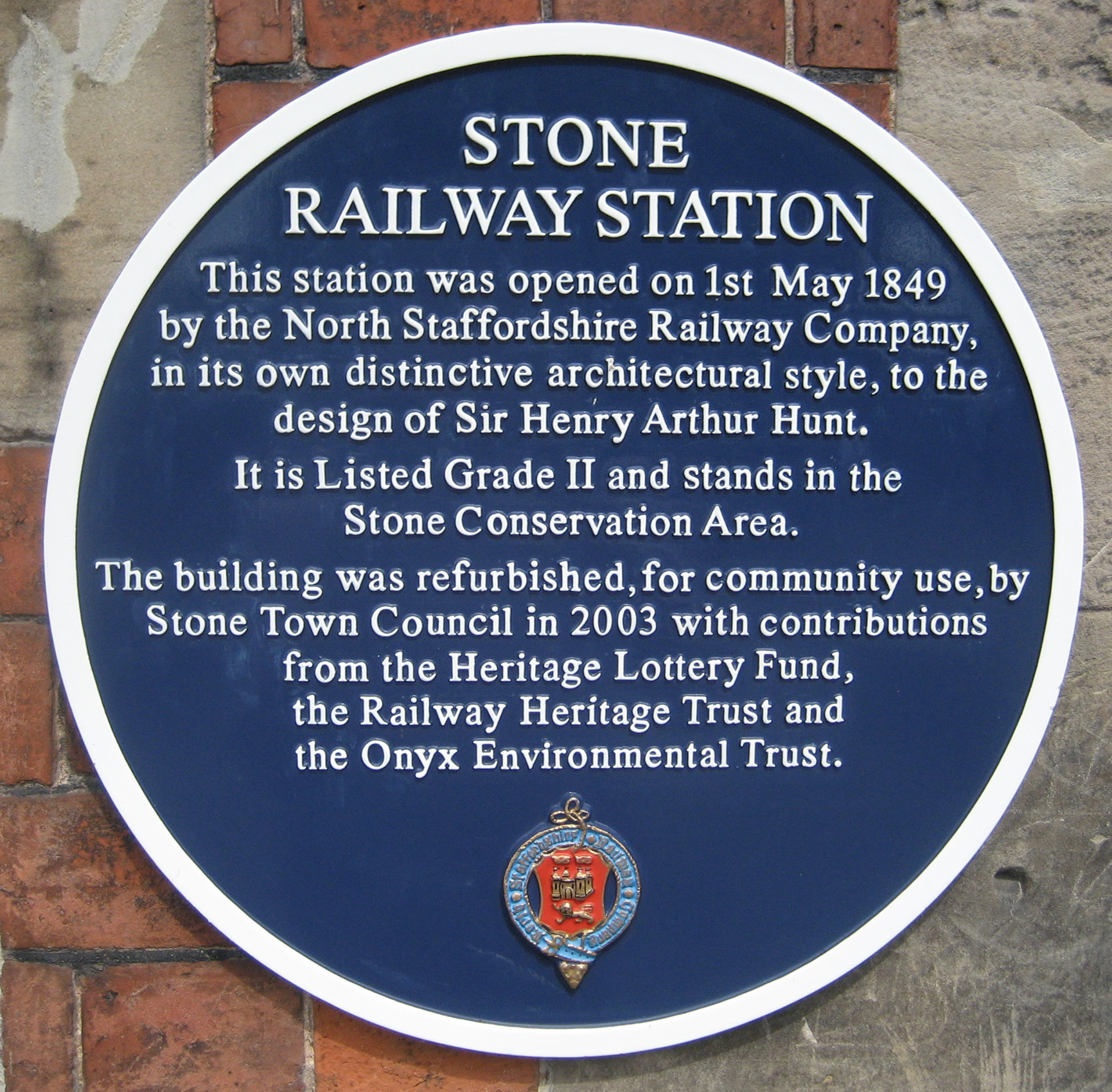
Plaque on the station facade

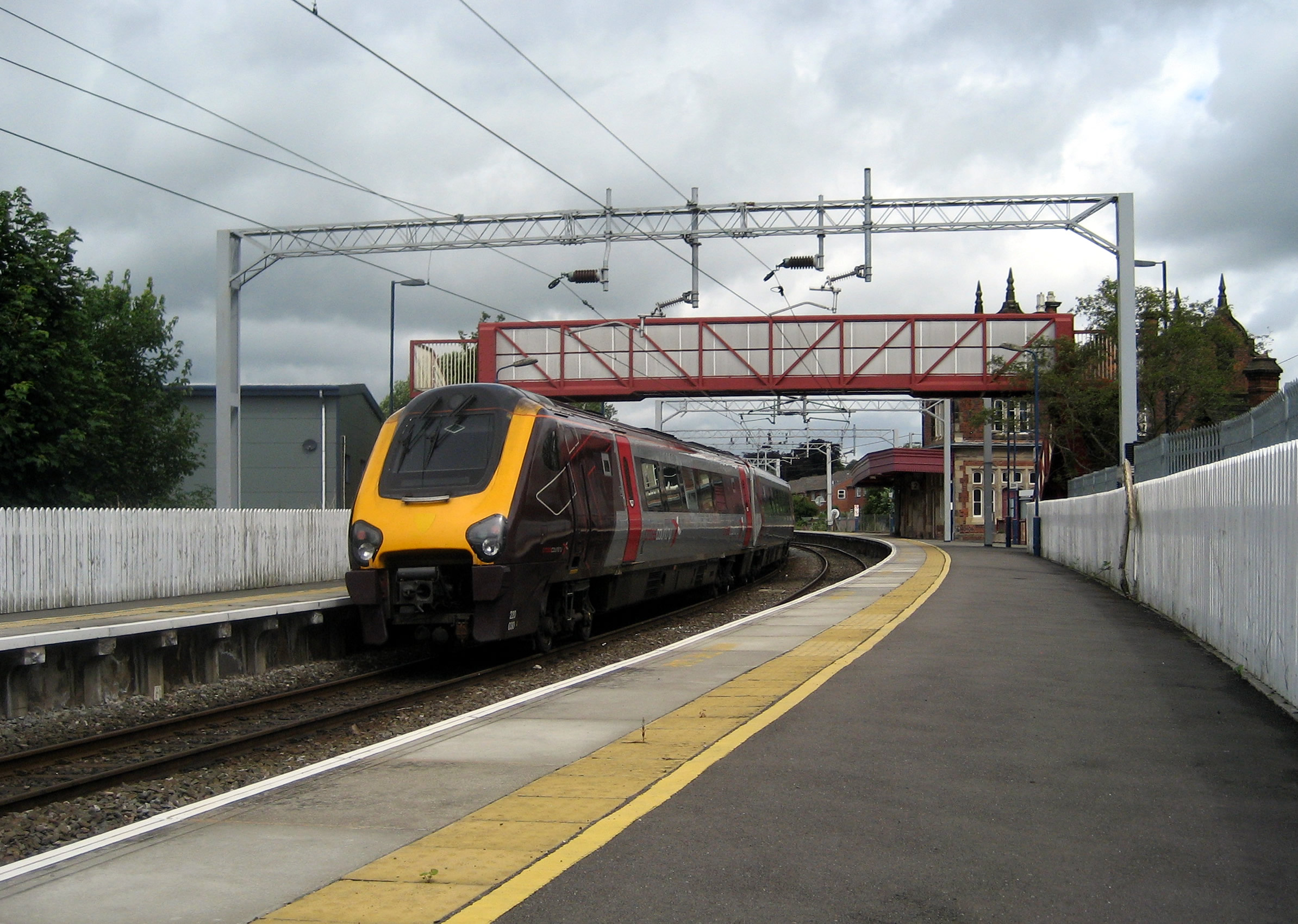
A CrossCountry Class 220 Voyager unit heading north towards Stoke-on-Trent

== See also ==
- Listed buildings in Stone, Staffordshire
