= Wedgwood railway station =

Railway station in Staffordshire, England

Coordinates: 52.951°N 2.171°W

Wedgwood
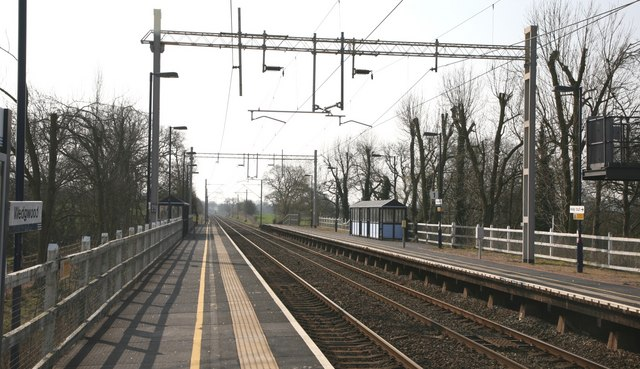
- Wedgwood station in 2007

General information
- Location: Barlaston, Stafford; England
- Grid reference: SJ886393
- Manager: West Midlands Trains
- Platforms: 2

Other information
- Station code: WED
- Classification: DfT category F2

Key dates
- 1 January 1940: Opened as Wedgwood Halt
- 14 June 1965: Renamed Wedgwood
- 23 May 2004: Service withdrawn
Location

Wedgwood railway station served the Wedgwood complex in Barlaston, Staffordshire, England. Although the station is not officially closed, there has been no train service at the station since 2004 and it is instead served by a rail replacement bus in the form of the 100 operated by D&G Bus

== History ==
The station was opened by the London Midland & Scottish Railway on 1 January 1940 to serve the Wedgwood complex in Staffordshire, England. Nearby is Barlaston Hall, and the station also serves the village of Trentham, in Stoke-on-Trent.

It was originally named Wedgwood Halt, and was renamed Wedgwood on 14 June 1965. From 23 May 2004 the line through the station was temporarily closed for major refurbishment work, but upon completion the station was not re-opened; the tracks through the station are still regularly used but trains do not stop there. Along with nearby Barlaston, a rail replacement bus serves the station instead, operated by D&G 100, which accepts valid rail tickets.

The station is currently threatened with complete closure – it was formerly served by the Stoke-on-Trent to Stafford stopping service, but was not included as a stop on the Crewe–London Euston service run by then-operator London Midland. There were plans to have it re-opened to traffic in 2018 when the next West Midlands rail franchise started. This did not happen in 2018, although the new franchise tender includes proposals to reinstate either this station or Barlaston as a stop on a new Birmingham - Stoke - Crewe service.

Access to the platforms is no longer possible as the station has been fenced off. Network Rail have erected signs saying the platforms are structurally unsafe.

Plans to officially close the station to passengers, and reopen Barlaston, were planned for May 2021. However no Notice of Closure for Wedgwood has been published and there is no service at Barlaston.

== See also ==
- Railway stations not officially closed with no services in the United Kingdom

Preceding station	Historical railways	Following station
Stoke-on-Trent; Line and station open	Central Trains; Stafford to Manchester Line	Barlaston; Line open, station not served by rail
Trentham Line open, station closed	London, Midland and Scottish Railway Stafford to Manchester Line	Barlaston and Tittensor Line open, station not served by rail
