= Museum of Military Medicine =

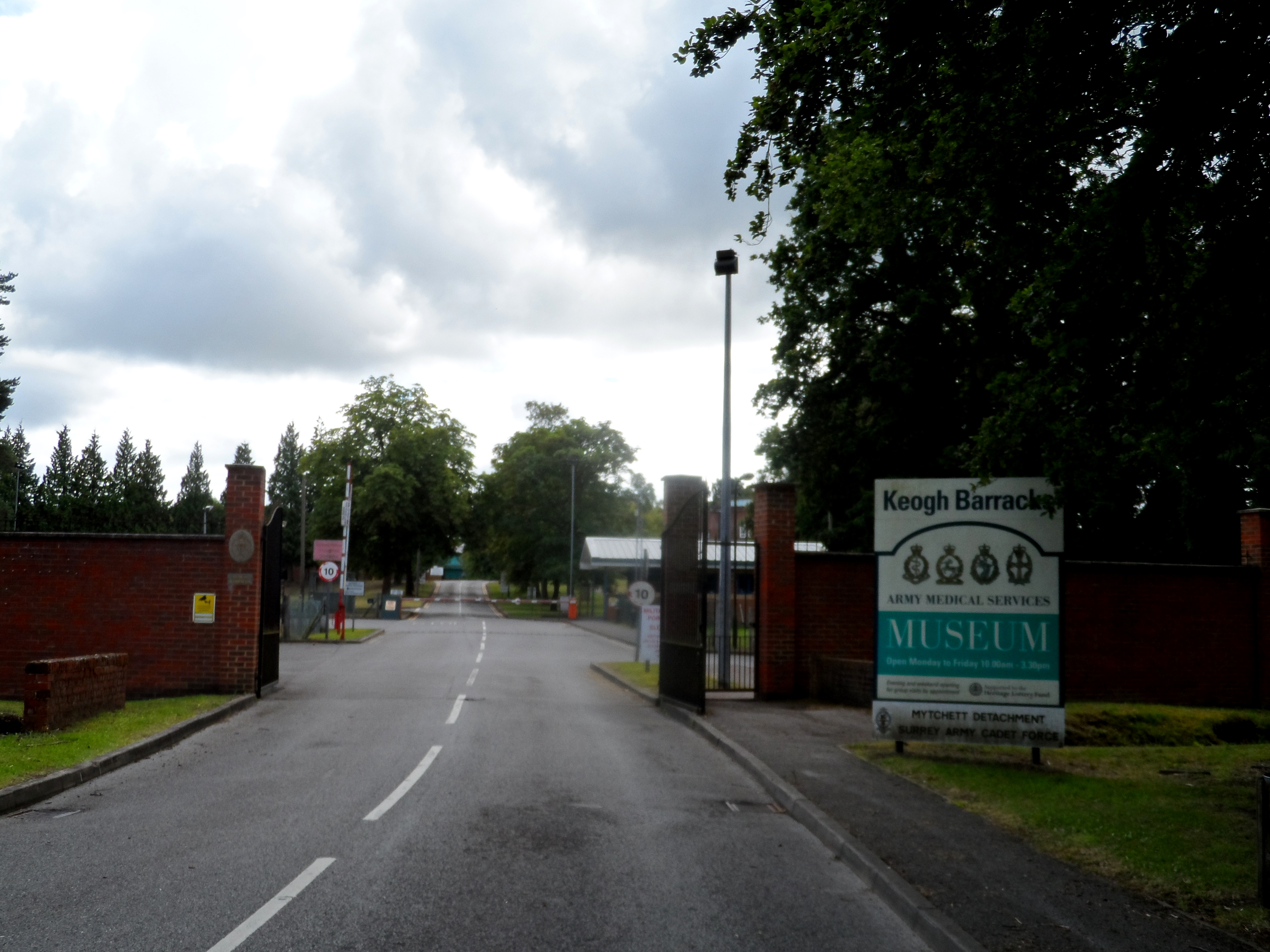
- Entrance to Keogh Barracks and Army Medical Services Museum

- Shown in Surrey
- Established: 1952
- Location: Keogh Barracks, Mytchett, Surrey
- Coordinates: 51.281°N 0.713°W
- Type: Regimental museum
- Website: museumofmilitarymedicine.org.uk

The Museum of Military Medicine, formerly the Army Medical Services Museum (AMS Museum), documents healthcare services in the British military over the past 200 years. The museum was based at Keogh Barracks, Mytchett, Surrey, from the early 1960s through to the mid-2020s. In 2025 the museum at Keogh Barracks closed, pending the opening of a new museum at DMS Whittington in Staffordshire.

== History ==
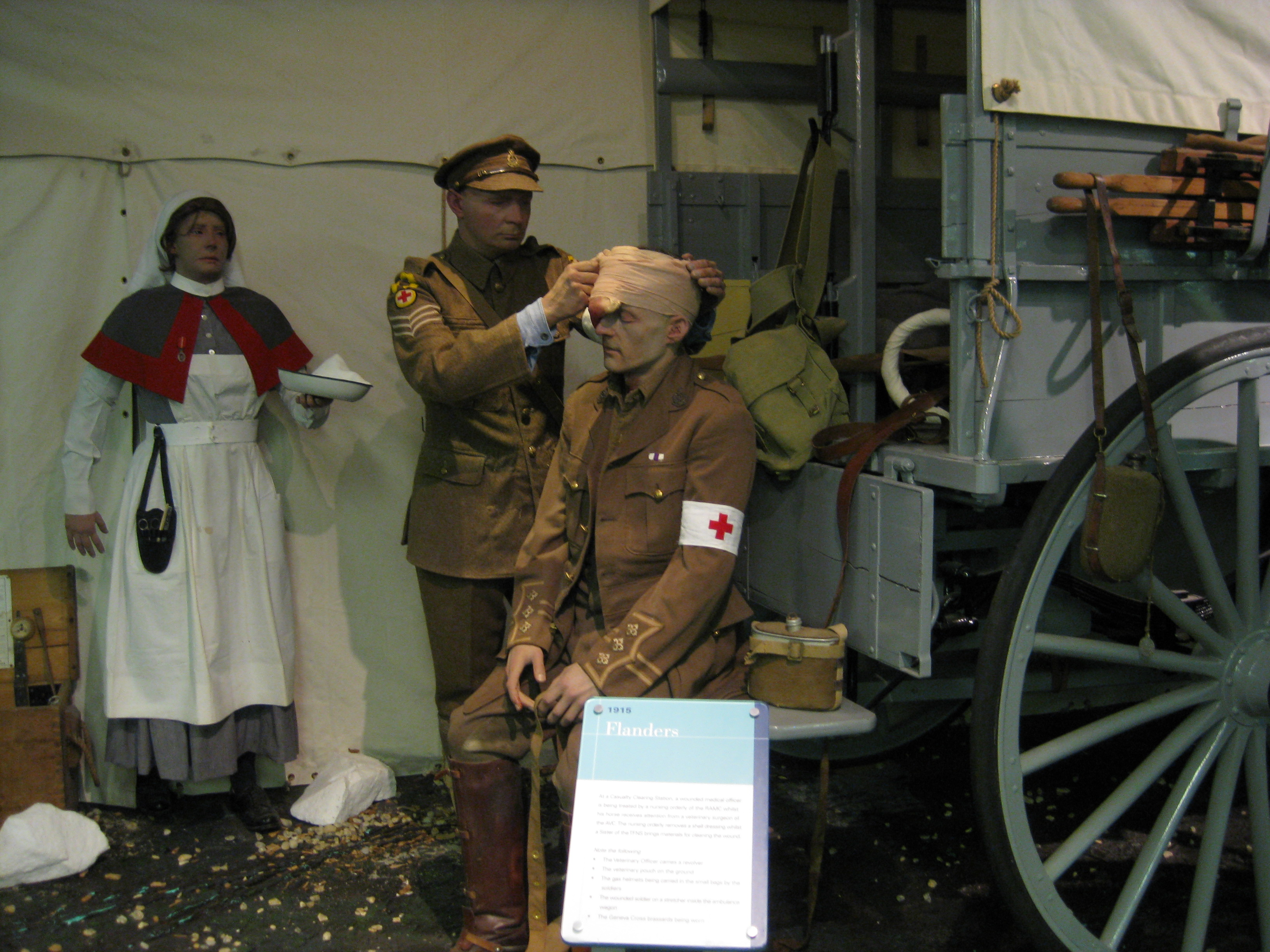
First World War casualty in a diorama at the Museum

The museum was established, as the Historical Museum of the Royal Army Medical Corps, at Queen Elizabeth Barracks, Church Crookham in 1952. In the following decade it moved (along with the RAMC training depot) to Keogh Barracks. The museum moved into a new building on the site in 1981. In 1984 the Royal Army Medical Corps Muniments Collection was transferred to the museum from the Royal Army Medical College in Millbank; it was subsequently placed on permanent loan with the Wellcome Collection, though a number of items were retained by the museum. The collection of the Queen Alexandra's Royal Army Nursing Corps Museum, previously based at the Royal Pavilion, Aldershot, moved to the site in 1994.

The museum changed its name from the Army Medical Services Museum to the Museum of Military Medicine in 2016.

In December 2020, plans were approved for the construction of a new 'Cardiff Museum of Military Medicine' in Cardiff, into which the museum would relocate; however the plan was not carried through. It was later announced that the museum at Keogh Barracks would close (on 2 August 2025), pending removal to a new home at Whittington Barracks (where it would be co-located with Defence Medical Services HQ and the Defence Medical Academy).

== The collection ==
The museum in Keogh Barracks housed the collections of the Royal Army Medical Corps (RAMC) and Queen Alexandra's Royal Army Nursing Corps (QARANC) the Royal Army Veterinary Corps (RAVC) and the Royal Army Dental Corps (RADC). The collections on display included uniforms and insignia, medical, dental and veterinary equipment, ambulances, an ambulance train ward coach and a large medal collection including 23 of the 29 Victoria Crosses awarded to the Army Medical Services. The collection also included Florence Nightingale's carriage that she used in the Crimea, adapted for carrying stretchers. The museum also included a shop.

The museum in Whittington Barracks is scheduled to have 'all new displays' on the following themes:

- Medicine, Science, and Technology
- Conflict and Medicine
- Medical Personnel and Care
- Rehabilitation

as well as focusing on 'the wider role of defence medicine in the National Health Service and humanitarian relief'.

The museum archives contain over 30,000 items, and have served as a centre for research into the history of military and civil medicine.
