= General Bradshaw =

General Bradshaw may refer to:

- Aaron Bradshaw Jr. (1894–1976), U.S. Army major general
- Adrian Bradshaw (born 1958), British Army general
- Richard Bradshaw (British Army officer) (1920–1999), British Army lieutenant general
- William Bradshaw (British Army officer) (1897−1966), British Army major general
