= Queen Elizabeth Barracks =

Queen Elizabeth Barracks may refer to:

- Queen Elizabeth Barracks, Church Crookham, Hampshire, England
- Queen Elizabeth Barracks, Suva, Fiji
- Queen Elizabeth Barracks, Strensall, North Yorkshire, England
