= Keogh Barracks =

Army barracks in Surrey, England

- Part of Aldershot Garrison
- Mytchett, Surrey in England
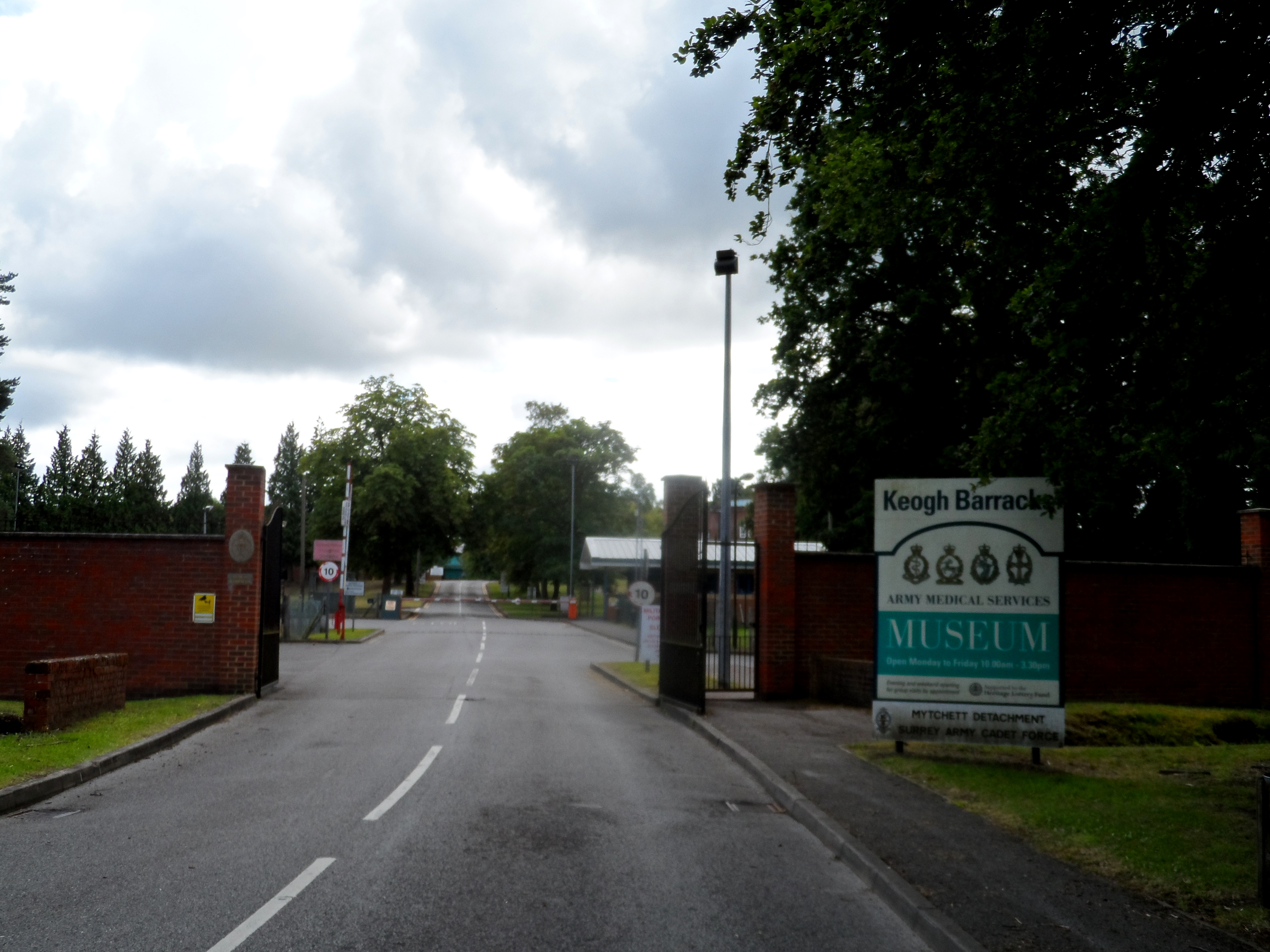
- Entrance to Keogh Barracks

Site information
- Type: Army barracks
- Owner: Ministry of Defence
- Operator: British Army
- Condition: Operational

Location
- Location within Surrey
- Coordinates: 51.2793°N 0.7176°W
- Area: 45 hectares (110 acres)

Site history
- Built: 1938
- Built for: War Office
- In use: 1938 – present

Garrison information
- Occupants: 2nd Battalion, Ranger Regiment

Keogh Barracks is a British Army installation on Mytchett Place Road, Mytchett, Surrey, England.

== History ==
The barracks were commissioned to accommodate the Army School of Hygiene and are named after Sir Alfred Keogh, a former Director-General of Army Medical Services. The foundation stone for the main building was laid by Lieutenant General Sir James Hartigan, Director-General of Army Medical Services, in February 1938. The Museum of Military Medicine has its origins in the "Mytchett Collection", a collection of documents accumulated there since 1952. In 1954, the RAMC Field Training Centre took over administration of the barracks. The depot of the Royal Army Medical Corps arrived from Queen Elizabeth Barracks, Church Crookham in 1964 and the Field Training Centre subsequently became known as the Royal Army Medical Corps Training Centre.

By the 1990s, the Royal Army Medical Corps Training Centre had changed its name to the Army Medical Services Training Group. The Army Medical Services Training Group amalgamated with the equivalent organizations in the Royal Navy and the Royal Air Force to form the Defence Medical Services Training Centre at Keogh Barracks in 1996. It moved to Whittington Barracks as the Defence College of Healthcare Education and Training in 2014.

A major refurbishment costing £50 million was carried out at Keogh Barracks in order to accommodate 4 Armoured Medical Regiment in 2015. In June 2015, 4 Med Regt moved into the barracks, relocating from nearby Normandy Barracks. 4 Med Regt later moved to Tidworth in July 2019, as part of the Army 2020 Refine programme.

By 2016, 22 Field Hospital were also based at Keogh Barracks. 22 Field Hospital was re-designated as 22 Multi-Role Medical Regiment in 2023, as part of the Future Soldier reforms. The regiment is the 'Vanguard’ medical regiment, held on high readiness to deploy at short notice worldwide. In July 2024, 22 Multi-Role Medical Regiment moved from Keogh Barracks to Dale Barracks near Chester.

The barracks is also home to the 2nd Battalion, Ranger Regiment, which was previously 2nd Battalion, The Princess of Wales's Royal Regiment. 2 RANGERS is a Special Operations battalion, operating in small teams, regionally aligned to East Africa.

== Current units ==
- 2nd Battalion, Ranger Regiment

== See also ==
- List of British Army installations
