= Huddlesford =

Village in Staffordshire, England

Coordinates: 52.6844°N 1.7766°W

- The Plough pub

- Location within Staffordshire
- Civil parish: Whittington
- District: Lichfield
- Shire county: Staffordshire
- Region: West Midlands
- Country: England
- Sovereign state: United Kingdom
- Police: Staffordshire
- Fire: Staffordshire
- Ambulance: West Midlands

Huddlesford is a village in the civil parish of Whittington, in the Lichfield district, in the English county of Staffordshire, 2 km east of the city of Lichfield. It is bisected by the Trent Valley Line (part of the West Coast Main Line). Most of the population live on narrowboats around Huddlesford canal junction.

== See also ==
- Listed buildings in Whittington, Staffordshire
