= Defence Medical Academy =

UK military training centre

- Active: 1996 – present
- Country: United Kingdom
- Branch: British Army; Royal Air Force; Royal Navy
- Type: Defence training centre
- Role: Medical training
- Part of: Defence Medical Services
- Location: DMS Whittington, Staffordshire

Commanders
- Current commander: Air Commodore Redman

The Defence Medical Academy is based at DMS Whittington. It is the training centre of Defence Medical Services. It trains military personnel to deal with situations that civilian paramedics would be involved with; i.e. more advanced situations than those which just require first aid.

== History ==
The organization was formed as the Defence Medical Services Training Centre from the medical training centres for the three services (Note: These units included the Army Medical Services Training Centre (previously known as the RAMC Training Centre) at Keogh Barracks and medical training teams at the Royal Hospital Haslar and the RAF Institute of Aviation Medicine) at Keogh Barracks in 1996 and was initially subordinate to the Defence Medical Training Organisation. It became subordinate to the Royal Centre for Defence Medicine in 2008 and moved to Whittington Barracks as the Defence College of Healthcare Education and Training in 2014. It was renamed the Defence Medical Academy in September 2019.

== Structure ==
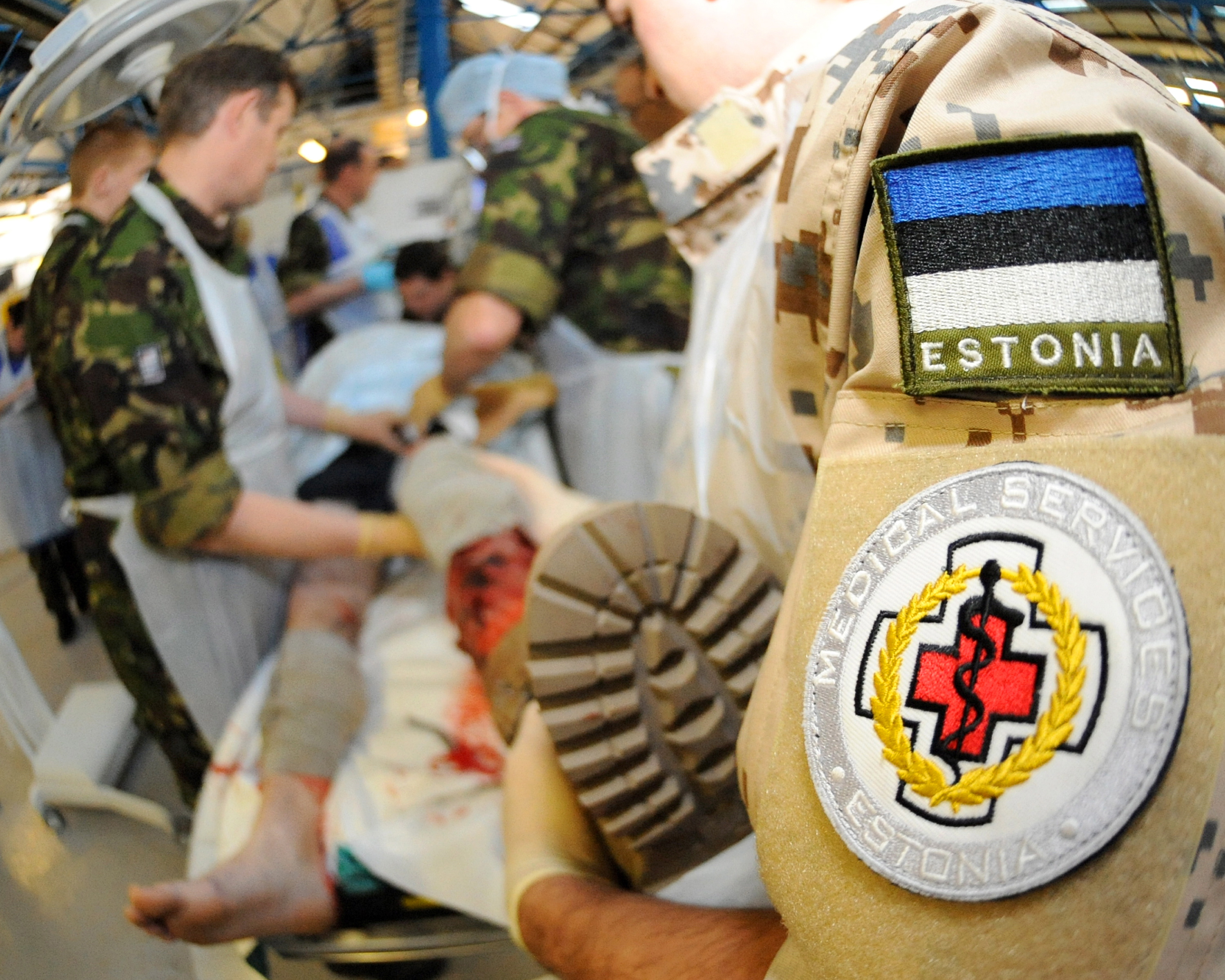
A member of the Estonian armed forces takes part in a training package designed to prepare for a deployment to Afghanistan with the UK Joint Force Medical Group.

The college is a Ministry of Defence Agency that provides Phase 2 training for medical personnel for all three armed forces (Combat Medical Technicians - CMTs and Medical Assistants - MAs), excluding that for medical doctors (from university medical schools). It trains the:

- Army Medical Services
- Royal Navy Medical Service
- RAF Medical Services

The Museum of Military Medicine is still based at Keogh Barracks.

== Commandants ==
=== Commandants of the Royal Army Medical Corps Training Centre ===
- Brigadier Desmond Murphy (1970 to 1973)
- Brigadier Richard Bradshaw (1973 to 1975)
- Colonel Geoffrey Banks (c.1985 to c.1988)

=== Commandant Defence Medical Academy ===
- Surgeon Commodore Elizabeth Crowson (ca 2022 – March 2026)
- Air Commodore E. L. Redman (March 2026)

== See also ==
- Royal Centre for Defence Medicine in Birmingham
- Medical Supplies Agency, based at Ludgershall, Wiltshire
- Defence School of Health Care Studies - trains nurses
