= DMS Whittington =

Barracks in Whittington, Staffordshire, England

- Near Whittington, Staffordshire in England
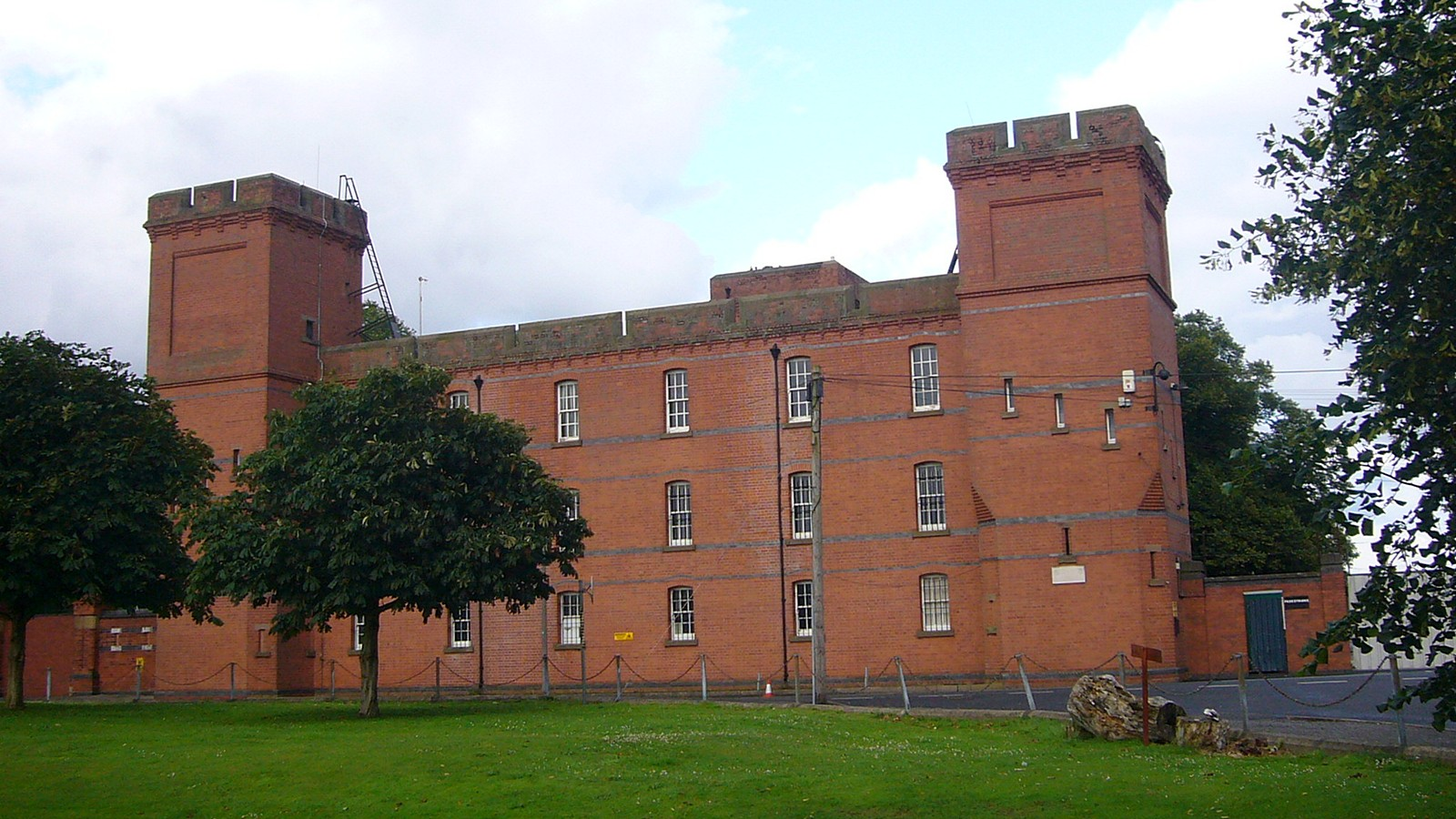
- The keep at DMS Whittington, a grade II listed building

Site information
- Type: Joint military installation
- Owner: Ministry of Defence
- Operator: Cyber & Specialist Operations Command
- Controlled by: Defence Medical Services
- Open to the public: Access to Staffordshire Regiment Museum only
- Condition: Operational

Location
- Location within Staffordshire
- Coordinates: 52°39′32″N 01°46′23″W
- Area: 62 hectares (150 acres)

Site history
- Built: 1881 (as Whittington Barracks)
- Built for: War Office
- In use: 2008 – present (as DMS Whittington)

Garrison information
- Garrison: HQ Mercian Regiment
- Occupants: Defence Medical Academy; Surgeon General

DMS Whittington, otherwise known as Defence Medical Services Whittington (formerly Whittington Barracks), is a military base in Whittington, Staffordshire, near Lichfield in England. It is home to the Staffordshire Regiment Museum, the Headquarters of the Surgeon General and subordinate medical headquarters, and the location of the Defence Medical Academy.

== Early history ==
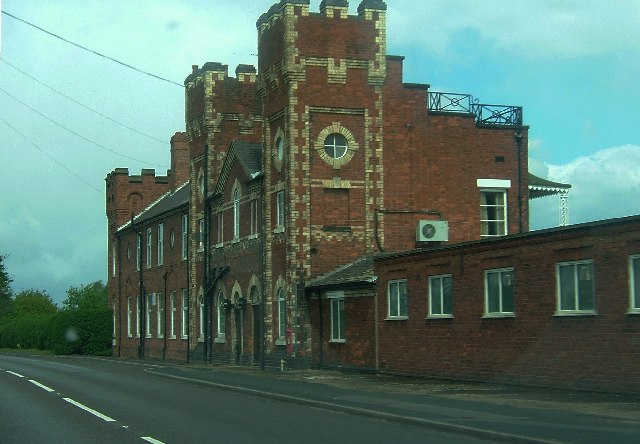
Whittington Heath Golf Club (formerly a grandstand for the racecourse)

The barracks were constructed on Whittington Heath. The heath had been the site of the Lichfield races which had moved from Fradley in 1702. During the 18th century they were one of the largest and well attended race meetings in the Midlands and in 1773 a grandstand was erected near the Lichfield-Tamworth Road. However, during the 19th century the popularity of the races dwindled, and military use of the heath grew. The War Office approached the Marquess of Anglesey in 1875 to buy the heath for the building of a barracks. Construction started in 1877 and the formal handing over of the newly built barracks to the military was recorded in 1881. Their creation took place as part of the Cardwell Reforms which encouraged the localisation of British military forces.

The barracks were intended to be the depot of the 38th (1st Staffordshire) Regiment of Foot and 80th Regiment of Foot (Staffordshire Volunteers). Under the Childers Reforms these regiments amalgamated to form the South Staffordshire Regiment with its depot at the barracks in 1881. They were also intended to be the depot of the 64th (2nd Staffordshire) Regiment of Foot and the 98th (Prince of Wales's) Regiment of Foot which under the same reforms amalgamated to form the North Staffordshire Regiment also in 1881.

In 1895 the last race meeting was held after the War Office declared it was "undesirable to hold a race meeting at the gate of the barracks." The Lichfield races are remembered in the names of pubs in Freeford called the Horse & Jockey and in Lichfield, The Scales which was where jockeys were "weighed in". The old grandstand became a soldiers home before it was purchased in 1957 by Whittington Heath Golf Course as its clubhouse.

== Second World War: 10th Replacement Depot ==
During the Second World War the barracks was occupied by the United States Army and in August 1942 was designated as the 10th US Army Replacement Depot. Replacement depots, known by troops as "repple depples", temporarily housed reserves or replacements for front-line formations, including soldiers who had been discharged from medical care for return to active service. The depot was also used as a military prison. Under the command of Lieutenant Colonel James A. Kilian, a native of Highland Park, Illinois, and Major Richard E. Lobuono, the Provost Marshal, the depot became "infamous" for its regime of brutality and the "cruel and unusual punishments of American soldiers imprisoned there." Prisoners were beaten with clubs, forced to carry out vigorous physical exercise for seven hours daily, and given only five minutes to eat meals. When notice was received of official inspections by visiting officers, prisoners thought likely to make complaints or with visible injuries were temporarily removed from the camp.

In 1946 a court martial was convened at Grosvenor Square, London, to inquire into allegations that nine guards and two officers had ill-treated prisoners at Whittington. The court martial took ten months to reach its conclusion and grew to include Kilian and Lobuono. Sergeant Judson Smith was sentenced to three years hard labour and a dishonorable discharge and other enlisted men received prison sentences of lesser length. Lieutenant Granville Cubage, accused of ordering the punishments, pleaded that he was following orders from superior officers; he was fined $250 and reprimanded. In September 1946, at a court martial convened at Bad Nauheim, Germany, Lobuono was officially reprimanded and fined $250 (approximately one month's pay), and Kilian was reprimanded and fined $500.

== Post war ==
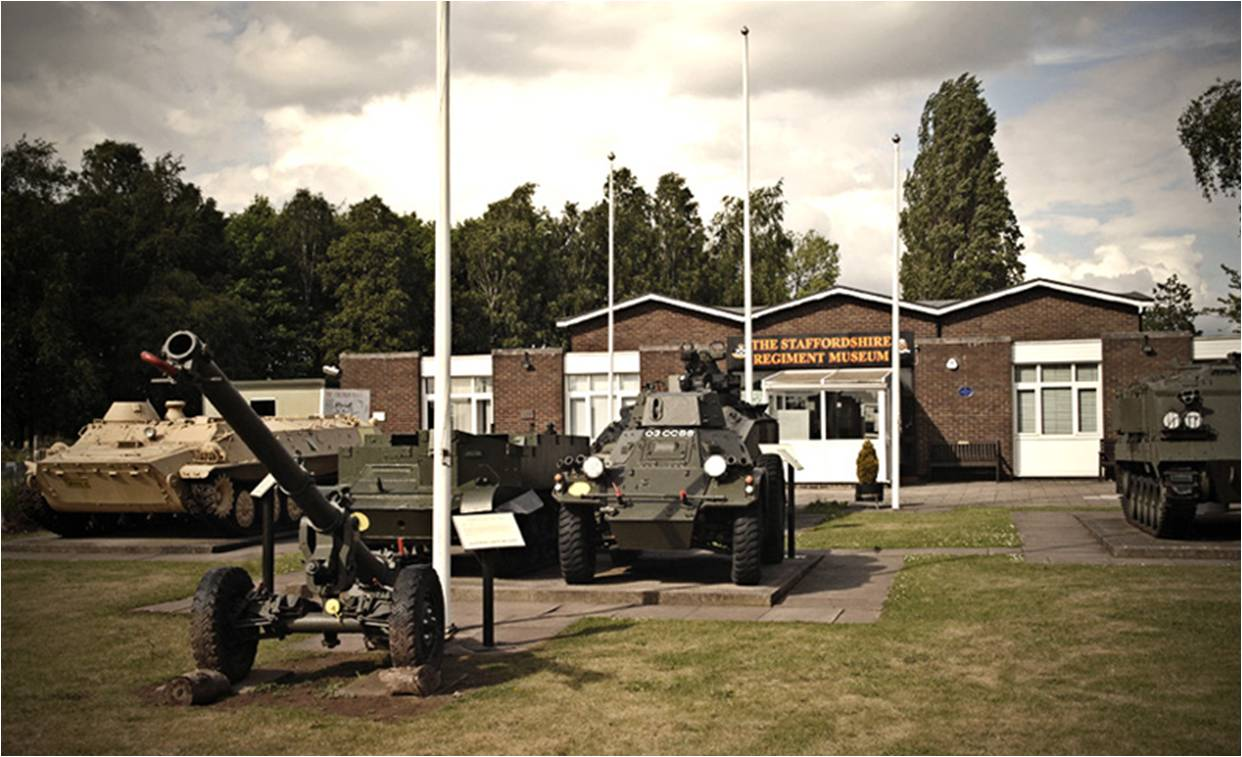
The Staffordshire Regiment Museum

The barracks, which went on to become the regional centre for infantry training as the Mercian Brigade Depot in 1960, also became home to the Staffordshire Regiment Museum in 1963 and the depot of the Prince of Wales' Division in 1968.

The barracks remained the home of the Army Training Regiment, Lichfield, which trained new recruits on their Phase 1 Common Military Training (i.e. becoming soldiers) from the Royal Signals and Royal Engineers, from 2002 until 2008 when Major General Andrew Farquhar CBE, General Officer Commanding the Army's 5th Infantry Division, inspected the recruits and took the salute before the Army Training Regiment's flag was lowered for the last time.

In 2007 Whittington Barracks became the Regimental Headquarters of the newly formed Mercian Regiment.

In July 2008 the Labour Government set in motion the centralisation of all planning and training of the Defence Medical Services at Whittington Barracks. The relocation of the Headquarters of the Surgeon-General and major components of the Joint Medical Command (JMC) was completed. A new HQ, named Coltman House, has been built and is fully occupied. Alongside the Headquarters of the Surgeon-General, the elements of the JMC now at Whittington comprise the defence medical group and the JMC HQ previously at Fort Blockhouse, Gosport, Hampshire, the Director of Healthcare previously based in Whitehall, the Defence Dental Service previously located at RAF Halton, Buckinghamshire, and the Defence Postgraduate Medical Dean, previously located in Birmingham at the Royal Centre for Defence Medicine at Selly Oak Hospital. The single service medical heads, the Army Medical Services, Royal Navy Medical Branch and Royal Air Force Medical Branch. A second phase at the barracks – now renamed Defence Medical Services Whittington – include new training facilities, a new learning centre, a new lecture theatre, new messes for officers, warrant officers and NCOs – and a new junior ranks dining and leisure facility.

In 2014 the Duchess of Cornwall visited the site to commemorate the relocation of the Defence Medical Services Training Group from Keogh Barracks, Mytchett, Surrey, to Whittington Barracks.

Grade II listed buildings at the barracks are: the keep, the garrison church and the separate World War I war memorials to the North and South Staffordshire Regiments.

== Based units ==
The current units stationed at DMS Whittington include:

=== Cyber & Specialist Operations Command ===
Defence Medical Services

- Defence Medical Academy
- Defence Dental Service
- Headquarters, Surgeon-General

=== British Army ===
Infantry

- Queens Division
  - Mercian Regiment
    - Regimental Headquarters

=== Ministry of Defence ===
- Headquarters, Defence Infrastructure Organisation

== See also ==
- List of British Army installations
- Listed buildings in Whittington, Staffordshire
