= Samuel Lipscomb Seckham =

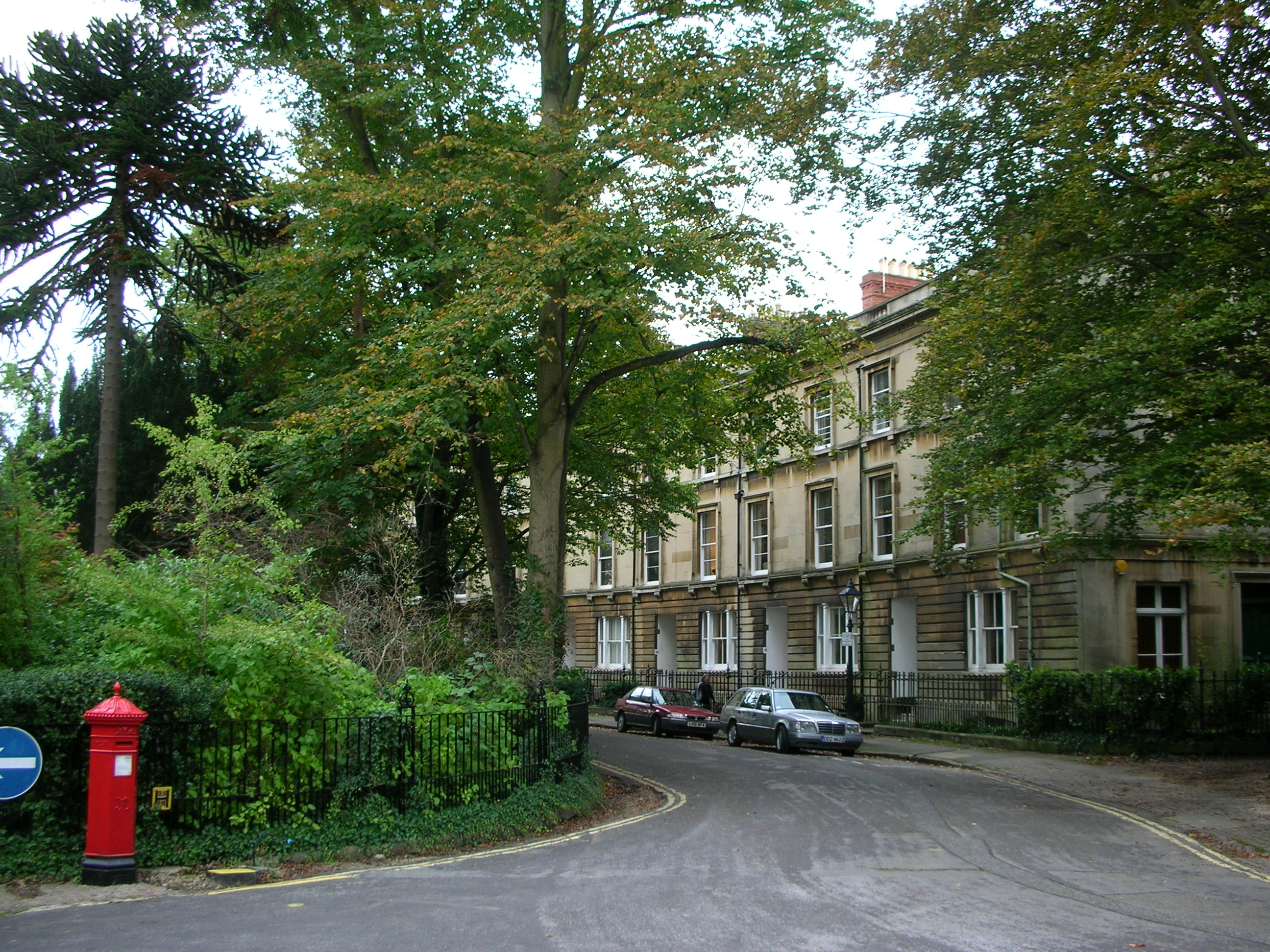
The main crescent of Park Town, Oxford, built in 1853–54 to designs by Seckham.

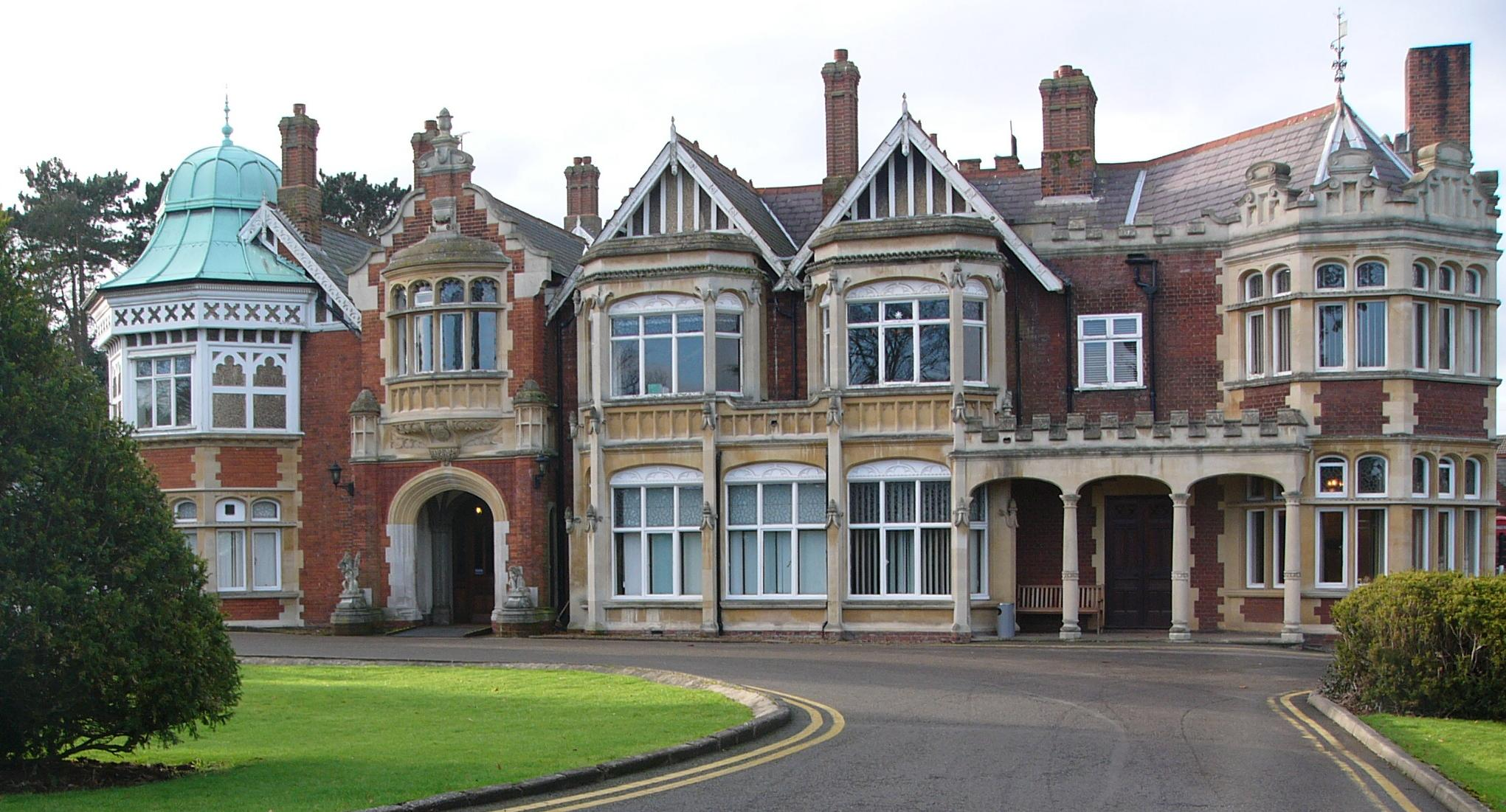
The main house at Bletchley Park. The estate was bought in 1877 and later developed by Seckham.

Samuel Lipscomb Seckham (Oxford 25 October 1827 – 4 February 1901) was an English Victorian architect, developer, magistrate and brewer.

He was born in Oxford, and later became the City Surveyor. He was the original architect employed by St John's College, Oxford to develop parts of North Oxford. He developed Park Town, an early and prominent estate in North Oxford. Through Seckham's efforts, the Park Town Estate Company was formed in September 1857. Such was the success of Park Town, he also worked on plans for Walton Manor and Norham Manor.

Seckham developed Bletchley Park, which he purchased in 1877 and sold in 1883 to Sir Herbert Samuel Leon (1850–1926), a financier and Liberal MP. Bletchley Park later became famous for the World War II codebreaking effort there.

In 1889, Seckham purchased and occupied Whittington Old Hall, a 16th-century mansion house at Whittington near Lichfield in Staffordshire. He became High Sheriff of Staffordshire in 1890. He also held the office of Deputy Lieutenant (DL).

Seckham married Kinbarra Sweene Smith and had a daughter Kinbarra Swene Seckham. There is memorial panelling for Seckham in St Giles Church at Whittington.
