= Defence Dental Service =

Dental services provider to the British Armed Forces

Defence Dental Services (DDS) is a tri-service dental services provider to the British Armed Forces.

The service forms part of the MoD Defence Medical Services branch and employs approximately 9,100 personnel drawn from the Royal Navy, British Army and Royal Air Force as well as civilian staff. The service is headquartered at DMS Whittington, near Lichfield in Staffordshire. DDS controls 12 regional headquarters, each headed by a Principle Dental Officer and provides dental services to personnel on active operations throughout the world.

The Defence Dental Services organisation was established on 1 April 2005, replacing the Defence Dental Agency (DDA). Prior to 1996 dental services had been separately managed by the Royal Naval Dental Service (established in 1920), the Royal Army Dental Corps (established in 1921) and the RAF Dental Branch (established in 1930). On 1 March 1996 the three dental service headquarters were combined to form the DDA. The three branches continue to maintain their individual service identities, but as part of a single, tri-service command structure.
