= Whittington Old Hall =

Country house in Staffordshire, England

Coordinates: 52.6715°N 1.7614°W

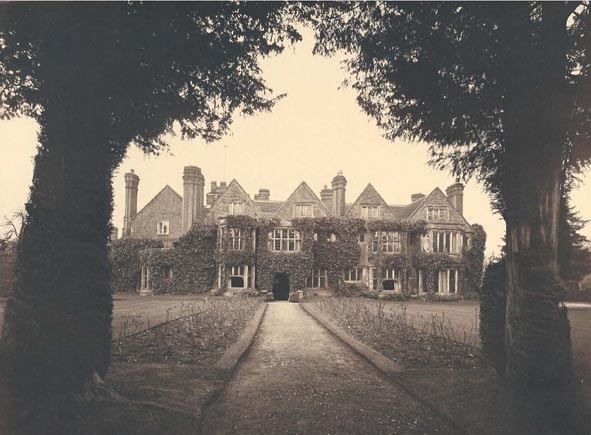
Whittington Old Hall c.1900

Whittington Old Hall is a 16th-century mansion house at Whittington, Staffordshire, England, which has been subdivided into separate residential apartments. It is a Grade II* listed building.

The house is believed to have been built by the Everard family during the Tudor period. The two-storey entrance front has four gables with dormers and four substantial irregular stone mullioned bays, one offset incorporating a porch.

The Astleys and the Dyotts followed as owners but after the Dyott family moved to nearby Freeford Hall, in 1836, the house was let out to a series of tenants. In 1889, the estate was purchased and occupied by architect and brewer Samuel Lipscomb Seckham, developer of Park Town, Oxford and Bletchley Park, and High Sheriff of Staffordshire in 1890.

Seckham extended and renovated the house, but following the death of his son Colonel Basset Thorne Seckham in 1926, the estate was sold off, and the house again passed through the hands of tenants.

In 1959, the neglected property was sold for redevelopment and was subdivided into several separate residential units.

== See also ==
- Grade II* listed buildings in Lichfield (district)
- Listed buildings in Whittington, Staffordshire
