= Listed buildings in Whittington, Staffordshire =

Whittington is a civil parish in the district of Lichfield, Staffordshire, England. It contains 19 buildings that are recorded in the National Heritage List for England. Of these, one is listed at Grade II*, the middle of the three grades, and the others are at Grade II, the lowest grade. The parish contains the villages of Whittington and Huddlesford and the surrounding countryside. Most of the listed buildings are houses and associated structures, cottages, farmhouses and farm buildings. In the parish is Whittington Barracks, and the listed buildings here are the keep, a garrison church, and two war memorials. The Coventry Canal and the Birmingham and Fazeley Canal pass through the parish, and a bridge over each of these is listed. The other listed buildings are a church, a memorial in the churchyard, a former school, and another war memorial.

== Key ==
Grade	Criteria
II*	Particularly important buildings of more than special interest
II	Buildings of national importance and special interest

== Buildings ==
Name and location	Photograph	Date	Notes	Grade
St Giles' Church; 52.67242°N 1.76762°W		14th century (probable	The oldest part of the church is the tower, most of the building dates from 1761, and the chancel was added in 1881 by Ewan Christian. The nave is built in red brick, the rest of the church in stone, and the roof is slated. The church consists of a nave, a chancel, and a west steeple, the tower embraced by the nave. The tower has a vestry projection to the south, a stair projection to the north, two stages, a west doorway with a segmental head, a north clock face, a string course, an embattled parapet, and a recessed spire.	II
Tudor Cottage, The Green; 52.67297°N 1.76074°W	—	17th century	The house was altered and extended in the 18th and 19th centuries. The original part is timber framed, and the rebuilding and extensions are in brick. There is one storey and an attic, and an L-shaped plan, consisting of the original range with two bays, and two extensions, one at right angles. On the front is a gabled porch, the windows are casements with segmental heads, there are gabled dormers and large garage doors.	II
Whittington Old Hall; 52.67156°N 1.76137°W	—	17th century	A large house that was considerably extended in 1891, it is in red brick with sandstone dressings and quoins, and a tile roof. There are two storeys and an attic, and a roughly L-shaped plan, consisting of a main range with four gabled bays, and a wing at right angles, and later extensions including an extension to the wing, a tower in the angle, and a further extension to the main range. On the front are three two-storey canted bay windows and a two-storey porch. The porch has a moulded semicircular arch with engaged fluted columns. The tower has three storeys, a moulded string course, and an embattled parapet. Most of the windows are mullioned or mullioned and transomed.	II*
Gate piers and wall, Whittington Old Hall; 52.67143°N 1.76259°W	—	1673	The gate piers flank a former entrance to the hall, which is now blocked, they are square, in stone, and rusticated. Each pier has a frieze with an oval panel, one is dated, the other inscribed, and a cap with a projecting cornice and the base of a former finial. To the west of the piers is a red brick wall with stone coping that runs for about 20 yards (18 m).	II
Blue Gates Farmhouse; 52.69973°N 1.76297°W	—	c. 1700	The farmhouse is in plastered brick, with a storey band and a tile roof. There is one storey and an attic, a main range of two bays, a one-bay rear wing, and a rear outshut. The central doorway has a tiled canopy, and the windows are casements.	II
Whittington House and Elswick House; 52.67125°N 1.76307°W	—	Early 18th century	A house and service wing that was divided, the service wing becoming Elswick House, to which an extension was later added. The building is in red brick with a coped parapet ramped down at the ends, and a tile roof with coped verges. Whittington House has two storeys and an attic, and five bays, and Elswick House has two storeys, and a projecting two-storey extension with a dentilled eaves band. The windows are sashes with segmental heads, and in the centre of Whittington House is a doorway with a bracketed cornice hood.	II
Former stables northwest of Elswick House; 52.67142°N 1.76320°W	—	Early to mid 18th century	The stables, later used for other purposes, are in red brick with dentilled eaves and a tile roof. There is one storey and an attic, and three bays. The building contains doors, one with a segmental head, a casement window, a gabled dormer, and in the north gable end is a loft opening.	II
Barn and granary, Blue Gates Farm; 52.69987°N 1.76287°W	—	18th century	The barn and granary are in red brick with an eaves band and a tile roof. There is one storey, the barn has three bays, and the granary has one. In the barn are full-height barn doors and air vents, and at the right gable end external steps lead up to a loft door with a segmental head.	II
Huddlesford Grange; 52.68268°N 1.77313°W	—	18th century	A red brick farmhouse with a storey band, a dentilled eaves band, and a tile roof. There are two storeys and an attic, and a T-shaped plan, with a main range of five bays, and a rear wing. On the front is a segmental-headed doorway, and a canted bay window. Most of the windows are sashes with segmental heads, there is a casement window, two blind windows, and three flat-roofed dormers. On the left gable end is a gabled porch.	II
Whittington Lodge, The Green; 52.67301°N 1.76129°W	—	Mid 18th century	A red brick house with a double eaves band and a tile roof. There are three storeys and three bays. The windows are casements with segmental heads.	II
Astley and Norton memorial 52.67249°N 1.76757°W	—	Late 18th century	The memorial is in the churchyard of St Giles' Church, and is to the memory of members of the Astley and Norton families. It is a chest tomb in stone with a rectangular plan. The tomb has a moulded base and cap, pilasters on each corner with gadrooned bases, three inscription panels on each side, and a coat of arms at the north end.	II
Swan Bridge; 52.67774°N 1.76251°W		c. 1785	The bridge carries Burton Road over the Coventry Canal. It is in red brick with a stone parapet, and consists of a single segmental arch. There are square end piers.	II
Church Farmhouse, Church Street; 52.67301°N 1.76941°W	—	Early 19th century	The farmhouse is in red brick with a tile roof. It has three storeys, a front of three bays, and two parallel rear wings. The central doorway has a rectangular fanlight, and the windows are sashes with wedge lintels and raised keystones.	II
Old School, Main Street; 52.67217°N 1.76373°W	—	1864	The former school is in red brick with blue brick diapering and a tile roof with coped gables. It is in Gothic style, and the plan consists of two schoolrooms at right angles. The doorway has a chamfered surround incorporating an inscribed stone. The windows vary; they include mullioned and transomed windows, and casements.	II
Garrison Church of St George; 52.65934°N 1.77204°W	—	1881	The church is within Whittington Barracks. It is built in red brick with some stone, and has a slate roof. The church is in Early English style, and has a cruciform plan, consisting of a nave, north and south transepts, a north vestry and office, a south chaplain's office, and a chancel. On the roof is a bellcote, and wheel crosses on the gables. Some of the windows are circular, and most are lancets.	II
Keep, Whittington Barracks; 52.66033°N 1.77583°W	—	1881	The double keep is at the entrance to the barracks. It is in red brick with some blue brick, and a flat roof. The building consists of a main block with three storeys and a basement, and six bays, with three taller turrets, one at the rear, and two protruding at the sides of the front. The turrets have recessed panels, stepped corbels, and embattled parapets, and contain loop windows. The main block contains sash windows with cambered heads. The perimeter wall is in red brick with blue brick coping, and on the inside is a firing platform.	II
North Staffordshire Regimental War Memorial; 52.65963°N 1.77515°W	—	1922	The war memorial is in Whittington Barracks, and is in Portland stone. It consists of a square plinth with three steps, a pedestal, and a slightly tapering Doric column surmounted by a bronze Chinese dragon. On the plinth are panels with regimental insignia, inscriptions relating to the history of the regiment, and the names of those lost in the conflicts.	II
South Staffordshire Regimental War Memorial; 52.65979°N 1.77495°W	—	1922	The war memorial is in Whittington Barracks, and is in Portland stone. It consists of a square plinth with three steps, a pedestal, and a square column with a groove in each face, surmounted by a three-stepped pyramid and a bronze sphinx. On the plinth are panels with regimental insignia, inscriptions relating to the history of the regiment, and the names of those lost in the conflicts.	II
Whittington War Memorial; 52.67192°N 1.76393°W		1924	The war memorial is at a road junction and is in granite. It consists of a Cross pattée on a tapering plinth with a square base. On the cross head is a Latin cross carved in relief. On the front of the plinth is an inscription and the names of the scholars from Whittington School who were lost in the First World War, and on the front of the base is another inscriptions and the names of the men of the village who were lost in the Second World War. In front of the memorial are railings and a gate.	II
