= Aldershot Military Museum =

Military museum in Aldershot in England

Coordinates: 51.26963°N 0.75063°W

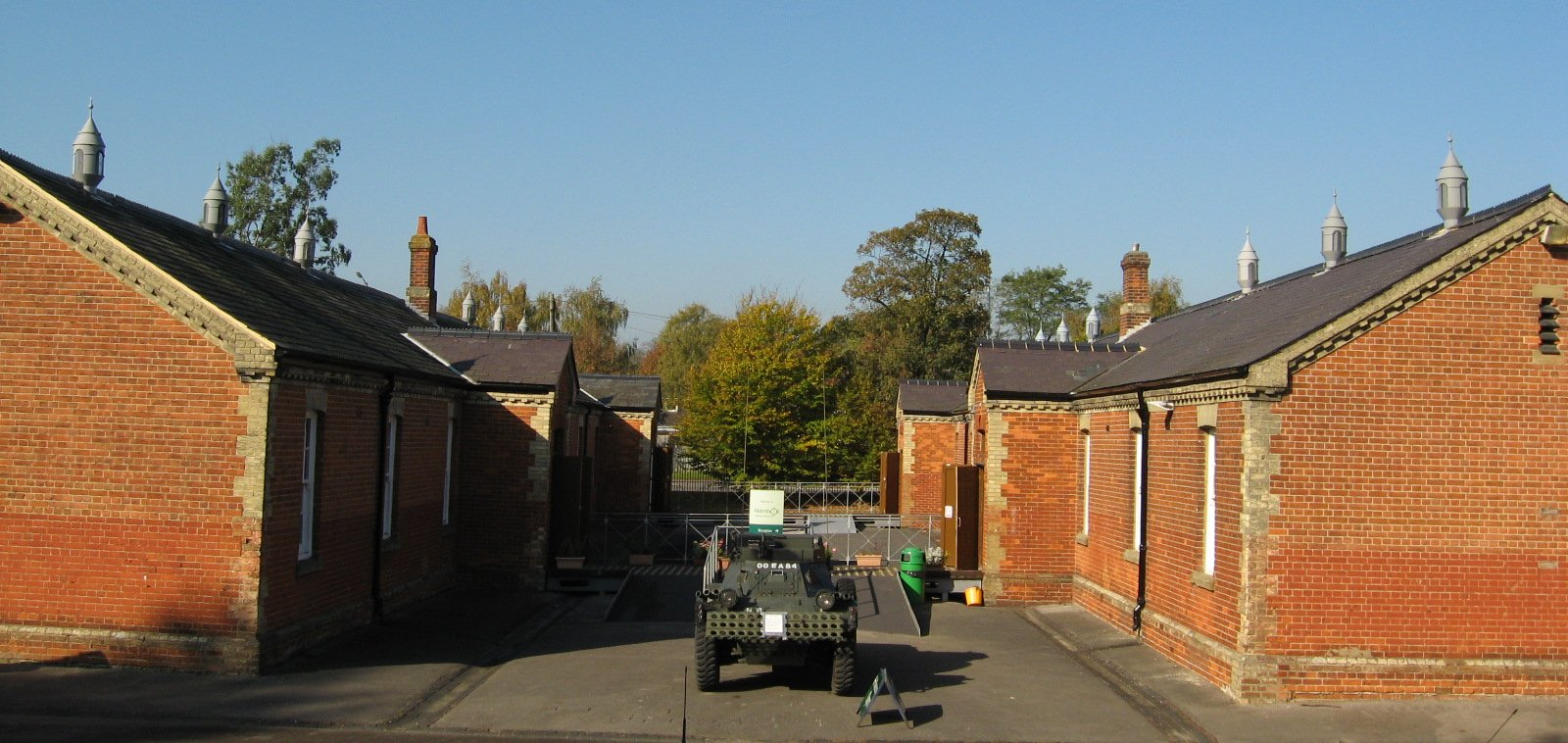
Aldershot Military Museum

Aldershot Military Museum in Aldershot Military Town in Hampshire, England, was conceived by former Aldershot Garrison commander Brigadier John Reed (1926–1992). Reed believed that it was essential to preserve the history of the military town and founded the Aldershot Military Historical Trust to raise funds for the establishment of the museum. Reed acquired the two Victorian barrack bungalows in which the museum is still based.

The museum was opened by the Duke of Gloucester in 1984 and is housed in the only two surviving barrack bungalows built in the "North Camp" area of Farnborough in the 1890s. The museum tells the story of the British Army in Aldershot, the "Home of the British Army", from the Army's arrival in the area in the 1850s to the present day. It also acts as the local history museum for the civil towns of Aldershot and Farnborough, which form the modern Borough of Rushmoor.

In 2014, ownership of the Aldershot Military Museum was transferred to the Hampshire Cultural Trust as part of a larger transfer of museums from Hampshire County Council and Winchester City Council. The M and N Block barrack buildings date to 1894 and are Grade II listed buildings as they are the only surviving examples of their type.

== Galleries ==
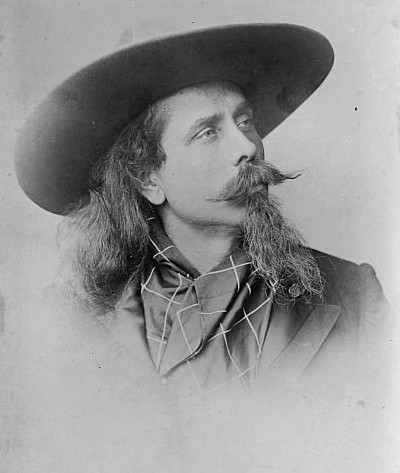
Samuel Franklin Cody has a gallery in the museum

The museum's military gallery tells the story of the Military Town of Aldershot from 1854 to the present day, including the development of the early military camp, through to Aldershot Command and the current Aldershot Garrison. The gallery was completely refurbished in 2001, funded by a grant from the Heritage Lottery Fund, and at that time was renamed the John Reed Gallery in memory of the museum's founder.

The Montgomery Gallery building once stood in the grounds of Field Marshal Montgomery's home at Isington near Alton, Hampshire. It was built for him in 1947 to house his wartime caravans and was moved to the museum in 1995; it houses part of the museum's collection of larger exhibits of field guns and other vehicles, including tanks and armoured cars.

The Rushmoor Local History Gallery tells the story of Aldershot and Farnborough, and the people and businesses associated with those towns. In this gallery are displays about George Potters, drum makers to the British Army; a Victorian shop; and information on the French imperial family, the construction of Farnborough Abbey and the pottery industry of Farnborough and Cove.

In 1908, Farnborough was the site of Britain's first powered flight by the American, Samuel Franklin Cody. The Cody Gallery includes a reconstruction of part of Cody's Farnborough workshop, and displays artefacts such as his flying helmet.

== The Boyce Building ==
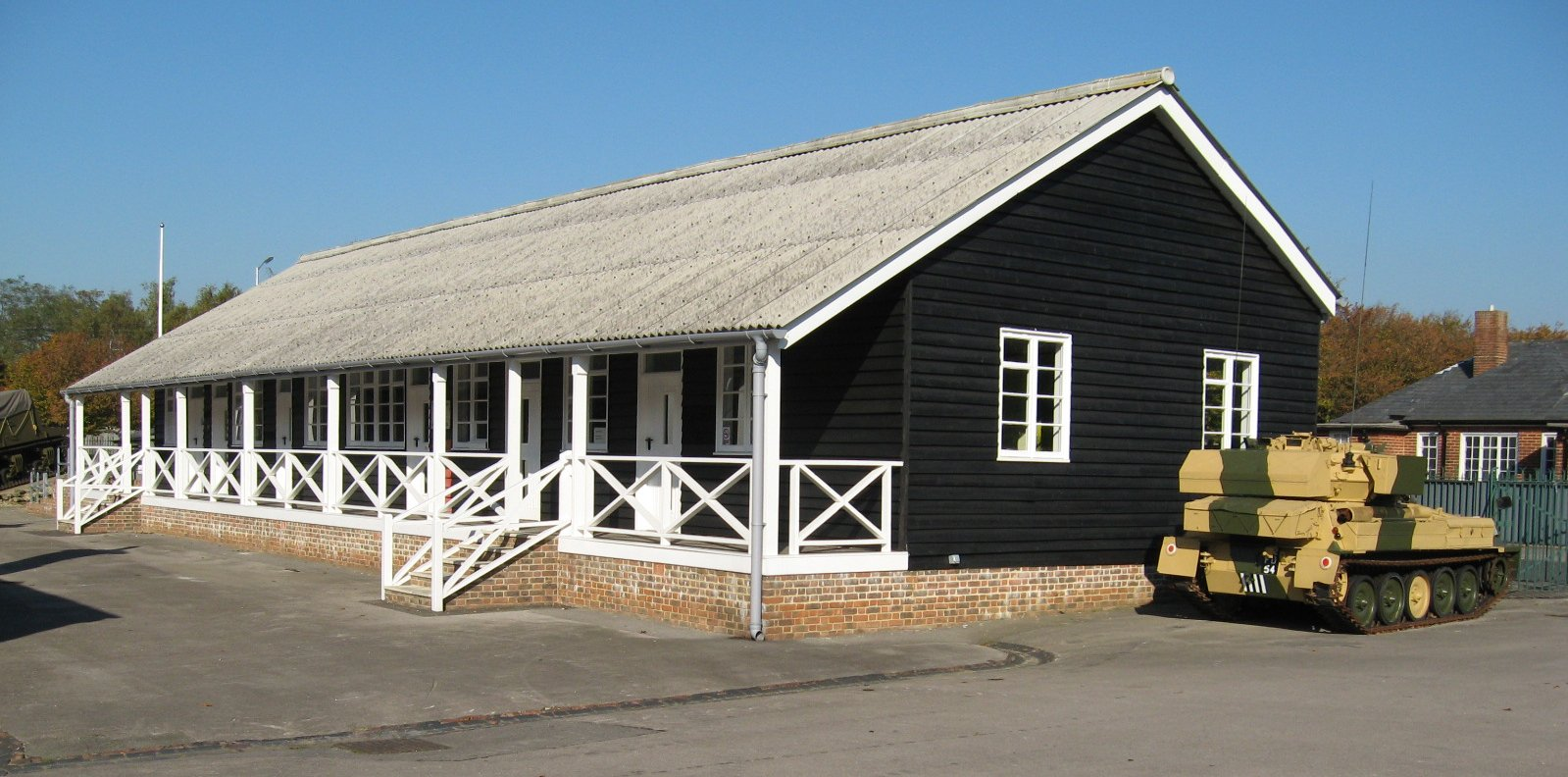
The Boyce Building

Officially opened in November 2006, this 1930s wooden barrack block came from Queen Elizabeth Barracks, Church Crookham, and was once the home of the Regimental Administration Offices for the camp.

Carefully reconstructed at the museum thanks to a £50,000 Heritage Lottery grant, the Boyce Gallery explores the users of the barracks which was once home to the Royal Army Service Corps, Royal Army Medical Corps, Royal Corps of Transport and many battalions from the Brigade of Gurkhas before closing in 2000.

== Gallery ==
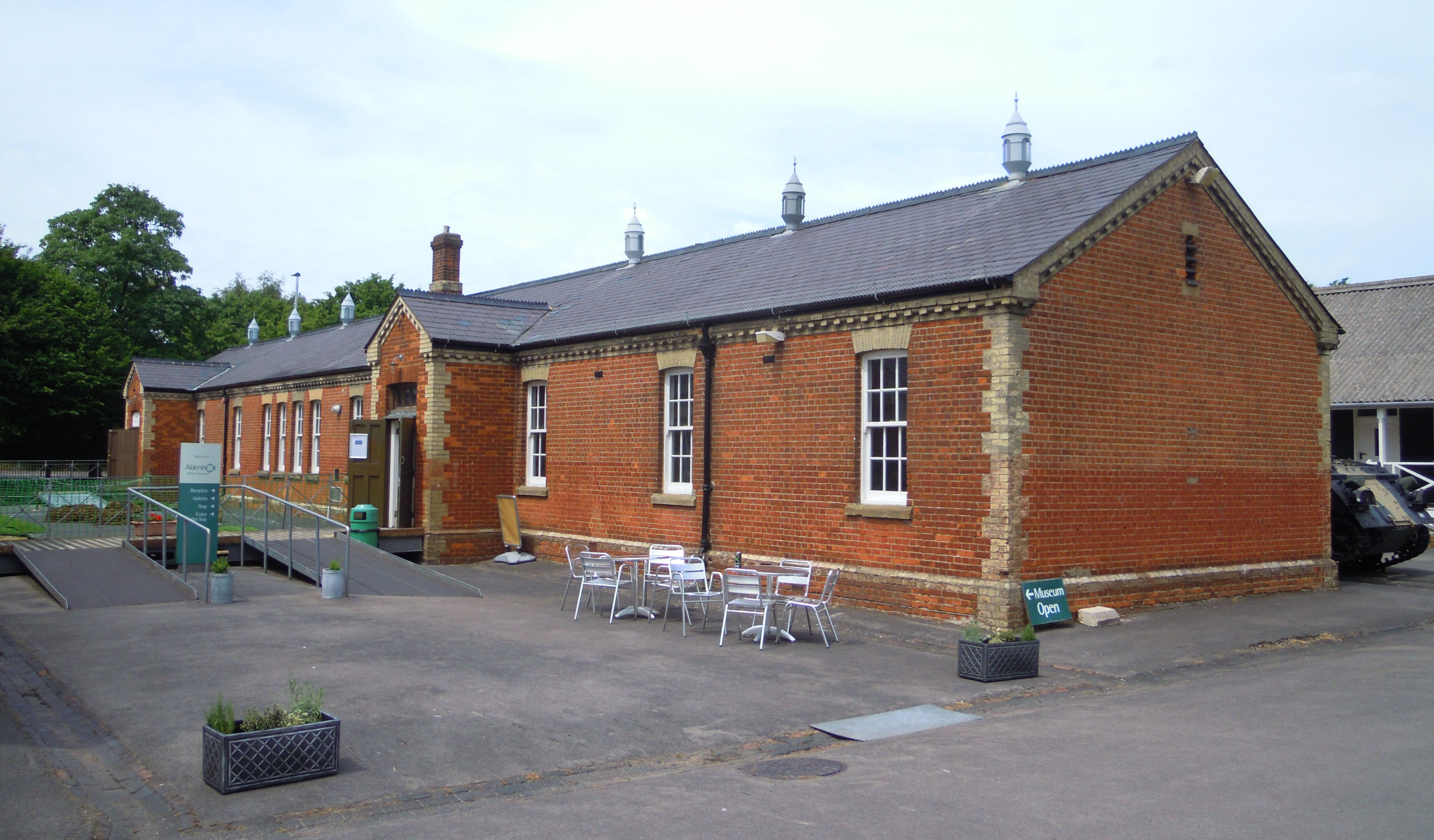
The N Block barracks of 1894 are Grade II listed buildings and house the museum

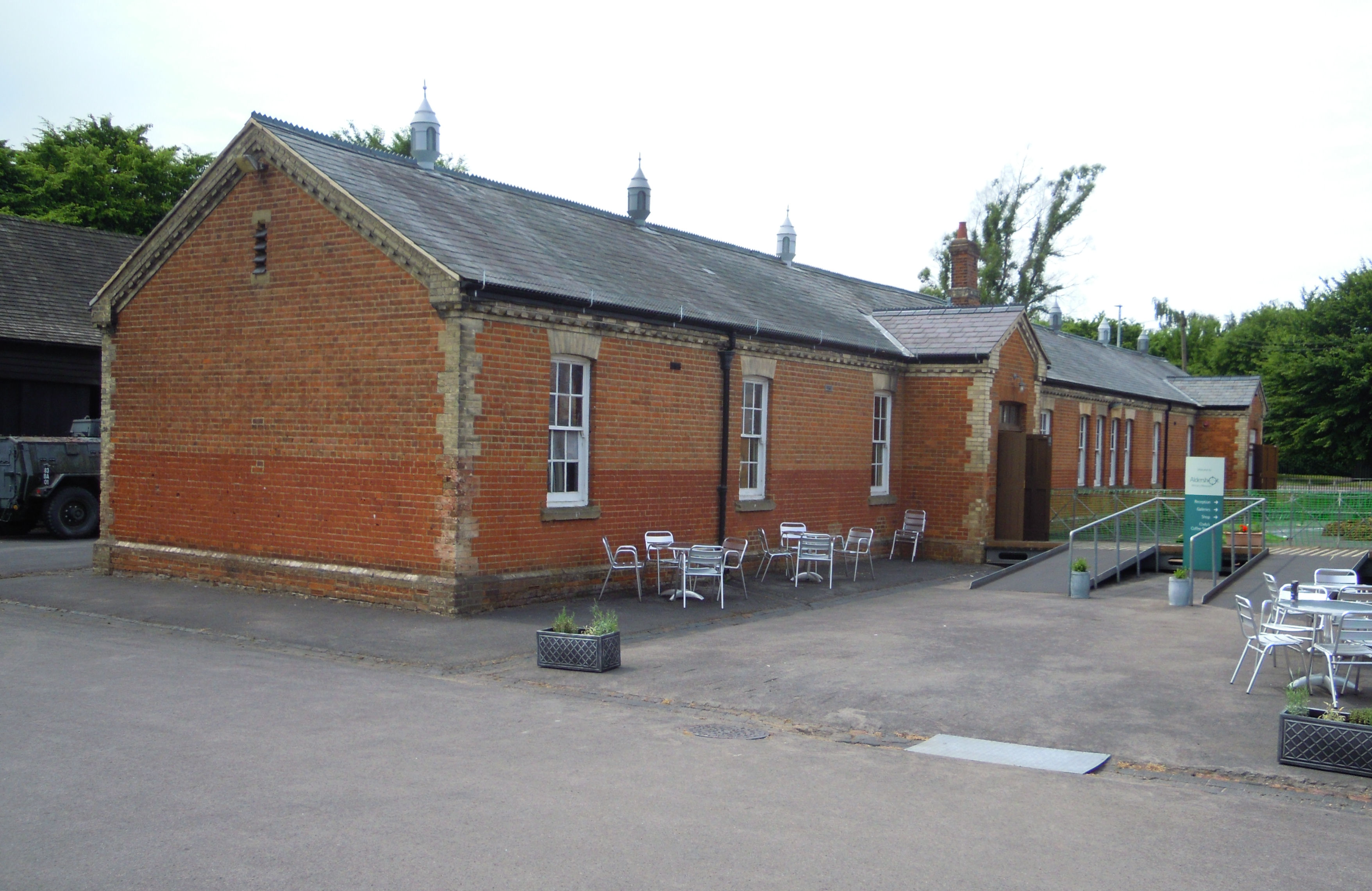
The M Block barracks of 1894 are Grade II listed buildings and house the museum

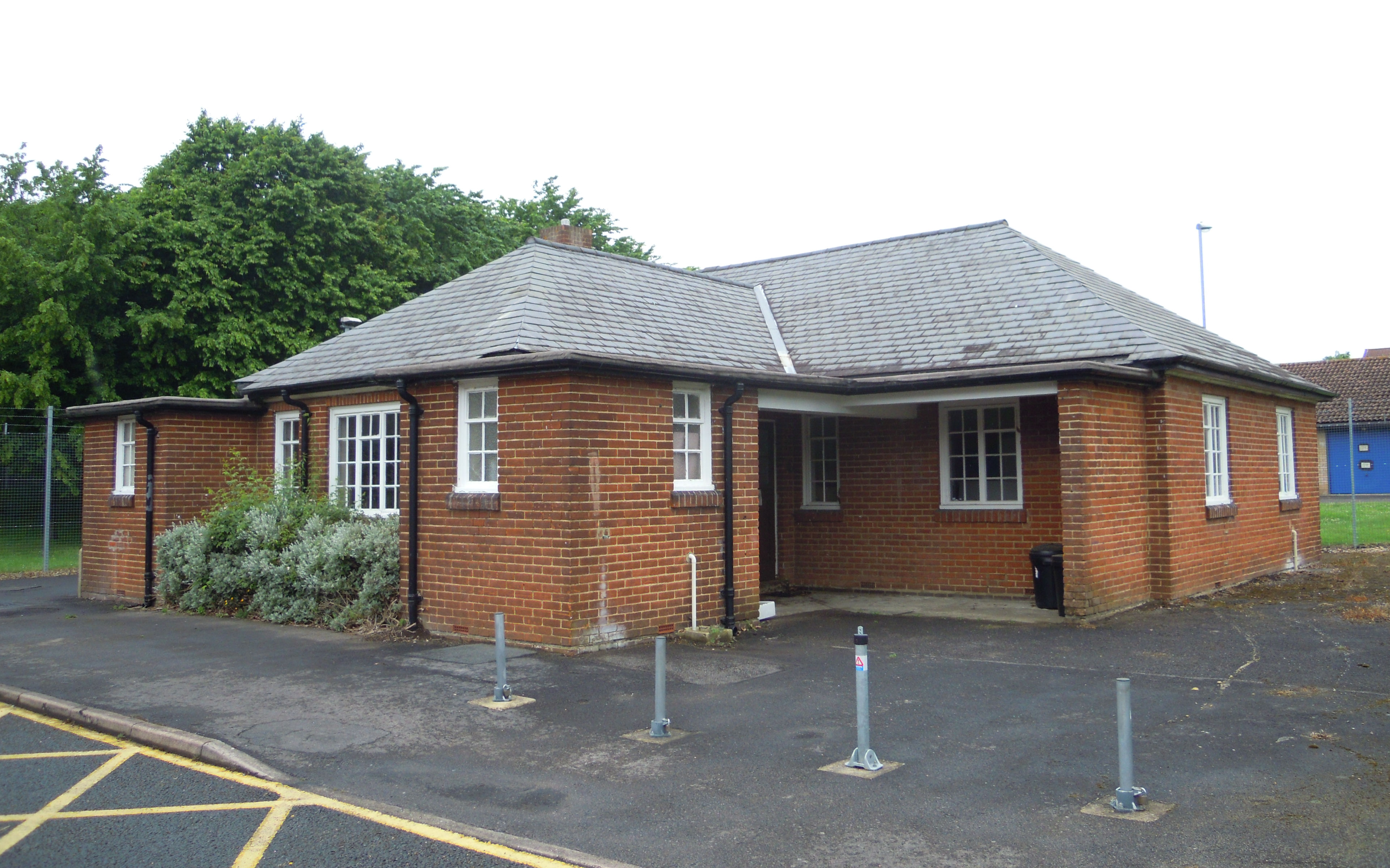
The barrack hut houses the museum archive

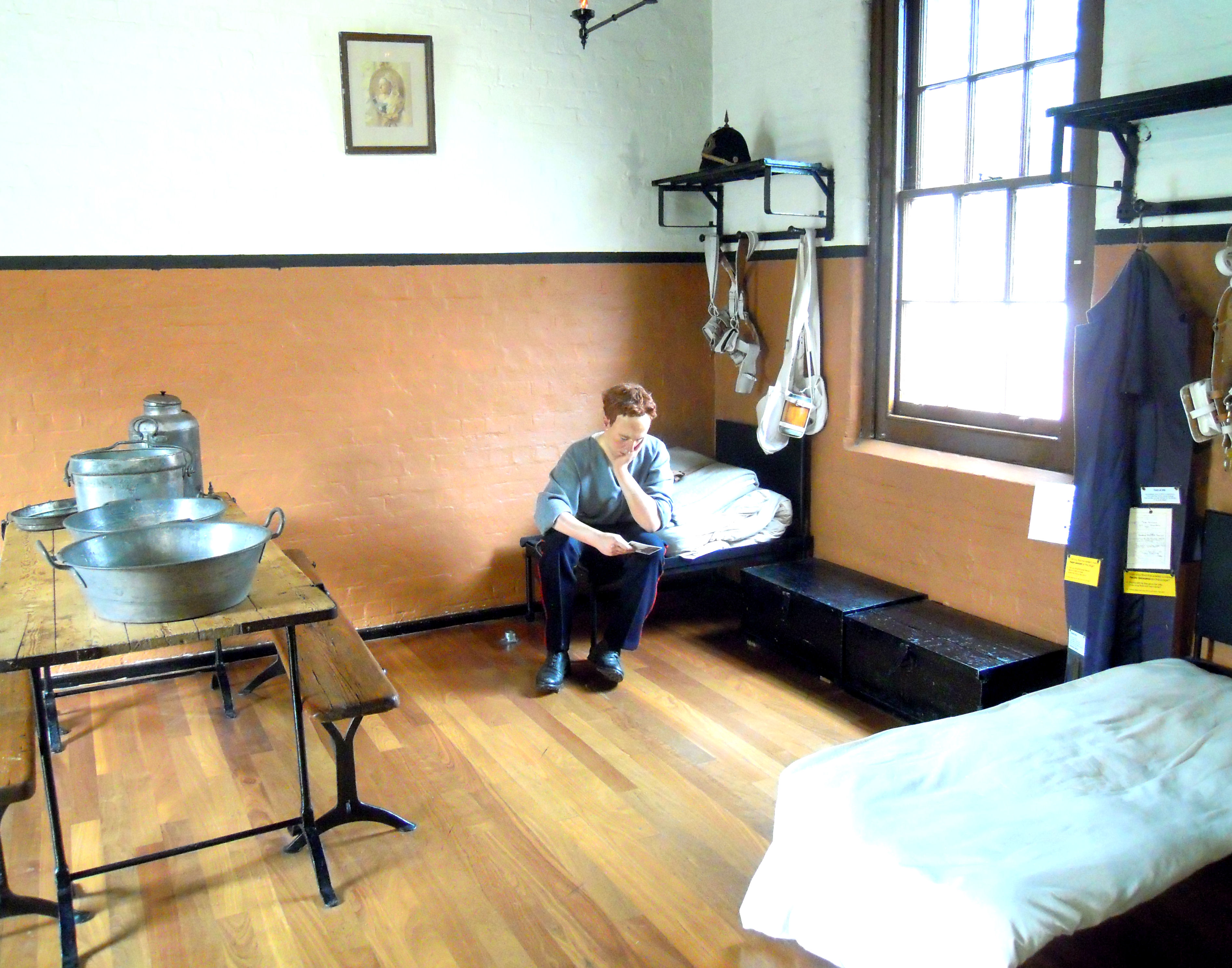
Reconstruction of a Victorian barrack room

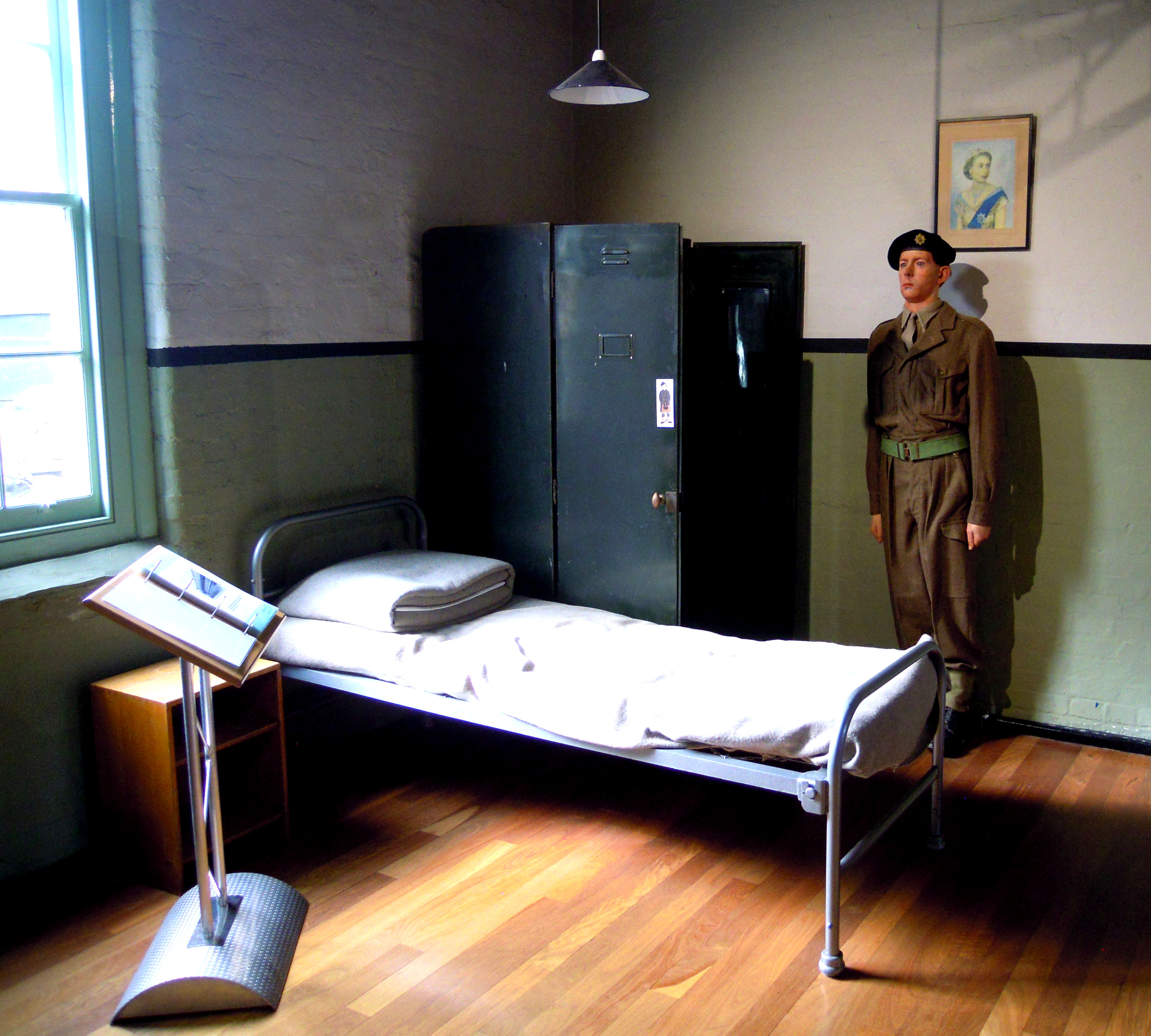
Reconstruction of a 1950s barrack room

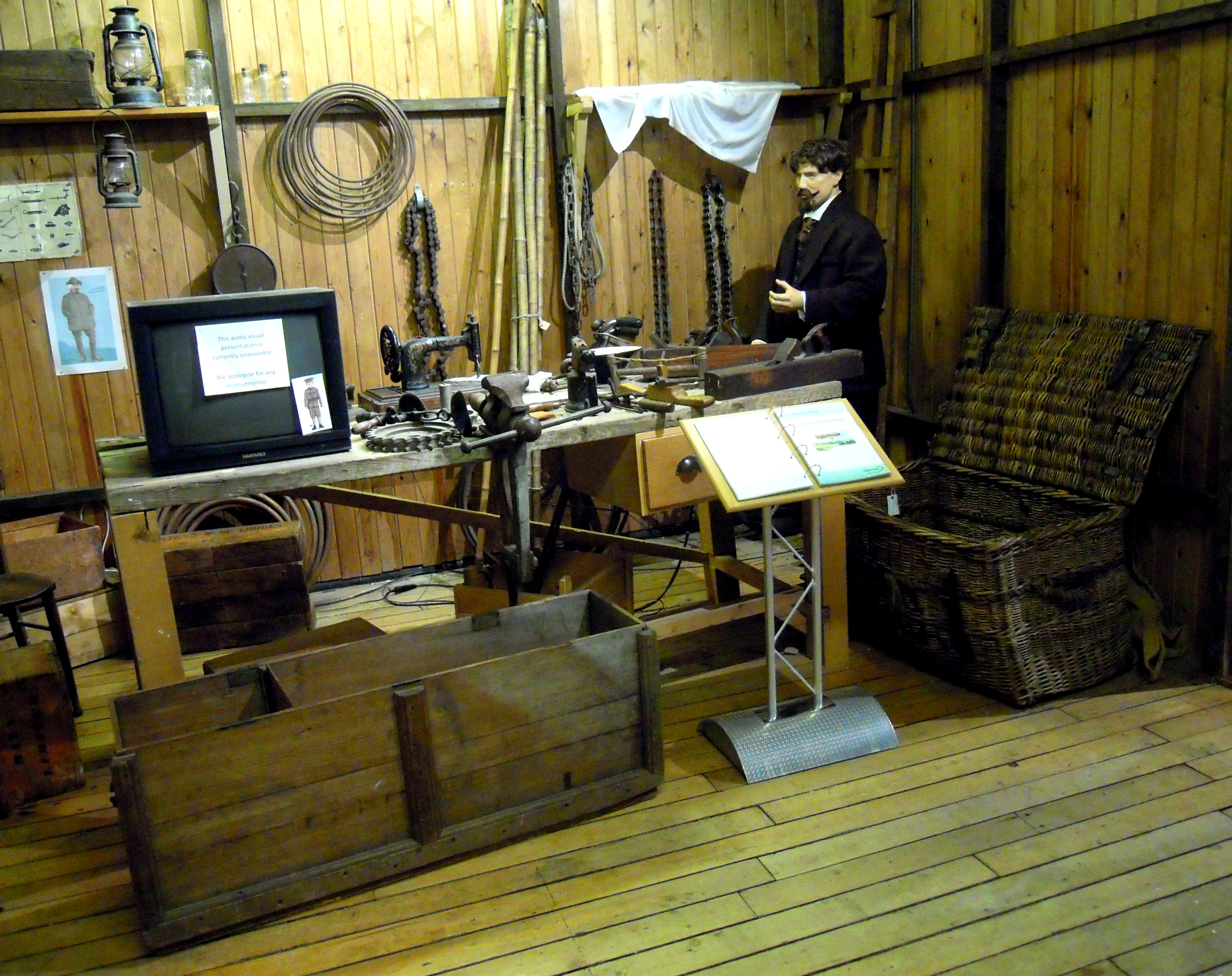
The Cody Gallery

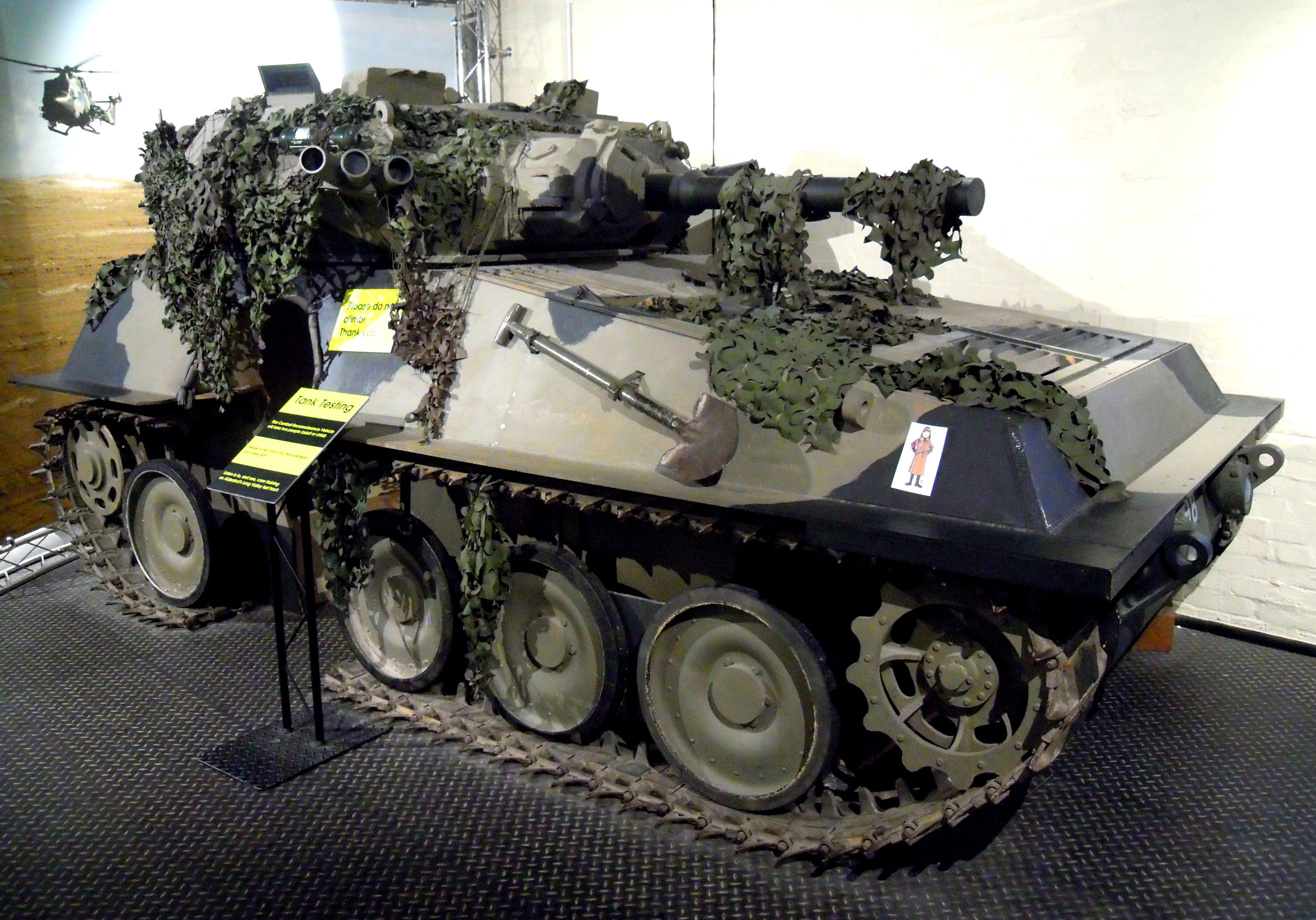
An interactive Combat Reconnaissance Vehicle

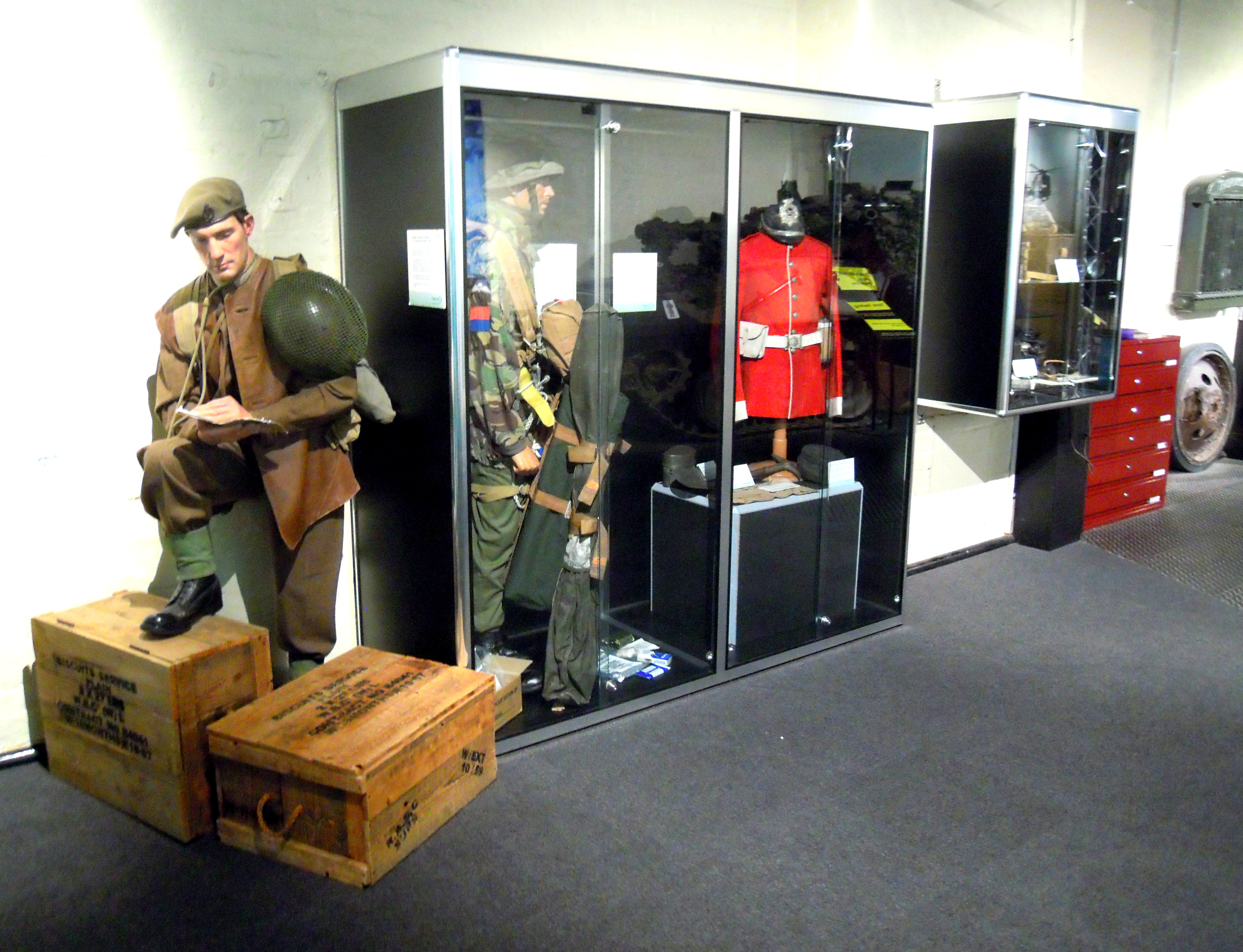
A uniform gallery in the museum

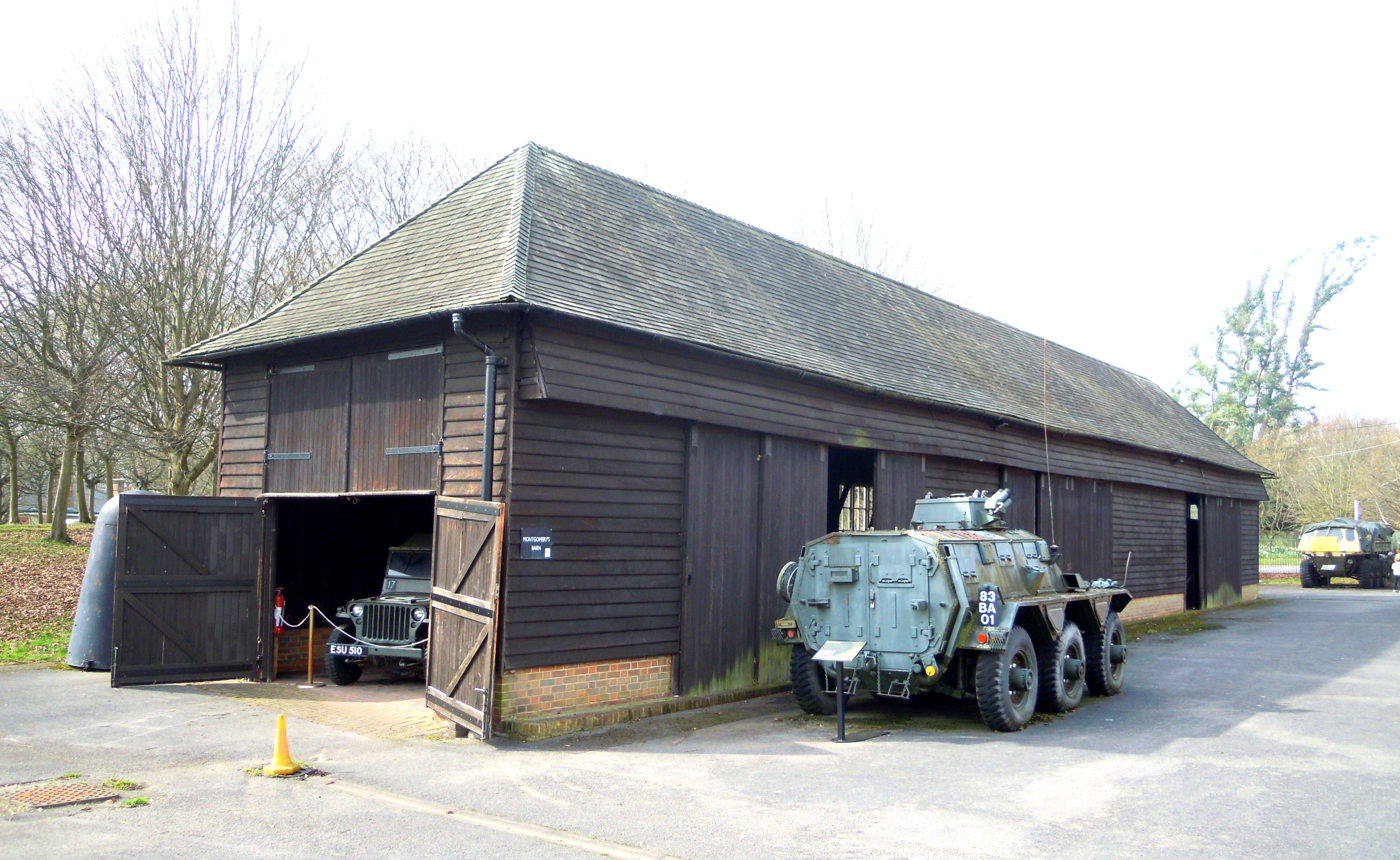
The Montgomery Gallery houses a collection of historic vehicles

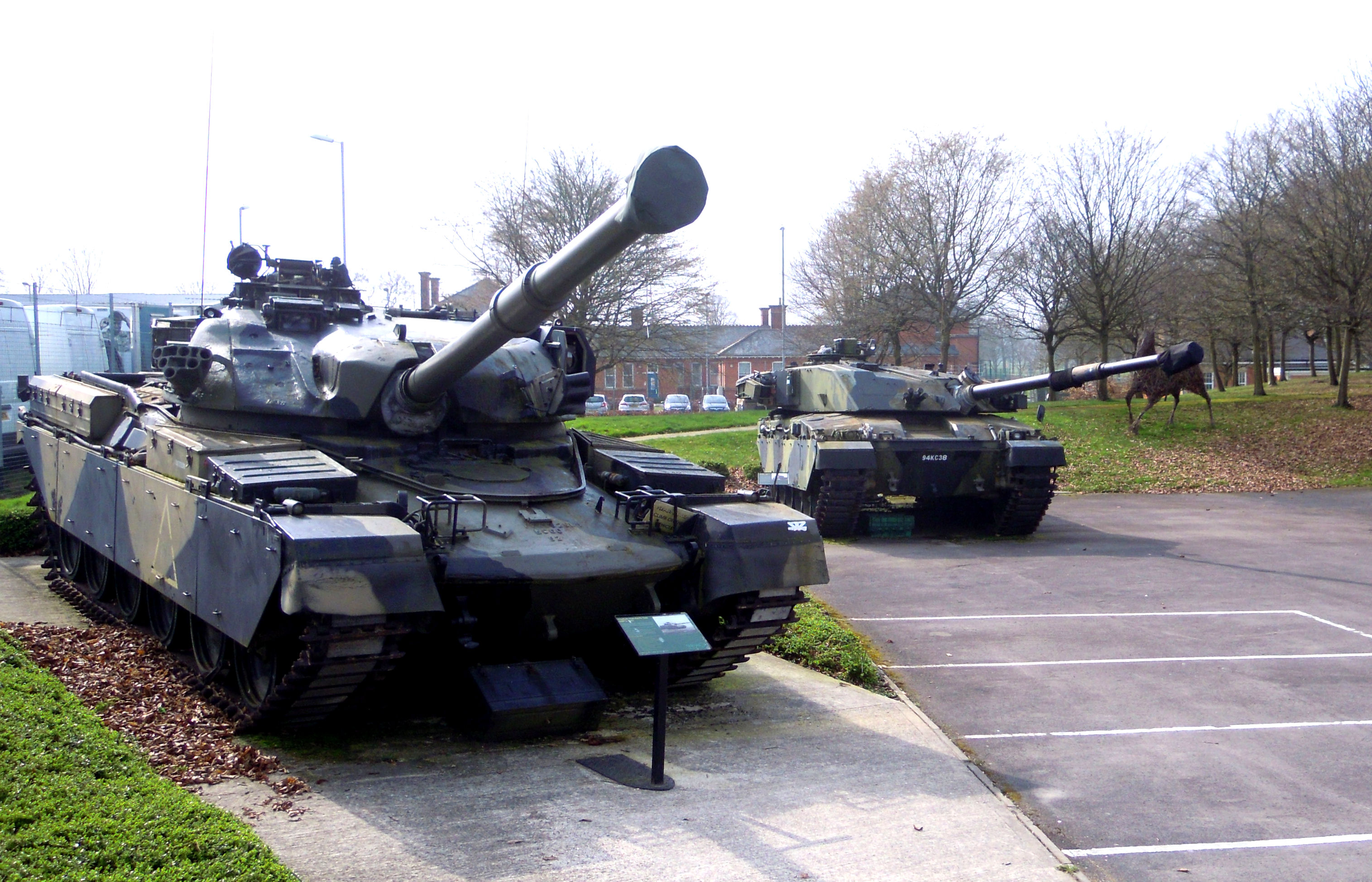
Chieftain and Challenger tanks are among the museum's collection of military vehicles
