= Richard Bradshaw (British Army officer) =

Lieutenant-General Sir Richard Bradshaw KBE FRCPath
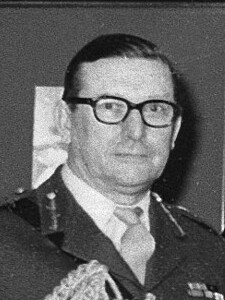
- Sir Richard Bradshaw at the official opening of RAMC, 1981
- Born: 1 August 1920
- Died: 12 October 1999 (aged 79)
- Military career
- Allegiance: United Kingdom
- Branch: British Army
- Service years: 1946–1981
- Rank: Lieutenant-General
- Nickname: Dick
- Service number: 371807
- Commands: Commandant RAMC Training Centre; Director General Army Medical Services
- Conflicts: Mau Mau uprising Cold War
- Awards: Knight Commander of the Order of the British Empire (KBE)

Lieutenant-General Sir Richard Phillip Bradshaw KBE FRCPath (1 August 1920 – 12 October 1999) was a senior British Army officer and doctor. He served as Director General Army Medical Services from 1977 to 1981.

== Early life ==
Bradshaw was born on 1 August 1920. He was educated at Newport High School, a comprehensive school in Newport, Wales. He studied medicine at Westminster Hospital Medical School, graduating in 1945.

== Military career ==
Bradshaw was commissioned into the Royal Army Medical Corps, British Army, on 9 November 1946 as a lieutenant. He was promoted to captain on 9 November 1947. On 24 November 1948, he transferred from an emergency commission to a short service commission. He spent his early career working in pathology in various United Kingdom based military hospitals and had one short, overseas posting to Sri Lanka. In 1950, he began a two-year posting to the War Office where he worked on laboratory policy. On 26 July 1951, he transferred to a regular commission. In 1952, he began the senior officers' course at the Royal Army Medical College, London. He then qualified as a specialist in pathology. He was promoted to major on 9 November 1954.

In 1954, during the Mau Mau uprising, he was posted to the East Africa Command as a pathologist. During the posting he was also commander of the British military hospital in Nairobi. In 1959, he was posted to Washington, D.C. as an exchange officer. There he worked at the Armed Forces Institute of Pathology. He was promoted to lieutenant colonel on 9 November 1961. From 1963 to 1966, he served as a research pathologist at the Chemical Defence Experimental Establishment, Porton Down. In 1966, he was posted to the headquarters of the British Army of the Rhine as Assistant Director of Pathology. On 9 November 1969, he was promoted to colonel. From 1969 to 1971, he was Professor of Pathology at the Royal Army Medical College.

Following his professorship, his career turned towards command and administration. He served as commanding officer of the Cambridge Military Hospital, Aldershot Garrison from 1971 to 1973. On 1 June 1973, he was promoted to brigadier. From 1973 to 1975, he was commandant of the RAMC Training Centre. He was once more posted to West Germany when, on 6 July 1975, he was appointed Director of Medical Services, British Army of the Rhine and made an acting major general. He was promoted to major general on 26 September 1975. On 30 March 1977, he was appointed Director General Army Medical Services and promoted to lieutenant-general. In the 1977 Queen's Birthday Honours, he was appointed Knight Commander of the Order of the British Empire (KBE).

On 7 April 1981, he retired from the British Army.

== Later life ==
Following his retirement from the military, Bradshaw served on a number of management committees of philanthropic and charitable organisations. His hobbies included bird watching and gardening.

He died on 12 October 1999.

Military offices
Preceded by Sir James Baird	Director General Army Medical Services; 1977–1981	Succeeded by Sir Alan Reay
