= Whittington, Staffordshire =

Village in Staffordshire, England

Coordinates: 52.67°N 1.76°W

Whittington
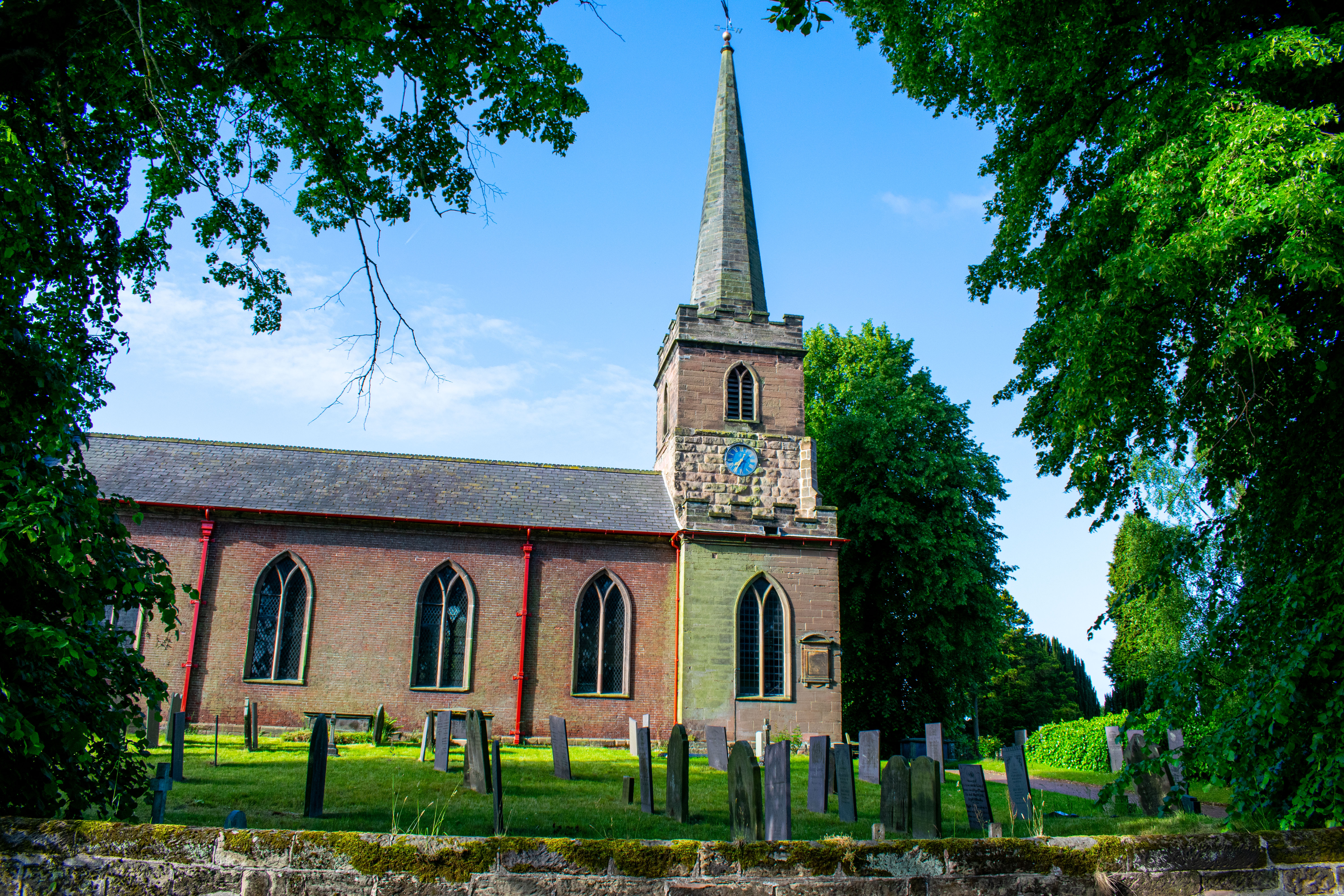
- St Giles Church, Whittington

- Location within Staffordshire
- Population: 2,603
- OS grid reference: SK162085
- Civil parish: Whittington
- District: Lichfield
- Shire county: Staffordshire
- Region: West Midlands
- Country: England
- Sovereign state: United Kingdom
- Post town: LICHFIELD
- Postcode district: WS14
- Dialling code: 01543
- Police: Staffordshire
- Fire: Staffordshire
- Ambulance: West Midlands
- UK Parliament: Lichfield

Whittington is a village and civil parish which lies approximately 3 miles south east of Lichfield, in the Lichfield district of Staffordshire, England. According to the 2001 census it had a population of 2,591, increasing to 2,603 at the 2011 Census. The parish council is a joint one with Fisherwick. The Coventry Canal borders the village to the north and east.

== History ==
The place name of Whittington derives from the Old English for an estate associated with a man called Hwīta. Hwīta was an Anglo-Saxon personal name meaning 'white', given to someone with fair hair or pale complexion.

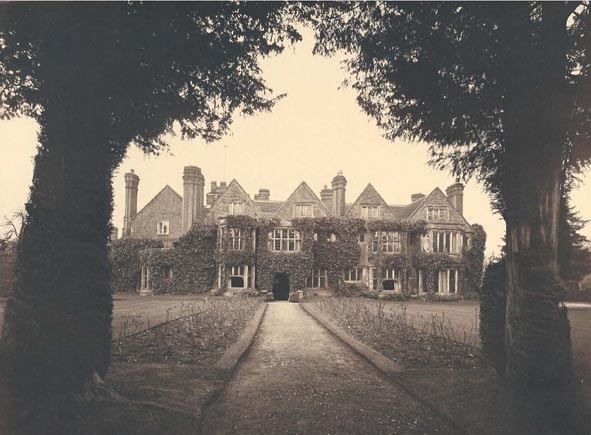
Whittington Old Hall, the ancient medieval manor house of Whittington

Whittington formed part of the Bishop of Lichfield's great manorial estate, which covered much of south-east Staffordshire. Known as the Manor of Longdon, it had been created for the bishop of Lichfield from the time of the Saxons, they remained the lord of the manor until 1546 when the bishop was forced to surrender it to Sir William Paget, one of Henry VIII's principal Secretaries of State, who was given vast tracts of land in Staffordshire as a reward for his service.

Whittington Old Hall is an ancient medieval manor house, it is not known exactly when the original Hall was built, but it is highly likely that the early Tudor builders retained the old foundations of the medieval great hall with screen porch and cellars and erected a half-timbered mansion. In the Elizabethan era, the whole of the south front with a portion of the entrance front were entirely re-clad with brick and stonework, complete with striking bays and stone mullioned windows. It is a Grade II* listed building.

The mesne-lords in the 16th century were the Clerkson family, whose female heir married into the Everard family. By the 17th century the Babington family owned large tracts of land in the area and built a grand mansion at nearby Packington Hall which passed by marriage to the Levett family. The Dyott family who were major land owners in the village in the 18th and 19th centuries, lived at nearby Freeford Hall.

In 1741, Sarah Neal left her house and croft in Whittington to start a school for poor children of the village. Funds were augmented when the Reverend Richard Levett died in 1802, leaving a legacy and in 1864, a handsome gothic building for a girls' and infants' school was built by Lieut.-Col. Richard Dyott. Village children continued to be educated here until 1968 when a new school was built in Common Lane.

During the 18th century Whittington Heath was the site of the Lichfield Races, one of the largest and well attended horse racing meetings in the Midlands. A grandstand was erected in 1773 near the Lichfield-Tamworth Road, however, by the 19th century the popularity of the races dwindled, and military use of the heath grew.

Under the Cardwell Reforms of the army, the War Office approached the Marquess of Anglesey in 1875 to buy the heath for the building of Whittington Barracks. Construction of the barracks for the depots of the two regiments and for a militia battalion (of which there were four in the county) started on Whittington Heath in 1877. 1881 was the date recorded as the formal handing over of the newly built barracks to the military.

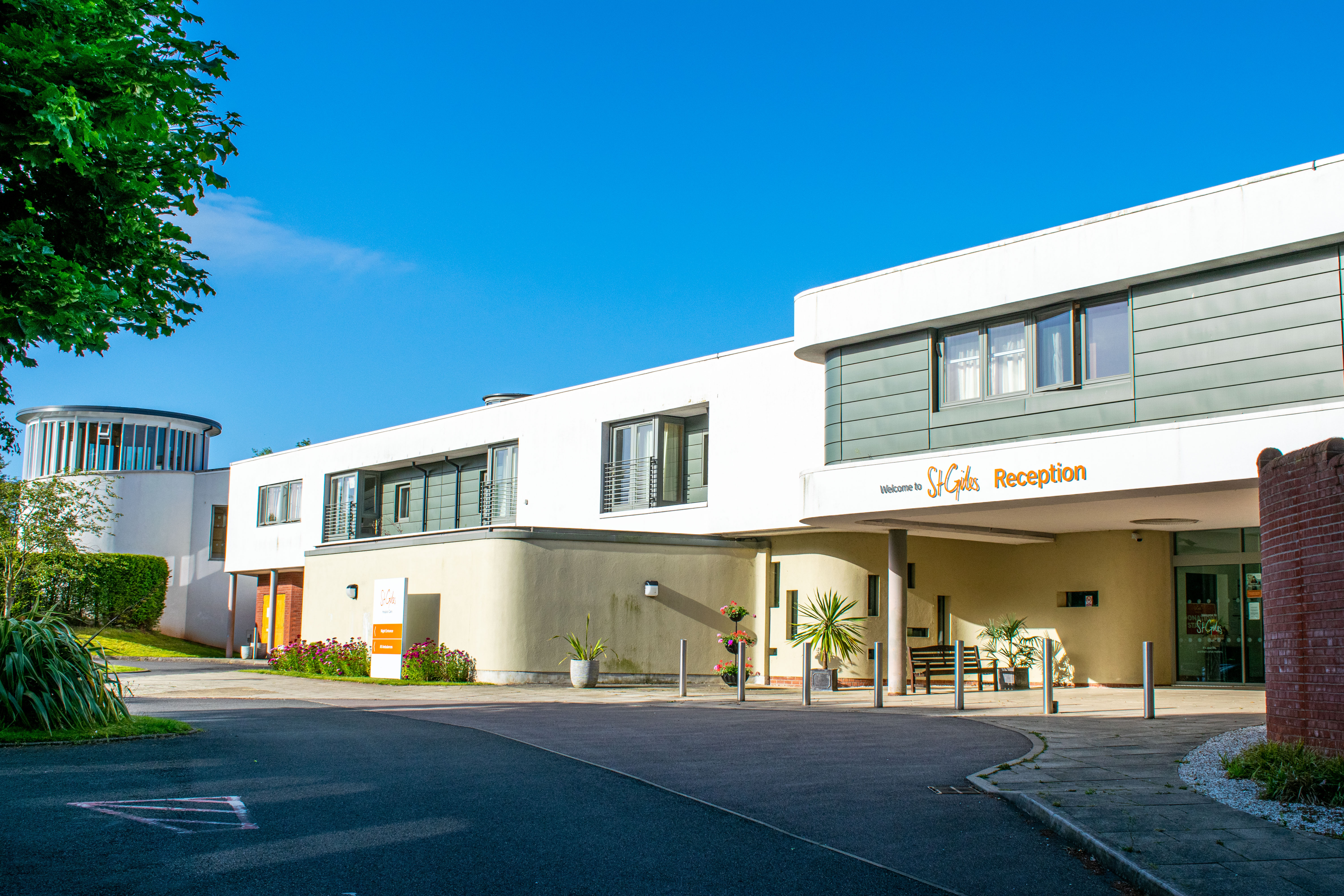
St Giles Hospice

The Lichfield Races are remembered in the names of pubs called the Horse & Jockey and in Lichfield, The Scales which was where jockeys were "weighed in". The old grandstand became a soldiers home before it was purchased in 1957 by Whittington Heath Golf Course as its clubhouse.

In the late 1970s the vicar of Whittington, Reverend Paul Brothwell became concerned about the quality of care available in local hospitals to patients with terminal illnesses. St Giles Hospice was established in 1983 on the site of the old Vicarage, it has since grown to become a major institution for palliative care in the Midlands.

== Religious sites ==
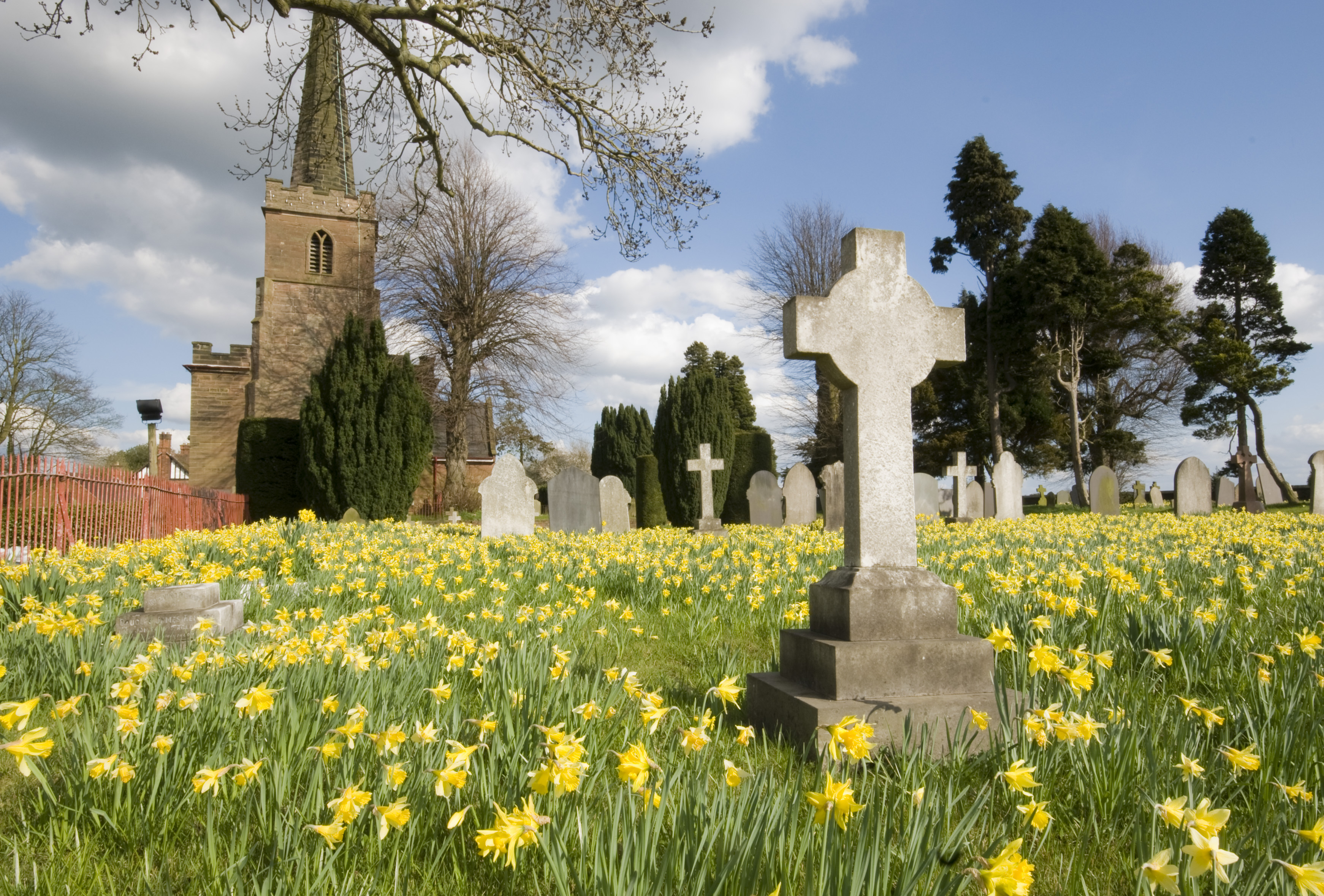
St Giles Church

The church of St Giles was built in the 13th century using sandstone quarried from Hopwas Hayes wood. It was destroyed by fire in 1760, and was rebuilt largely in brick in the Georgian style. The church contains memorial panelling for Samuel Lipscomb Seckham (1827–1900), architect and High Sheriff of Staffordshire, who carried out a major restoration of Whittington Old Hall, in the late 19th century.

The Levett family produced three vicars of Whittington, this was due to the fact that Theophilus Levett purchased the advowson of Whittington church from John Cooper of Aldridge in 1735. The 'right of advowson' was the archaic right to nominate the position of parish priest. Rev. Richard Levett served as vicar from 1743 to 1751. His son, also Rev. Richard Levett, served as vicar of Whittington from 1795 to 1796 and Rev. Thomas Levett served for forty years, from 1796 to 1836. There are memorials to the Levetts in St Giles Church. Large landowners, the family also established charitable gifts towards the Whittington Free School. A subsequent rector of Whittington was Hon. Rev. George Barrington Legge, son of William Legge, 4th Earl of Dartmouth, who was married to the daughter of John Levett of Wychnor Park.

The co-founder of Marks & Spencer plc, Thomas Spencer, is buried at St Giles Church, Whittington. The churchyard also contains Commonwealth war graves of 47 service personnel of the First and Second World Wars.

== Notable people ==
- Rev. Thomas Levett (1770–1843), served as rector of Whittington, Staffordshire, for 40 years, also a large landowner
- Paul Addison, FRSE (1943–2020), historian, who researched the political history of Britain during WWII

== See also ==
- Listed buildings in Whittington, Staffordshire
