= Queen Elizabeth Barracks, Church Crookham =

British Army barracks

Queen Elizabeth Barracks
- Church Crookham
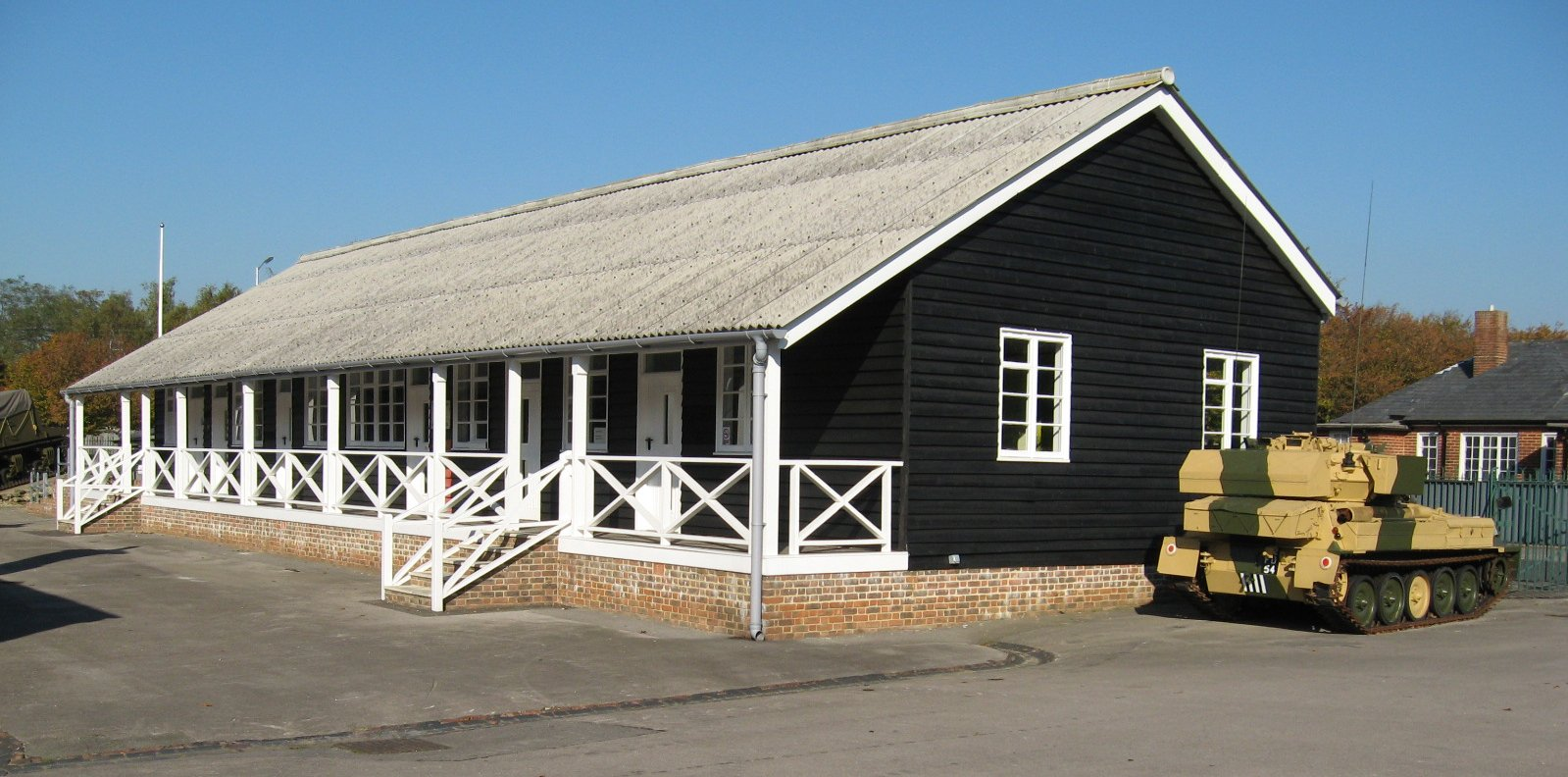
- The main administration building, now known as the "Boyce Building"

Site information
- Type: Barracks
- Owner: Ministry of Defence
- Operator: British Army

Location
- Location within Hampshire
- Coordinates: 51.2544°N 0.8312°W

Site history
- Built: 1938
- Built for: War Office
- In use: 1938-2000

Queen Elizabeth Barracks was a military installation at Church Crookham, Hampshire, England.

== History ==
The barracks, which were originally known as Boyce Barracks after Major William Wallace Boyce, DSO, RAMC, were built as a training depot for the Royal Army Medical Corps in 1938. The barracks were renamed Queen Elizabeth Barracks following a visit by Queen Elizabeth in 1948. The wooden hutted camp, with barrack blocks arranged as 'spiders', could accommodate 2,500 soldiers.

Between January 1963 and January 2003, 9 Parachute Squadron, Royal Engineers was based at Haig Lines.

The Royal Army Medical Corps moved their depot to Keogh Barracks in 1964 and were replaced by training regiments of the Royal Corps of Transport in 1965 and by the Gurkha Regiments in 1970. After the Gurkha Regiments left in 2000, the site was decommissioned and acquired by Bryant Homes in 2002. It was initially renamed Khukri Park, but following acquisition by Taylor Wimpey, it was renamed Crookham Park. The main administration building was moved to the Aldershot Military Museum.
