= Mytchett =

Village in Surrey, England

Coordinates: 51.2943°N 0.7268°W

- Location within Surrey
- Area: 4.26 km^{2} (1.64 sq mi)
- Population: 4,624 (2011 Census)
  - Density: 1,085/km^{2} (2,810/sq mi)
- OS grid reference: SU888557 (centre)
- District: Surrey Heath
- Shire county: Surrey
- Region: South East
- Country: England
- Sovereign state: United Kingdom
- Post town: Camberley
- Postcode district: GU16
- Dialling code: 01252
- Police: Surrey
- Fire: Surrey
- Ambulance: South East Coast
- UK Parliament: Surrey Heath

Mytchett /mɪtʃɪt/ is a village in the south-west corner of the borough of Surrey Heath, in Surrey, England. It is approximately 30 mi (48 km) south-west of central London and 2 miles (3 km) to the east of Farnborough, its nearest town. Much of the village dates from the first half of the twentieth century. Mytchett had a population of 4,624 in the 2011 Census.

== Geography ==
The settlement commences at the foot of the heath known as the upper Bagshot Formation where it forms sandy and occasionally peat bog or marsh depressions, ridges and plains. The heath gives rise to the name of the wider borough and sprouts patches of gorse, heather, pines and silver birches; it has been officially recognised as Pirbright and Ash Commons, part of a Special Area of Conservation which spills over in the north into Chobham Common and in the south to Thursley Common, totalling 5,154 hectares (20 mi^{2}).

Mytchett forms an eastern flank of the Farnborough/Aldershot Built-up Area, a conurbation straddling a small part of the two counties mentioned (Surrey and Hampshire) and Berkshire.

The village including small parks, sports grounds and schools spans more than 1 mile (1.6 km) north to south. It is bounded to the north by the South West Main Line, to the east by the Basingstoke Canal and west by the River Blackwater—its maximum width is 3/4 mile (1.2 km).

The crossroads has been the location of a main community centre since the late 1980s, hosting clubs in sports and leisure. It has indoor sports facilities and accommodates two full-size football pitches and other training pitches. Within visibility of the centre is the Tamu Nepalese Community Centre to the south founded by the locally numerous British Nepalese community.

The village has shops 1/2 mile north of this point, on a direct road to Frimley Green and Frimley. The nearest Post Office is located in Frimley Green, after Mytchett's post office became a grocery convenience store in June 2012.

The population of all usual residents rose from the 2001 to the 2011 census from 4,616 to 4,624.

== History ==
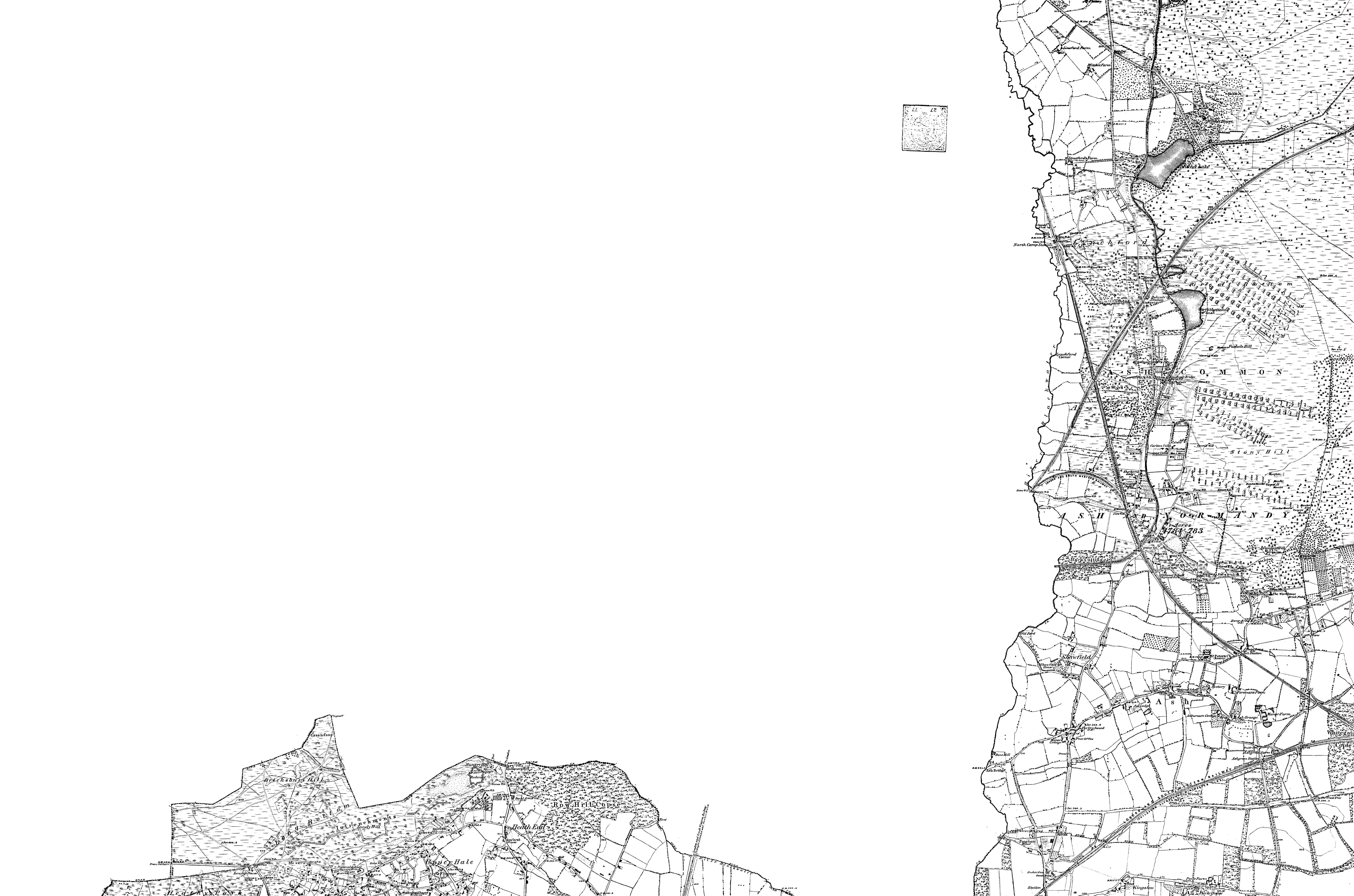
Extract from Map of Surrey, Ordnance Survey, 1871–1882 showing the south and centre of the present area of Mytchett. Mytchett was almost entirely agricultural or (barren) heath.

The area was squarely in the middle of the very long north-south parish of Ash for about a millennium—from at least 1000 AD until 1866 when Mytchett became the south of the new parish of Frimley, itself formerly a chapelry occupying the northern half, or more, of Ash.

The Frimley parent area as to vestry administration and people's parish identity covered "the western side of Chobham Ridges, and extend[ed] down into the valley of the Blackwater, which bounds the county. The soil is, therefore, Bagshot sand and alluvium, with patches of gravel and large beds of peat. In the latter conifers and rhododendrons flourish exceedingly. The Heatherside Nurseries, where are some of the finest Wellingtonias in England, may be taken as the typical industry of the neighbourhood, which is otherwise a residential district, or occupied by those connected with Aldershot, the Staff College, which is in the parish, and Sandhurst which lies just outside it. A very great part of the parish was open land, heather-covered, before...1801. Much of it is still uncultivated."

North of the area the Royal Albert Orphan Asylum was built in 1864. It had in 1911 about two hundred resident boys and girls; a farm was attached to it. A national school was built in 1842 and enlarged in 1897.

At the close of the agrarian age, the Frimley Inclosure Act 1801 (41 Geo. 3. (U.K.) c. 123 Pr.) made large inclosures of "waste" (unproductive land with its own somewhat communal legal characteristics), but reserves certain rights of fuel (peat turf) to the inhabitants. The final common fields were inclosed under an act of Parliament passed in 1826.

A village arose in about the 1900s at Mytchett Crossroads at what was the edge of Michet Farm. The area is shown undeveloped in maps of the late 19th century. Almost wholly residential with associated common public amenities, especially in sports, Mytchett has mainly been built since the 1930s. Pace of building has been relatively gradual; many houses have been substantially altered and extended.

=== Detention of Rudolf Hess ===
On 20 May 1941, Rudolf Hess was transported from the Tower of London to Camp Z which was at Mytchett Place. This had been specially set up for his arrival with heavy security and bugging devices. Hess spent 13 months at Camp Z, which was the scene for one of his suicide attempts; he had thrown himself off a balcony on 15 June 1941.

The June 1942 move from Mytchett Place was to become notable following the release of MI5 files in 1999. Previously unfounded rumours had claimed that Hess was moved because intelligence reports indicated that a Polish group was planning to break into the Camp Z, kidnap Hess, and beat or kill him by way of revenge for Nazi atrocities in Poland. The MI5 files included a reference to reports of a gun battle between Polish soldiers and guards at Mytchett, although no precise details were given, so the link is not conclusive.

== Transport ==
Railway services are operated by South Western Railway; the nearest railway stations are:

- Ash Vale facilitates half-hourly trains direct to London Waterloo, which is 0.7 miles (1.1 km) away
- Farnborough North on the North Downs Line, with services to Reading and Guildford
- Farnborough (Main) on the South West Main Line, with fast and semi-fast services to Basingstoke and London Waterloo; it is 3 miles (4.8 km) away.

Mytchett is close to junctions with an arterial road, the A331 Blackwater Valley Route dual carriageway, which connects to the motorway network. The main road through the village, Mytchett Road, runs north to south, and is classified B3411.

Local bus routes are operated by Stagecoach South, which connect the area with Farnborough, Aldershot, Camberley and Yateley.

== Notable residents ==
- Jeremy Hardy, comedian and impressionist.
- Alan Hope, politician, born at Mytchett in June 1942.
