= Norton Bridge =

Norton Bridge may refer to:

- Norton Bridge, Staffordshire, a village in Staffordshire, United Kingdom
  - Norton Bridge railway station, a former railway station serving the village
  - Norton Bridge rail crash, a railway accident that occurred in the village
- Norton Bridge, Sri Lanka, a village in Sri Lanka
- Emperor Norton Bridge, a name used for the San Francisco–Oakland Bay Bridge, or for one of the bridge's constituent crossings
