= Listed buildings in Chebsey =

Chebsey is a civil parish in the Borough of Stafford, Staffordshire, England. It contains 16 listed buildings that are recorded in the National Heritage List for England. Of these, one is listed at Grade I, the highest of the three grades, and the others are at Grade II, the lowest grade. The parish contains villages, including Chebsey, Norton Bridge, and Shallowford, and the surrounding countryside. Apart from a church with Norman origin, all the listed buildings are houses, cottages and farmhouses, the earliest of which are timber framed or have timber framed cores.

== Key ==
| Grade | Criteria |
|---|---|
| I | Buildings of exceptional interest, sometimes considered to be internationally important |
| II | Buildings of national importance and special interest |

== Buildings ==
| Name and location | Photograph | Date | Notes | Grade |
|---|---|---|---|---|
| All Saints Church; 52.85464°N 2.20975°W | | Norman | The church has been altered and extended during the following centuries. It is in stone with a tile roof, and consists of a nave, a south aisle, a south porch, a chancel, and a west tower. The Norman features include the north doorway and windows on the north side of the church. The south arcade is in Early English style, as are the south doorway and the chancel arch. The tower, which has a circular stair turret to the southeast, and an embattled parapet with eight cricketed pinnacles, is in Perpendicular style. | I |
| Greenhill Cottage, Shallowford; 52.86198°N 2.18588°W | | Early 17th century (probable) | Formerly two cottages, later one, it has been extended and altered. The early part is timber framed with brick infill, the later part is in painted brick, and the roof is tiled. There is one storey and an attic, a later gabled wing on the left, a two-bay range on the right, the right bay gabled. The windows are casements, and there is a box dormer. Inside there is a pair of raised crucks. | II |
| Hammerhouse Farmhouse; 52.87037°N 2.19542°W | — | 17th century | The farmhouse, which has been altered, is timber framed with painted brick infill and a tile roof. There are two storeys and five bays. On the front is a later brick porch, and the windows are casements. | II |
| Izaak Walton's Cottage, Shallowford; 52.85853°N 2.18581°W | | 17th century | The cottage, which has been much restored and used as a museum, is timber framed with painted brick infill, and has a thatched roof. There is one storey and an attic, and three bays. The windows are casements, and there is internal timber framing. | II |
| Pair of Cottages, Chebsey; 52.85526°N 2.20774°W | — | 17th century | The cottages are partly timber framed and partly in red brick with tile roofs. There are two storeys, the right hand cottage has a gable and a doorway at the rear, and the left hand cottage has a doorway on the front. The windows are casements. | II |
| Park Lane Cottages; 52.85545°N 2.20787°W | — | 17th century | A house that has been much altered, extended, and divided into two dwellings. It has a timber framed core, the front is in red brick, and the roof is tiled. There are two storeys, on the right is a projecting gabled wing, to the left are three bays, there is a single-storey wing on the left, and a rear wing. The doorway has pilasters and a cornice hood, and the windows are modern casements. On the east front is exposed timber framing on a stone plinth. | II |
| Quaker Farmhouse, Shallowford; 52.86057°N 2.18724°W | — | 17th century | The farmhouse has a timber framed core, with external walls in red brick on a stone plinth, and a tile roof. There are two storeys and a T-shaped plan, consisting of a projecting gabled cross-wing on the left, and a later two-bay range to the right. The doorway has a rectangular fanlight, and the windows are casements. There is some exposed timber framing on the west side, and the interior is timber framed throughout. | II |
| Riverside Cottage, Shallowford; 52.86133°N 2.18567°W | | 17th century | A cottage in painted brick and timber framing with brick infill and a tile roof. There is one storey and an attic, two bays, and a later single-storey wing to the left. On the wing is a gabled porch, the windows are casements, and there are two gabled dormers. | II |
| The Green; 52.85579°N 2.20828°W | — | 17th century | The house, which has been altered, is partly timber framed and partly in brick, and has a tile roof. There are two storeys and two bays. | II |
| Chebsey House; 52.85715°N 2.20639°W | | Early 18th century | The house has a timber framed core, it is in red brick, and has a tile roof with three gables at the front. There are two storeys and attics, three bays, and a rear gabled wing. The windows are casements, and inside there is some exposed timber framing. | II |
| House occupied by Mr Silvester and Post Office; 52.85514°N 2.20741°W | — | Late 18th century (probable) | A red brick house with a tile roof, two storeys, and two bays. On the front are two doorways and casement windows, all with cambered heads. | II |
| House occupied by Mr Burdett; 52.85519°N 2.20759°W | — | c. 1800 | The house, which has been much altered, is rendered and has a tile roof. There are two storeys and three bays. The doorway has a gabled hood on brackets, there is a canted oriel window to the right, and the other windows are modern casements. | II |
| Hilcote Hall; 52.86419°N 2.22879°W | | Early 19th century | A painted brick house with a hipped slate roof, two storeys, eight bays, and a lower rear wing. On the west front are rusticated pilasters, two canted bay windows, a porch with a pediment, and a doorway with a moulded surround. The windows are sashes. | II |
| Riverside Farmhouse; 52.85479°N 2.20875°W | — | Early 19th century | The farmhouse probably has a 17th-century core, and is in buff brick, with overhanging eaves and a tile roof. There are two storeys and an attic, and it contains casement windows with cambered heads, two canted bay windows, and a gabled porch. There is some exposed timber framing at the rear. | II |
| The Mount; 52.85697°N 2.20834°W | | Early 19th century | A red brick house with a sill band, projecting eaves, and a slate roof. There are two storeys and three bays, the middle bay projecting and bowed. In the centre is a porch with Tuscan columns, and the windows are a mix of sashes and casements. | II |
| The Junction, Norton Bridge; 52.86741°N 2.19233°W | | Early to mid 19th century | The house, at one time a public house, is in red and blue brick, with corbelled eaves, and a tile roof with three gables on the front. There are two storeys and three bays. The central doorway is arched, and the windows are casements with pointed arched heads and diagonal glazing bars. | II |
