= Izaak Walton =

English author (c. 1593 – 1683)

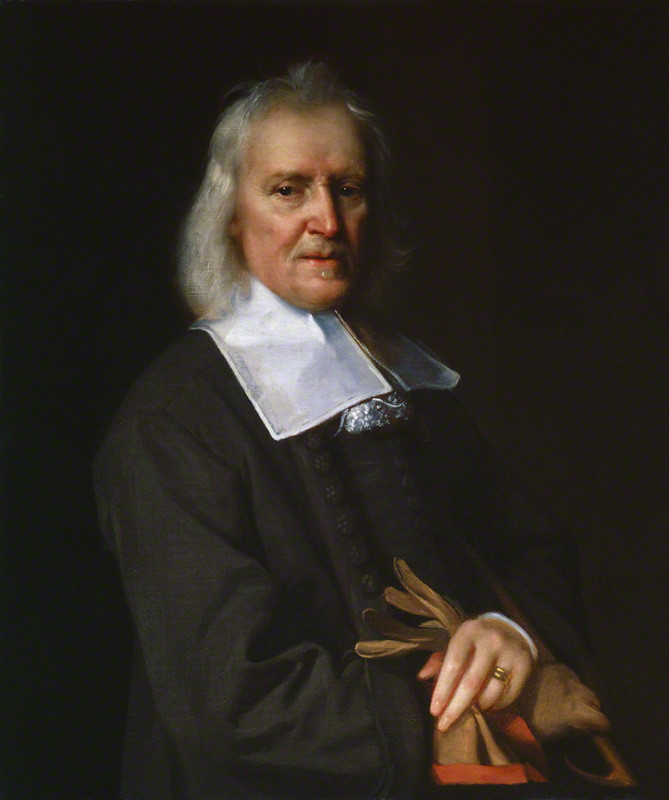
- Portrait by Jacob Huysmans, c. 1672
- Born: Izaak Walton c. 1593; Stafford, England
- Died: 25 December 1683 (aged 90); Winchester, England
- Spouses: Rachel Floud (m. 1626; died 1640); Anne Ken (m. 1641?–1662)
- Writing career
- Notable work: The Compleat Angler (1653)

Walton's house at '120 Chancery Lane' occupied 1627–1644 (from Old & New London, Walter Thornbury, 1872)

Izaak Walton (baptised 21 September 1593 – 15 December 1683) was an English writer. Best known as the author of The Compleat Angler (1653), he also wrote a number of short biographies including one of his friend John Donne. They have been collected under the title of Walton's Lives.

Born at Stafford around 1593, Walton moved to London in his teens, where he worked as a linen draper. In the capital, he befriended the poet and clergyman John Donne. A Royalist during the English Civil War, Walton returned to his home county of Staffordshire, settling at Shallowford, following the Royalist defeat at Marston Moor in 1644. Though Walton had returned to London by 1650, his experiences at Shallowford provided material for The Compleat Angler: a celebration of the art and spirit of fishing, first published in 1653. Throughout his life, Walton published biographies of subjects including Donne and Henry Wotton. These were later collected as Walton's Lives.

Walton's literary admirers have included Charles Lamb and he gives his name to places and organisations in his native country, the United States, and Kenya. Walton left his residence at Shallowford to the local poor. It is now maintained as a museum to his legacy.

== Biography ==
Walton was born at Stafford in c. 1593. The register of his baptism on 21 September 1593 gives his father's name as Jervis, or Gervase. His father, who was an innkeeper as well as a landlord of a tavern, died before Izaak was three, being buried in February 1596/7 (Note: See dual dating.) as Jarvicus Walton. His mother then married another innkeeper by the name of Bourne, who later ran the Swan in Stafford. Izaak also had a brother named Ambrose, as indicated by an entry in the parish register recording the burial in March 1595/6 of an Ambrosius filius Jervis Walton.

His date of birth is traditionally given as 9 August 1593. However, this date is based on a misinterpretation of his will, which he began on 9 August 1683.

He is believed to have been educated in Stafford before moving to London in his teens. He is often described as an ironmonger, but he trained as a linen draper, a trade which came under the Ironmongers' Company. He had a small shop in the upper storey of Thomas Gresham's Royal Burse or Exchange in Cornhill. In 1614 he had a shop in Fleet Street, two doors west of Chancery Lane in the parish of St Dunstan's. He became verger and churchwarden of the church, and a friend of the vicar, John Donne. He joined the Ironmongers' Company in November 1618. Walton's first wife was Rachel Floud (married December 1626), a great-great-niece of Archbishop Cranmer. She died in 1640. He soon remarried, to Anne Ken (m. 1641?–1662), who appears as the pastoral Kenna of The Angler's Wish; she was a stepsister of Thomas Ken, afterwards bishop of Bath and Wells.

After the Royalist defeat at Marston Moor in 1644, Walton retired from his trade. The last forty years of his life were spent visiting eminent clergymen and others who enjoyed fishing, compiling the biographies of people he liked, and collecting information for The Compleat Angler.

He went to live just north of his birthplace, at a spot between the towns of Stafford and Stone, where he had bought some land edged by a small river. His new land at Shallowford included a farm, and a parcel of land; however by 1650 he was living in Clerkenwell, London.

He published the first of his several biographies of clergymen, a life of John Donne, in 1640. The first edition of his most famous book,The Compleat Angler, was published in 1653. It was expanded and republished in four additional editions.

Following the Restoration of the Monarchy in 1660 it was disclosed that Izaak was a staunch Royalist supporter who had aided the Royalists when, at great personal risk, he managed to safeguard one of the Crown Jewels, referred to as the Little George, following Charles II's defeat at the battle of Worcester. Walton was entrusted with returning it to London from where it was smuggled out of the country to Charles II who was then in exile.

His second wife died in 1662, and was buried in Worcester Cathedral, where there is a monument to her memory. One of his daughters married Dr Hawkins, a prebendary of Winchester.

After 1662 he found a home at Farnham Castle with George Morley, Bishop of Winchester, to whom he dedicated his Life of George Herbert and his biography of Richard Hooker. He sometimes visited Charles Cotton in his fishing house on the River Dove.

Walton died, aged 90, in his daughter's house at Winchester on 15 December 1683 and was buried in Winchester Cathedral. You can see his grave and stained glass image in the Chapel of St John the Evangelist and the Fisherman Apostles – visited by anglers from all over the world.

== Works ==
=== The Compleat Angler ===
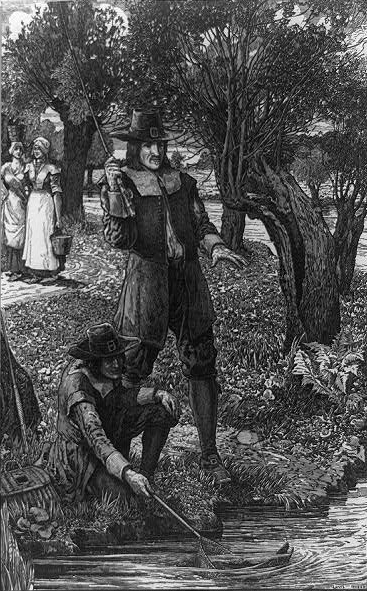
Izaak Walton and his scholar, woodcut by Louis Rhead

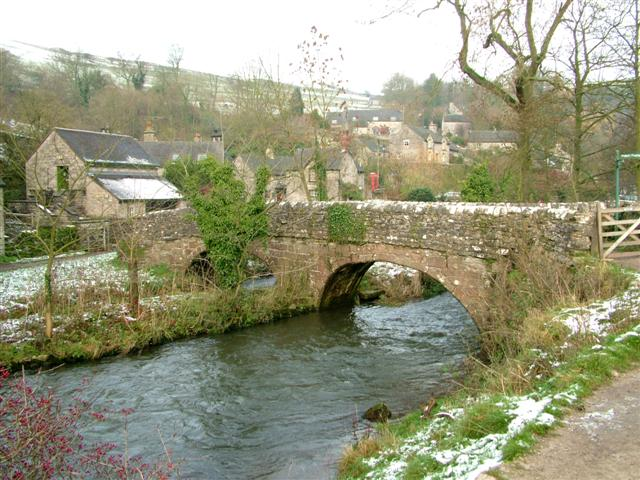
Viator's bridge near Milldale (Peak District) is named for its reference in The Compleat Angler.

The Compleat Angler was first published in 1653, but Walton continued to add to it for a quarter of a century. It is a celebration of the art and spirit of fishing in prose and verse; six verses were quoted from John Dennys's 1613 work The Secrets of Angling. It was dedicated to John Offley, his most honoured friend. There was a second edition in 1655, a third in 1661 (identical with that of 1664), a fourth in 1668 and a fifth in 1676. In this last edition the thirteen chapters of the original had grown to twenty-one, and a second part was added by his friend and brother angler Charles Cotton, who took up Venator where Walton had left him and completed his instruction in fly fishing and the making of flies.

Walton did not profess to be an expert with a fishing fly; the fly fishing in his first edition was contributed by Thomas Barker, a retired cook and humorist, who published a treatise of his own, The Art of Angling in 1651; but in the use of the live worm, the grasshopper and the frog "Piscator" himself could speak as a master. The famous passage about the frog, often misquoted as being about the worm—"use him as though you loved him, that is, harm him as little as you may possibly, that he may live the longer"—appears in the original edition. The additions made as the work grew did not affect the technical part alone; quotations, new turns of phrase, songs, poems and anecdotes were introduced as if the author, who wrote it as a recreation, had kept it constantly in his mind and talked it over point by point with his many friends. There were originally only two interlocutors in the opening scene, "Piscator" and "Viator"; but in the second edition, as if in answer to an objection that "Piscator" had it too much in his own way in praise of angling, he introduced the falconer, "Auceps", changed "Viator" into "Venator" and made the new companions each dilate on the joys of his favourite sport.

The best-known old edition of the Angler is J. Major's (2nd ed., 1824). The book was edited by Andrew Lang in 1896, followed by many other editions.

=== Walton's Lives ===
Walton made significant contributions to seventeenth-century life-writing throughout his career. His leisurely labours as a biographer seem to have grown out of his devotion to angling. It was probably as an angler that he made the acquaintance of Sir Henry Wotton, but it is clear that Walton had more than a love of fishing and a humorous temper to recommend him to Wotton's friendship. At any rate, Wotton, who had intended to write the life of John Donne, and had already corresponded with Walton on the subject, left the task to him. Walton had already contributed an elegy to the 1633 edition of Donne's poems, and he completed and published the life, much to the satisfaction of the most learned critics, in 1640. Sir Henry Wotton dying in 1639, Walton undertook his life also; it was finished in 1642 and published in 1651 as a preface to the volume Reliquiae Wottonianae. His life of Hooker was published in 1665, and his biography of George Herbert in 1670, the latter coinciding with a collected edition of Walton's biographical writings, The Lives of Dr. John Donne, Sir Henry Wotton, Mr. Richard Hooker, Mr. George Herbert (1670, 1675). His life of Bishop Robert Sanderson appeared in 1678. All these subjects were endeared to Walton by a certain gentleness of disposition and cheerful piety; three of them at least—Donne, Wotton and Herbert—were anglers. Walton studied these men's lives in detail, and provides many insights into their character.

=== Other ===
- Sir John Skeffington
- John Chalkhill
- Waltoniana – an 1878 collection of Walton's poems and prose fragments

== Legacy ==
=== Izaak Walton's Cottage ===
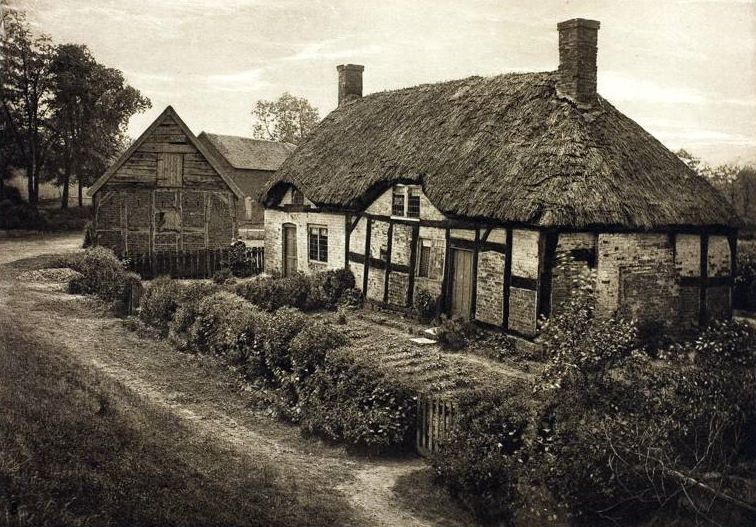
Photogravure of Walton's Shallowford house, 1888

In his will, Walton left his property at Shallowford in Staffordshire for the benefit of the poor of his native town. He had purchased Halfhead Farm there in May 1655. In doing this he was part of a more general retreat of Royalist gentlemen into the English countryside, in the aftermath of the English Civil War, a move summed up by his friend Charles Cotton's well-known poem "The Retirement" (first published in the 5th edition of Walton's Compleat Angler). The cost of Shallowford was £350, and the property included a farmhouse, a cottage, courtyard, garden and nine fields along which a river ran. Part of its attraction may have been that the River Meece, which he mentions in one of his poems, formed part of the boundary. The farm was let to tenants, and Walton kept the excellent fishing.

The cottage is now a Walton Museum. The ground floor of the museum is set-out in period, with information boards covering Walton's life, his writings and the story of the Izaak Walton Cottage. Upstairs a collection of fishing related items is displayed, the earliest dating from the mid-eighteenth century, while a room is dedicated to his Lives and The Compleat Angler. The Izaak Walton Cottage and gardens are open to the public on Sunday afternoons during the summer.

=== Commemorations ===
Advertising mogul and land developer Barron Collier founded the Izaak Walton Fly Fishing Club in 1908 at his Useppa Island resort near Fort Myers, Florida. The Izaak Walton League is an American association formed in 1922 in Chicago, Illinois, to preserve fishing streams. Walton has been inducted into the American National Fresh Water Fishing Hall of Fame. There is a forest preserve in Homewood, Illinois, called the Izaak Walton Forest Preserve. The Izaak Walton Hotel in the Staffordshire village of Ilam overlooks the River Dove, at the entrance to Dovedale. There are also two pubs in England named The Izaak Walton: one in the village of East Meon, Hampshire, the other in Cresswell, Staffordshire. In the county town of Stafford, there is now a statue of him placed in the town park, by the bank of the river. This route through the park was originally known as 'Izaak Walton Walk', there is also a street in the north part of Stafford named after him.

There is a creek named after him in Owatonna, Minnesota. There is also a pub in Norwich named 'The Compleat Angler'. The Compleat Angler Hotel in Bimini, Bahamas, was destroyed by fire in 2006; the hotel bar was frequented by Ernest Hemingway. The Allen-Edmonds shoe company of Port Washington, Wisconsin, produces a "Walton" style in tribute. In the Silver Divide region of the Sierra Nevada mountain range of California, Mount Izaak Walton is named after Izaak Walton. The Izaak Walton State Recreation Site in Sterling, Alaska, is located at the confluence of the Moose River and the Kenai River, and his name is lent to the Izaak Walton Inn in Montana. There is an Izaak Walton Inn in Embu, Kenya, overlooking a small stream that feeds into the Rupingazi River.

=== Non-fiction ===
- Charles Lamb, in his letter to Samuel Taylor Coleridge, recommends The Compleat Angler: "It breathes the very spirit of innocence, purity, and simplicity of the heart. There are many choice old verses interspersed in it; it would sweeten a man's temper at any time to read it; it would Christianise every discordant angry passion; pray make yourself acquainted with it."
- Washington Irving's humorous essay The Angler comments on Walton's popularity; the work is in The Sketch Book of Geoffrey Crayon, Gent..
- Gilbert Ryle uses him in his 1949 book The Concept of Mind as an example of "'knowing how' before 'knowing that'"; in his collected essays he writes that "We certainly can, in respect of many practices, like fishing, cooking and reasoning, extract principles from their applications by people who know how to fish, cook and reason. Hence Isaak Walton, Mrs Beeton and Aristotle. But when we try to express these principles we find that they cannot easily be put in the indicative mood. They fall automatically into the imperative mood."
- Henry David Thoreau mentions him in his 1849 book A week on the Concord and Merrimack rivers, in the chapter "Saturday". Not far into this chapter while floating down the Concord river, just north of the Old North bridge, he and his brother pass a fisherman on the shore, which begins a five-page treatise on fishing and species of fishes. In the treatise he mentions a man from his youth whom he saw frequently fishing on the shore of the Concord, and referred to him as "an old brown coated man who was the Walton of this stream".

=== Fiction ===
- Charles Dickens makes reference to him in chapter 14 of book 2 of A Tale of Two Cities. "The honoured parent steering Northward, had not gone far, when he was joined by another disciple of Izaak Walton, and the two trudged on together."
- Walton is mentioned by Thomas Hardy in his 1891 A Group of Noble Dames, where his relation to fish is compared to the relation of the Petrick family towards the aristocracy.
- Zane Grey mentions him in a fishing passage in his 1903 book Betty Zane on page 84. "Alfred Clark said 'I never knew one [girl] who cared for fishing.'" "Betty Zane answered 'Now you behold one. I love dear old Izaak Walton. Of course you [Clark] have read his book?'"
- Richard Brautigan describes Communists carrying "propaganda posters" in a "trout fishing in America peace parade" with slogans including "ISAAC WALTON [sic] WOULD'VE HATED THE BOMB!" in his 1967 book Trout Fishing in America.
- Donna Tartt references him in The Secret History when the character Bunny writes an essay which over-emphasises his friendship with John Donne.
- Jules Verne references him in The Mysterious Island when the author refers to making fishing lines in the fashion of Izaak Walton.
- David James Duncan employs Walton's The Compleat Angler to comedic effect throughout the early chapters of his novel of fishing and spiritual development, The River Why (1983).
- In the film School Ties (1992) the history teacher refers to Izaak Walton as a personal favourite after mentioning the date of his birth to see if any students knew it.
- A ghostly Walton appears in "Over the Edge" by Peter Wise in Disturbing the Water, a collection of themed original ghost stories set around rivers and lakes.
