= Izaak Walton's Cottage =

Coordinates: 52°51′31″N 2°11′09″W

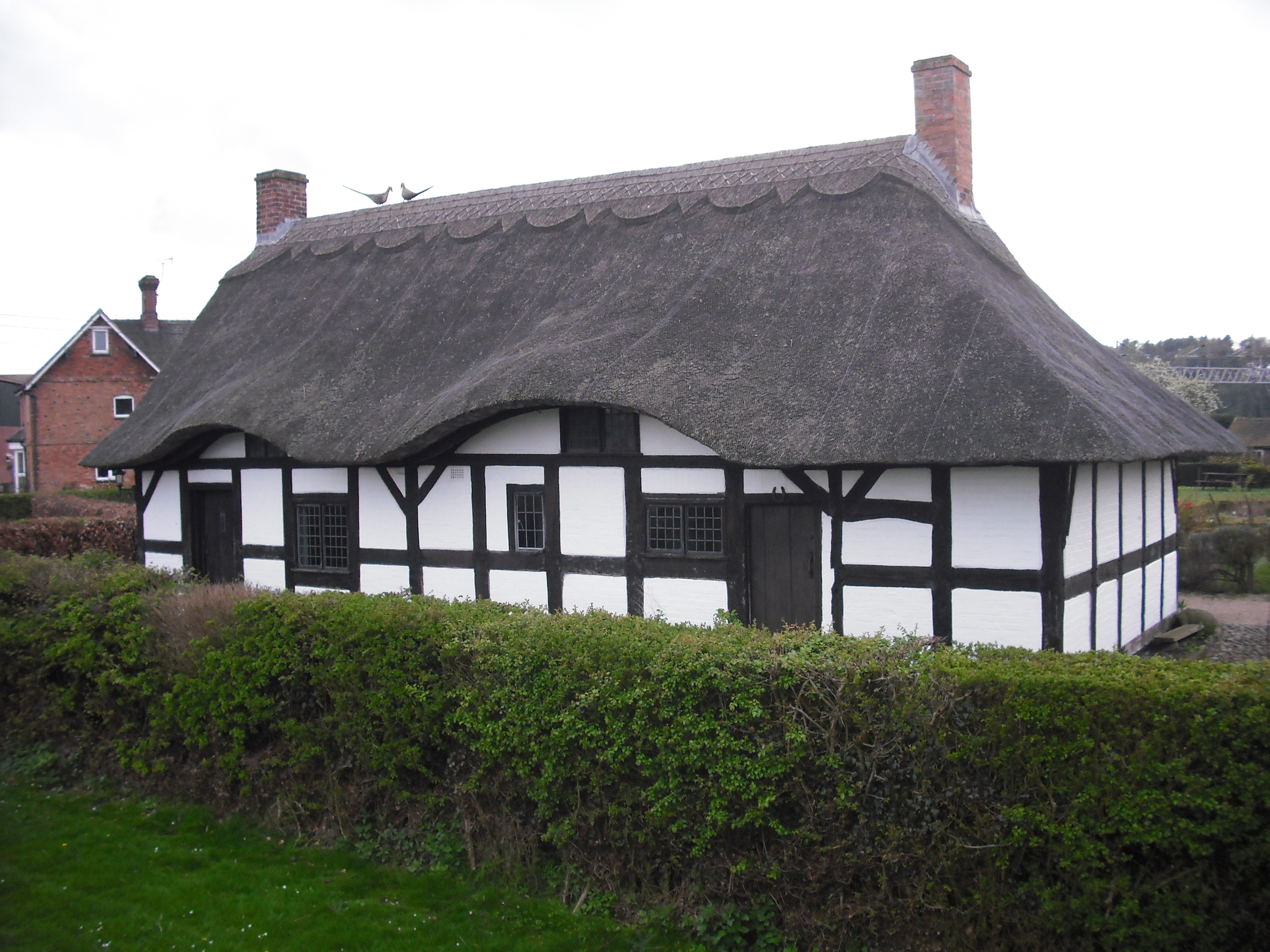
- The cottage in its restored state
- Interactive map of the Izaak Walton's Cottage area

General information
- Architectural style: Vernacular
- Location: England

Listed Building – Grade II
- Designated: 1952
- Reference no.: 1374177

Technical details
- Structural system: Timber framed

Website
- historicstafford.co.uk

The Izaak Walton Cottage is a seventeenth-century timber framed building in Shallowford, Chebsey, Staffordshire, England. It belonged to the writer Izaak Walton, best known for The Compleat Angler. The building is designated grade II, and is managed as a museum.

== History ==
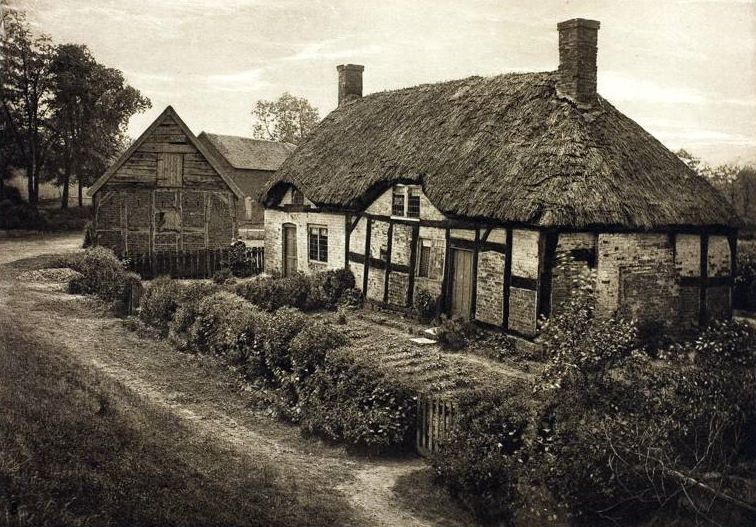
Photogravure of the cottage from 1888

Walton was born in Stafford in 1593. After running a business in London, he acquired some property at Shallowford, including the cottage, in the 1650s. The cottage is near a brook called the Meece (a tributary of the Sow), and the fishing there is believed to be one reason he was attracted to the rural locality. On his death in 1683 he bequeathed the property for the benefit of the poor of Stafford.

The surroundings are still rural, but in 1837 the Grand Junction Railway was built through the valley separating the buildings from a section of the Meece. The farm and the cottage became derelict but continued to be tenanted until 1920 when the property was offered for sale. Local Stafford businessmen formed The Izaak Walton Cottage Trust to establish a small museum dedicated to the famous writer. They raised £50 to purchase the site and £500 to repair the cottage. Lord Stafford ceremonially opened the museum on 30 April 1924. In 1927 sparks from a steam train caused a fire that destroyed the thatched roof, and the museum was closed for a year. There was another fire in 1938, and in 1939 the cottage re-opened with a tiled roof. The building was listed in 1952.

The trust was wound up in 1965, and the building was taken over by Stafford Borough Council. During the 1990s the thatched roof was restored. The ground floor of the museum is set-out in period, with information boards covering Walton's life, his writings and the story of the Izaak Walton Cottage. Upstairs a collection of fishing related items is displayed, the earliest dating from the mid-eighteenth century, while a room is dedicated to his Lives and The Compleat Angler.

== Access ==
The Izaak Walton Cottage and gardens are open to the public on Sunday afternoons during the summer.

== See also ==
- Listed buildings in Chebsey
