= Numark =

Numark may refer to:

- Numark Industries: a company producing and selling DJ equipment
- Numark (pharmacy): a chain of pharmacies in the United Kingdom
- DJ Nu-Mark: DJ and member of hip hop crew Jurassic 5
