= Thomas Sutton (physician) =

Thomas Sutton (1767–1835), a physician in Kent, England, was the first to publish a description of delirium tremens (the "DTs") and to connect the illness to an over indulgence in alcohol.

Sutton was born in Staffordshire, England about 1767. He studied medicine in London, England, Edinburgh, Scotland, and Leiden, The Netherlands, which granted him an M.D. in 1787. He became a Licentiate of the Royal College of Physicians in 1790. He served in the Army and then settled in Greenwich, England to become a consultant at the Kent Dispensary and to practice medicine.

In 1813, Sutton published his book, Tracts on Delirium Tremens, on Peritonitis, and on Some other Internal Inflammatory Affections, and on the Gout. The chapter on delirium tremens contains sixteen case-reports with detailed description of the symptoms and the differential diagnosis from "phrenitis" (another term for delirium) due to inflammation of the brain and from mania. He described the unusual case of a woman not known to be inebriated but he discovered that she frequently imbibed large quantities of Tincture of Lavender, which has an alcohol base. Sutton's treatment for delirium tremens discarded the use of bleeding, an accepted medical method unless the patient was plethoric. Instead, he used opium in sufficient dosage to induce sleep from which the patient awoke improved. He suggested purgation if needed noting that opium may cause a confined bowel state and that blistering appeared to be of no use.

Sutton died at Greenwich in 1835.

== Works ==
- Sutton, Thomas. Dissertatio medica inauguralis de febre intermittente ... [Leyden], Lugduni Batavorum, Fratres Murray, 1787.
- Sutton, Thomas. A Practical Account of a Remittent Fever, Frequently Occurring among the Troops in this Climate. Canterbury, Printed by James Simmons, 1806.
- Sutton, Thomas. Tracts on Delirium Tremens, on Peritonitis, and on Some other Internal Inflammatory Affections, and on the Gout. London, Underwood, 1813. https://archive.org/details/tractsondelirium00sutt
- Sutton, Thomas. "[Case reports]," Edinburgh Medical and Surgical Journal (1813): 318–321.
- Sutton, Thomas. "On the Effects of Temperature in Pulmonary Consumption," The Medical and Physical Journal (1815): 89–97.
- Sutton, Thomas. "On the Influence of Climate in Pulmonary Consumption," The Medical and Physical Journal (1817): 456–466.
- Sutton, Thomas. Abhandlung über das Delirium tremens. Aus dem Englischen übers. von Philipp Heineken. Bremen, Kaiser, 1820.
- Sutton, Thomas. "On the advantages of Milk as a Food in Fever," The London Medical Repository and Review (1822): 194–196.
