= John Chalkhill =

English poet

John Chalkhill (fl. 1600?) was an English poet.

Two songs by him are included in Izaak Walton's Compleat Angler, and in 1683 appeared Thealma and Clearchus. A Pastoral History in smooth and easie Verse. Written long since by John Chalkhill, Esq., an Acquaintant and Friend of Edmund Spencer (1683), with a preface written five years earlier by Walton.

Another poem, Aldilia, Philoparthens Loving Follie (1595, reprinted in vol. X of the Jahrbuch des deutschen Shakespeare-Vereins), was at one time attributed to him. Nothing further is known of the poet, but a person with the same name is recorded as one of the coroners for Middlesex in the later years of Elizabeth I's reign.

George Saintsbury, who included Thealma and Clearchus in vol. II of his Minor Poets of the Caroline Period (Oxford, 1906), points out a marked resemblance between Chalkhill's work and that of William Chamberlayne.
