= Norton Bridge railway station =

Disused railway station in Staffordshire, England

Coordinates: 52°51′57″N 2°11′25″W

Norton Bridge
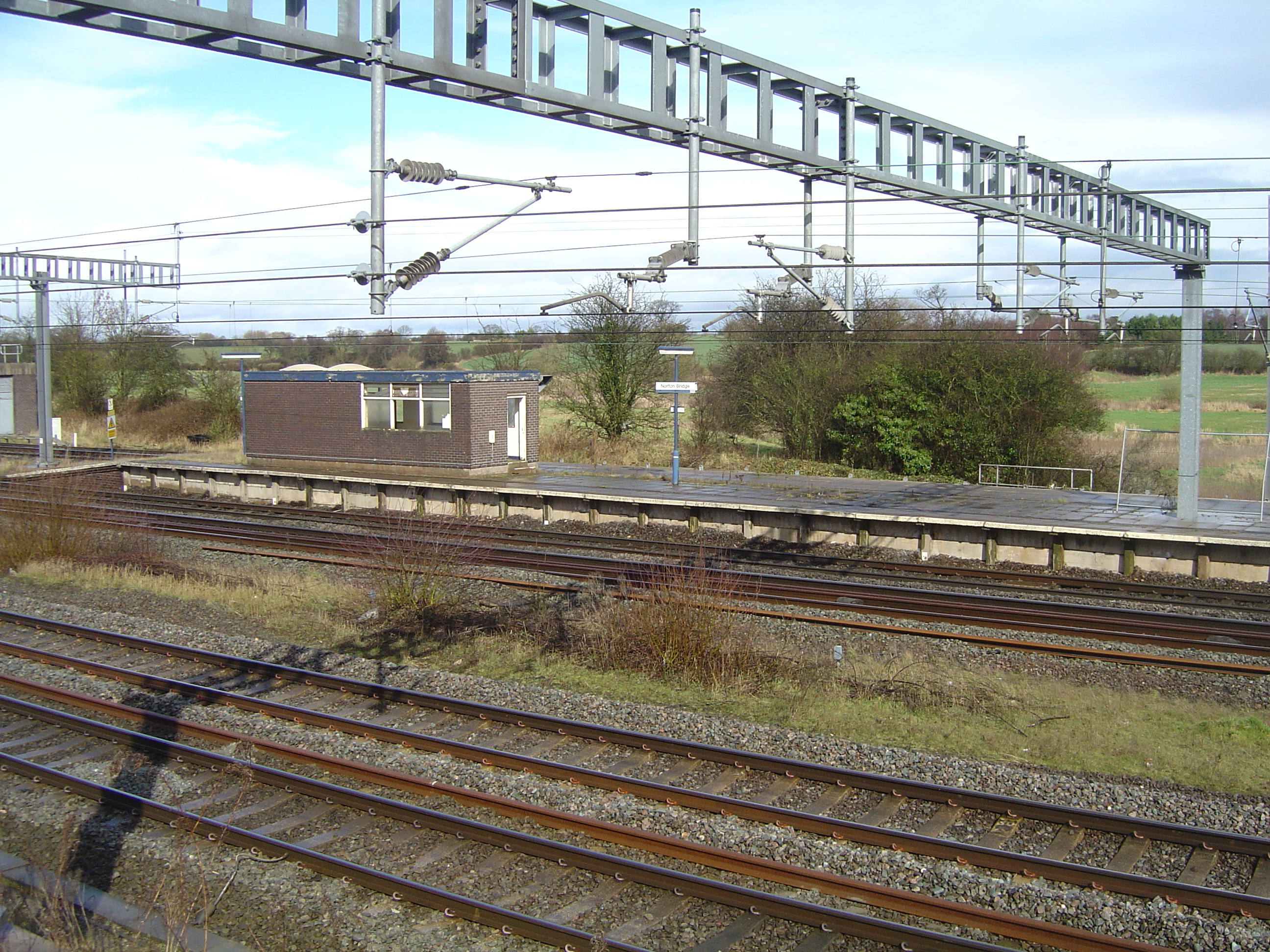
- Norton Bridge in 2009.

General information
- Location: Norton Bridge, Borough of Stafford; England
- Grid reference: SJ872298
- Platforms: originally 4, latterly 2

Other information
- Status: Disused

History
- Original company: Grand Junction Railway
- Pre-grouping: London & North Western Railway
- Post-grouping: London, Midland & Scottish Railway

Key dates
- 4 July 1837: First station opened
- 14 October 1876: Station resited
- 1960s: Main line platforms closed
- 22 May 2004: Last train
- 24 May 2004: Services formally withdrawn
- 10 December 2017: Formally closed

Passengers
- 2002/03: ▼4,793
- 2004/05: ▼2,080
- 2005/06: ▼585
- 2006/07: ▼341
Location
Notes
- Passenger statistics from the Office of Rail and Road

Norton Bridge railway station was a railway station located on the West Coast Main Line and served both the village of Norton Bridge and the town of Eccleshall in Staffordshire, England.

== History ==
The first station was opened by the Grand Junction Railway in 1837. The station was resited southwards in 1876. Services were temporarily withdrawn in 2004 but never reinstated. The station formally closed in 2017.

The main line platforms were removed before electrification in the 1960s when the current island platform was built for Manchester-via-Stoke-on-Trent services. Passenger services ceased in May 2004 when Central Trains services between Stafford and Stoke-on-Trent were withdrawn and replaced by BakerBus route X1. In December 2004 the footbridge was removed in order to improve freight clearances.

From 2007, the Office of Rail Regulation did not include it in its station usage figures.

The nearby junction between the Crewe and Stoke routes is an important one on the West Coast Main Line; as such, during the 1960s modernisation of the line, the junction and some of the surrounding main lines were placed under the control of a new power signal box built to a design similar to that still standing at Wolverhampton. The Norton Bridge signal box was notable for its use of an experimental Westinghouse solid-state interlocking system for some years, which was later converted to a conventional relay-based interlocking; this signal box features briefly in the British Transport Films production Thirty Million Letters. It closed altogether in 2004, control passing instead to the signal control centre at Stoke-on-Trent, although the lower storey still remains in situ as a relay room.

In March 2016, a flyover was opened to the north of the station to allow the Stoke branch to be fully grade-separated from the main line to Crewe. Services to/from Manchester now use the slow lines from Stafford, a new junction near Little Bridgeford and the new flyover instead of having to make potentially conflicting moves across the flat junction as before.

In October 2016, the Department for Transport began a consultation process to formally close the station and withdraw its subsidy of the replacement bus service operated by D&G Bus. The notional closure took effect on 10 December 2017, coinciding with the transfer of the West Midlands franchise from London Midland to West Midlands Trains. However, the bus subsidy continued to give Staffordshire County Council time to decide on the future of the service. With the council electing not to take over the funding of the service, it ceased in March 2019.

== See also ==
- West Coast Main Line route modernisation

Preceding station	Historical railways	Following station
Stafford; Line and station open	Central Trains; Stafford to Manchester Line	Stone; Line and station open
Bridgeford; Line open, station closed	London & North Western Railway; Grand Junction Railway	Standon Bridge; Line open, station closed
