= Bristan =

British brand of plumbing products

Bristan is a brand of plumbing products in the United Kingdom, mainly found in bathroom fittings. It is also the name of the parent company, Bristan Group.

== History ==
The company was formed in 1977 by two people with first names Brian and Stan, combining the two to form Bristan. It began by selling taps and showers to DIY chains, mainly the now defunct Texas Homecare. It claims to be the UK's number one brand for bathroom taps and showers.

In 1997 it had a management buyout (MBO). In 2004 it was bought by US-headquartered Masco, who combined it with other companies to form Bristan Group.

== Location ==
Bristan Group also owns Heritage Bathrooms. Both Bristan and Heritage Bathrooms are situated on the Birch Coppice Business Park in Dordon in North Warwickshire, off the A5 (Watling Street), and a mile east of junction 10 (Tamworth) of the M42. The southern part of the industrial estate is in Baddesley Ensor, and the whole site is the former Baddesley Colliery, with an adjoining railway line still there.

The parent company of Bristan Group is Masco, headquartered in Livonia, Michigan.

== Executives ==
Bristan Group's Chief Executive is Jeremy Ling, who was appointed in August 2009. The Chairman and former Chief Executive until 2008, Steve Lee, left in June 2010.

== Products ==
- Tap (valve)
- Showers
