= Norton Bridge, Staffordshire =

Village in Staffordshire, England

Coordinates: 52°52′N 2°12′W

Norton Bridge
- Location within Staffordshire
- District: Stafford
- Shire county: Staffordshire
- Region: West Midlands
- Country: England
- Sovereign state: United Kingdom
- Post town: Stone
- Postcode district: ST15
- Police: Staffordshire
- Fire: Staffordshire
- Ambulance: West Midlands
- UK Parliament: Stafford

Norton Bridge is a village in Staffordshire, England. Until May 2004 it was served by Norton Bridge railway station.

== Amenities ==
At present, Norton Bridge has very few amenities for residents. There is a children's park which has been recently upgraded. In addition to the park there is St Luke's which is a small church/village hall and a postbox. Also, Norton Bridge's only public house, "The Railway Inn" has now reopened and serves locally brewed beer.

== Norton Bridge rail crash ==
The Norton Bridge rail crash occurred on 16 October 2003. An intermodal train hauled by two Freightliner Class 86 (86631 and 86611) locomotives collided with another stationary freight train, after passing a red signal. The cabs of the leading locomotive were badly damaged but the driver escaped with only minor injuries, although he had to be cut from the wreckage by the fire brigade.

== Norton Bridge Junction ==
Norton Bridge Junction is where trains towards Stoke-on-Trent and Manchester Piccadilly are routed away from the West Coast Main Line. The primary uses of this route are the West Midlands Trains service from London Euston to Crewe via Stoke-on-Trent and the CrossCountry services between the South Coast and Southwest and Manchester Piccadilly via Birmingham New Street. No regular freight service uses this route.

In 2014 construction commenced on a scheme which takes the form of a diversionary route and flyover. The new route commences just north of Great Bridgeford and runs slightly west of the West Coast Main Line. The route then swings eastward on a new flyover located just north of the present Norton Bridge Junction to rejoin the existing route to Stoke-on-Trent. The new junction was commissioned over the Easter 2016 weekend, 18 months ahead of schedule.

== See also ==
- Listed buildings in Chebsey
- List of rail accidents in the United Kingdom
- West Coast Main Line route modernisation
