= Chebsey =

Village in Staffordshire, England

Coordinates: 52°51′20″N 2°12′33″W

- Location within Staffordshire
- Population: 556 (2011 Census)
- District: Stafford
- Shire county: Staffordshire
- Region: West Midlands
- Country: England
- Sovereign state: United Kingdom
- Post town: Stafford
- Postcode district: ST21
- Police: Staffordshire
- Fire: Staffordshire
- Ambulance: West Midlands
- UK Parliament: Stafford

Chebsey is a small village in Staffordshire 2.5 miles southeast of Eccleshall on a confluence of Eccleshall water and the River Sow some 5 miles northwest of Stafford. The population of the civil parish at the 2011 census was 566. It comprises a number of houses and cottages and a village church dedicated to All Saints.

== All Saints’ Church ==
Standing above the village on a natural mound of higher ground, the church is mostly built from reddish sandstone in the Gothic style and dates from the 12th century. The west tower dates from the 15th century, and is constructed from mostly grey with some red sandstone blocks. The external staircase turret (on the southeast corner of the tower) at Chebsey, is quite an unusual feature. Though it is very common in the churches of the South of England and especially those of Devon and Somerset, yet it is rarely seen in churches of the English Midlands and North of England. Parts of the south wall of the church show signs of extensive repairs, mostly in red sandstone. The churchyard contains an Anglo-Saxon cross shaft. Inside the church can be found late Victorian stained glass windows by Charles Eamer Kempe, and a 13th-century stone coffin. The church was extensively renovated in 1897 under the supervision of Staffordshire ecclesiastical architect Andrew Capper.

The churchyard contains the war graves of a soldier of World War I and an airman of World War II.

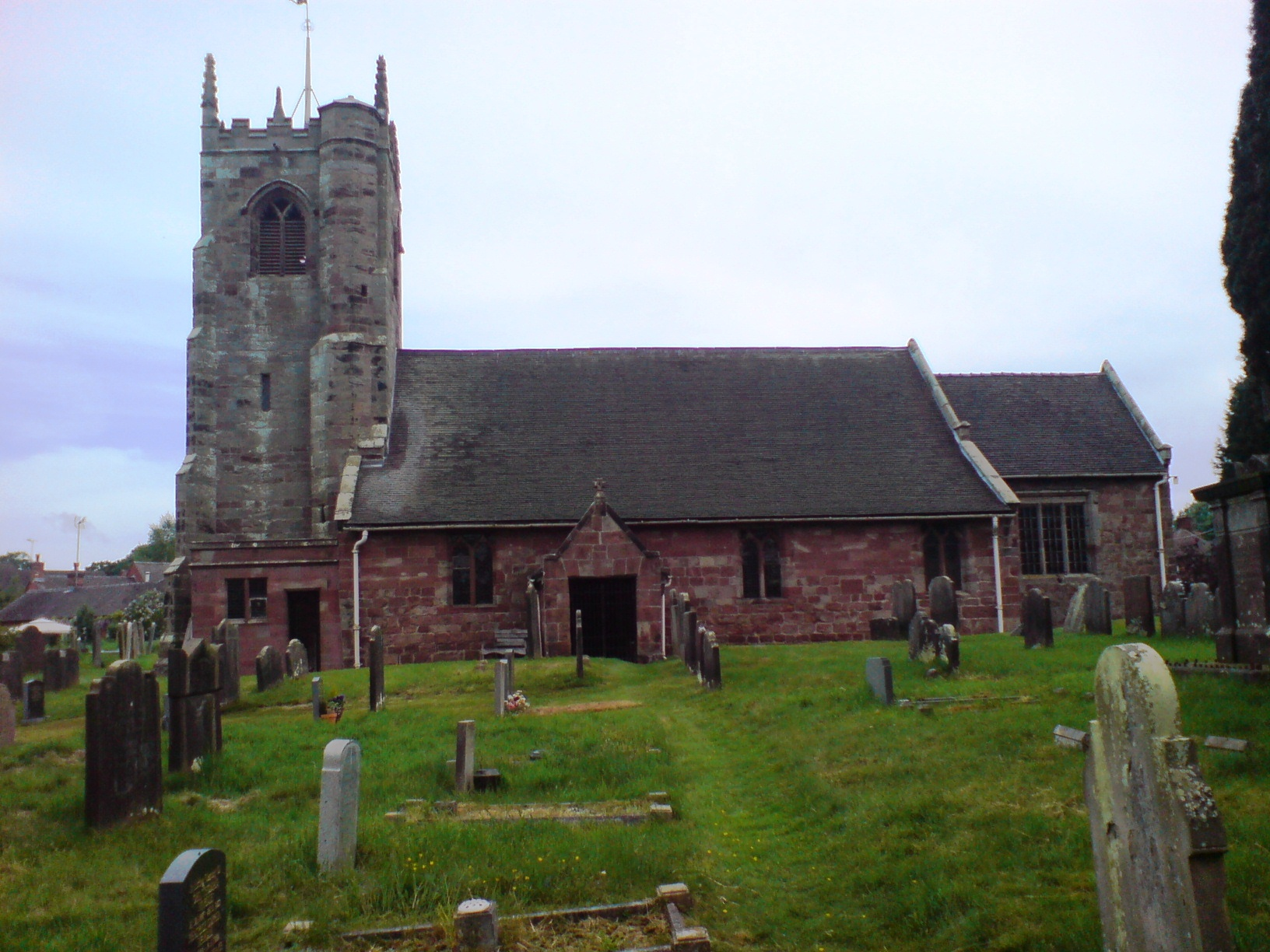
All Saints’ Church, Chebsey viewed from the south, and showing the unusual external staircase turret running up the southeast corner of the west tower, May 2008

== Notable people ==
- Margaret de Clare (1293–1342 in Chebsey) an English noblewoman, heiress, and the second-eldest of the three daughters of Gilbert de Clare, 6th Earl of Hertford, making her a granddaughter of King Edward I of England.
- Sir William Stafford of Chebsey (c.1500–1556) courtier and Essex landowner and the second husband of Mary Boleyn, the sister of Anne Boleyn. They married in secret in 1534 and initially lived at Chebsey
- Richard Garnett (1789–1850) an English philologist (historical linguist), author and librarian at the British Museum. In 1836 he was presented to the living of Chebsey which he relinquished in 1838.

== See also ==
- Listed buildings in Chebsey
