= Staffordshire =

County of England

- Non-metropolitan and ceremonial county
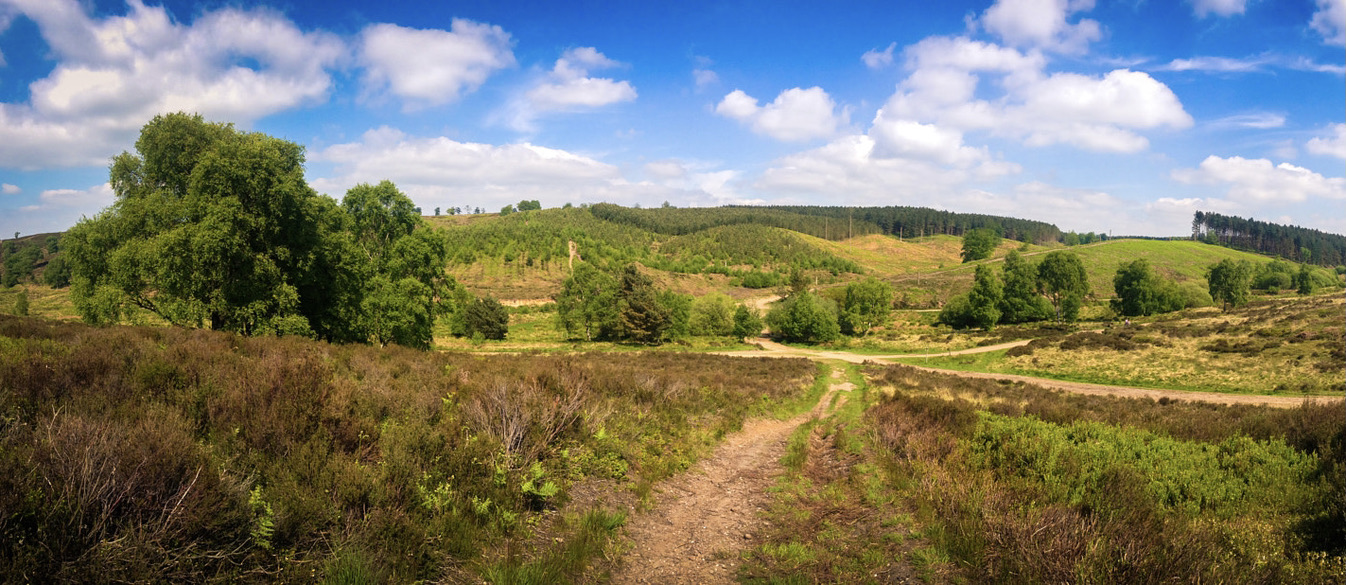
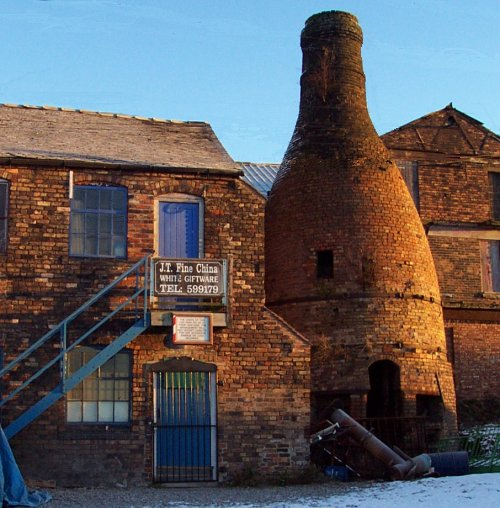
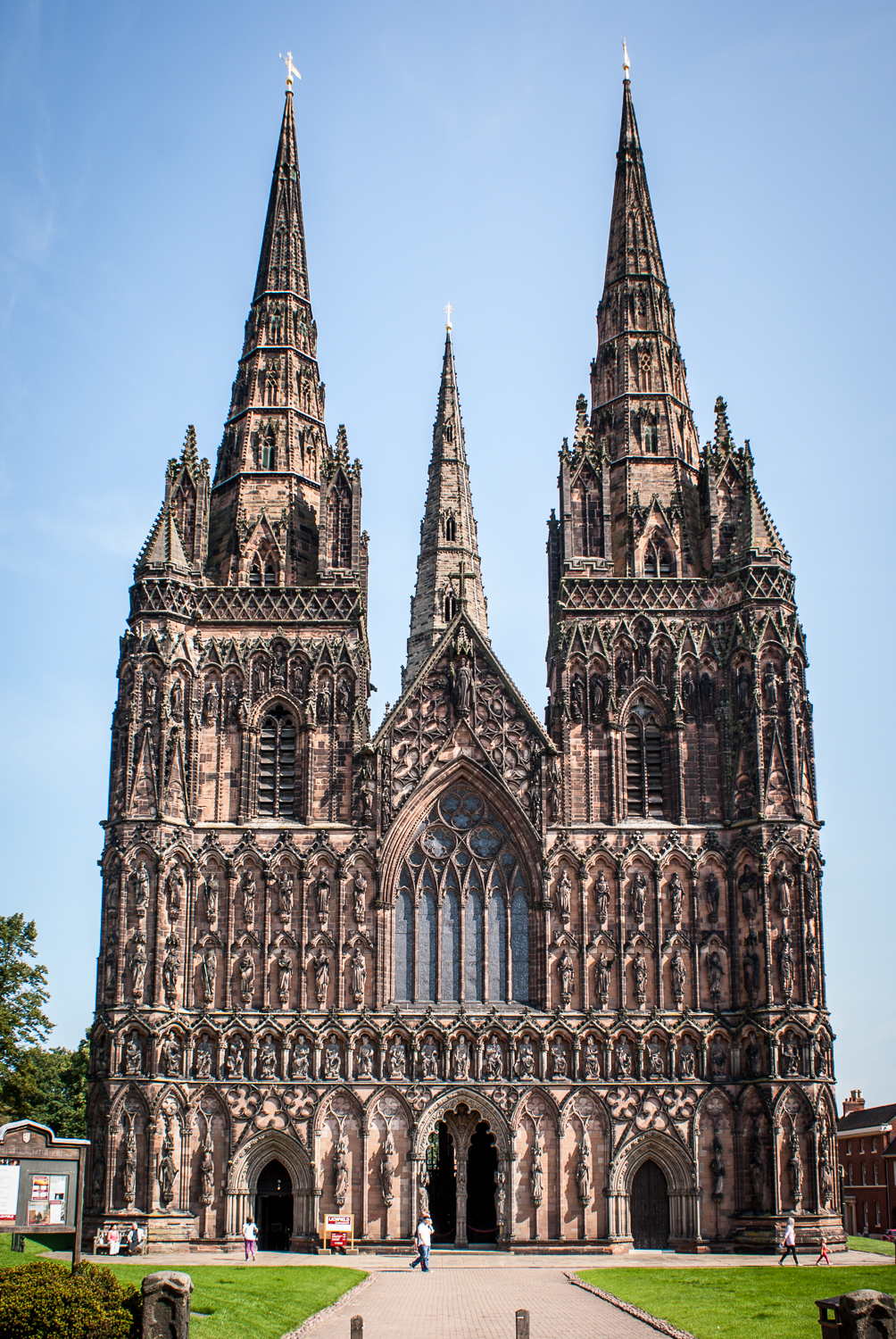
- The Sherbrook Valley in Cannock Chase; a bottle kiln in Longton, Stoke-on-Trent; and Lichfield Cathedral

- Staffordshire shown within England
- Coordinates: 52°48′25″N 02°06′58″W
- Sovereign state: United Kingdom
- Constituent country: England
- Region: West Midlands
- Established: Ancient
- Time zone: UTC+0 (GMT)
  - Summer (DST): UTC+1 (BST)
- UK Parliament: List of MPs
- Police: Staffordshire Police
- Ceremonial county
- Lord Lieutenant: Professor Elizabeth Barnes
- High Sheriff: Pritpal Singh Nagi
- Area: 2,714 km^{2} (1,048 sq mi)
  - Rank: 18th of 48
- Population (2024): 1,177,578
  - Rank: 17th of 48
  - Density: 434/km^{2} (1,120/sq mi)
- Non-metropolitan county
- County council: Staffordshire County Council
- Control: Reform UK
- Admin HQ: Stafford
- Area: 2,620 km^{2} (1,010 sq mi)
  - Rank: 11th of 21
- Population (2024): 907,153
  - Rank: 9th of 21
  - Density: 346/km^{2} (900/sq mi)
- ISO 3166-2: GB-STS
- GSS code: E10000028
- ITL: UKG24
- Website: staffordshire.gov.uk
- Districts
- Districts of Staffordshire; Unitary County council area
- Districts: List: Stoke-on-Trent; Newcastle-under-Lyme; Staffordshire Moorlands; Stafford; East Staffordshire; South Staffordshire; Cannock Chase; Lichfield; Tamworth

Staffordshire (/ˈstæfərdʃɪər, -ʃər/; postal abbreviation Staffs.) is a ceremonial county in the West Midlands of England. It borders Cheshire to the north-west, Derbyshire and Leicestershire to the east, Warwickshire to the south-east, the West Midlands county and Worcestershire to the south, and Shropshire to the west. The largest settlement is the city of Stoke-on-Trent.

The county has an area of 1,713 square kilometres (661 sq mi) and had an estimated population of 1,177,578 in 2024. Stoke-on-Trent is in the north of the county, and the town of Newcastle-under-Lyme immediately to the west. Stafford is in the centre, Burton upon Trent in the east, and Tamworth and the city of Lichfield in the south-east. For local government purposes Staffordshire comprises a non-metropolitan county, with eight districts, plus the unitary authority area of Stoke-on-Trent. The county historically included the north-west of the West Midlands county, including Walsall, West Bromwich, and Wolverhampton.

Staffordshire is hilly to the north and south. The southern end of the Pennines is in the north, containing part of the Peak District National Park. The Cannock Chase AONB and parts of the National Forest and Kinver Edge are in the south. The River Trent and its tributaries drain most of the county. From its source, near Biddulph, the river flows through Staffordshire in a southwesterly direction, meeting the Sow just east of Stafford; it then meets the River Tame and turns north-east, exiting into Derbyshire immediately downstream of Burton upon Trent.

Staffordshire contains a number of Iron Age tumuli and Roman camps, and was settled by the Angles in the sixth century; the oldest Stafford knot, the county's symbol, can be seen on an Anglian cross in the churchyard of Stoke Minster. The county was formed in the early tenth century, when Stafford became the capital of Mercia. The county was relatively settled in the following centuries, and rapidly industrialised during the Industrial Revolution, when the North Staffordshire coalfield was exploited and fuelled the iron and automobilie industries in the south of the county. Pottery is the county's most famous export; a limited amount is still produced in Stoke-on-Trent.

== History ==
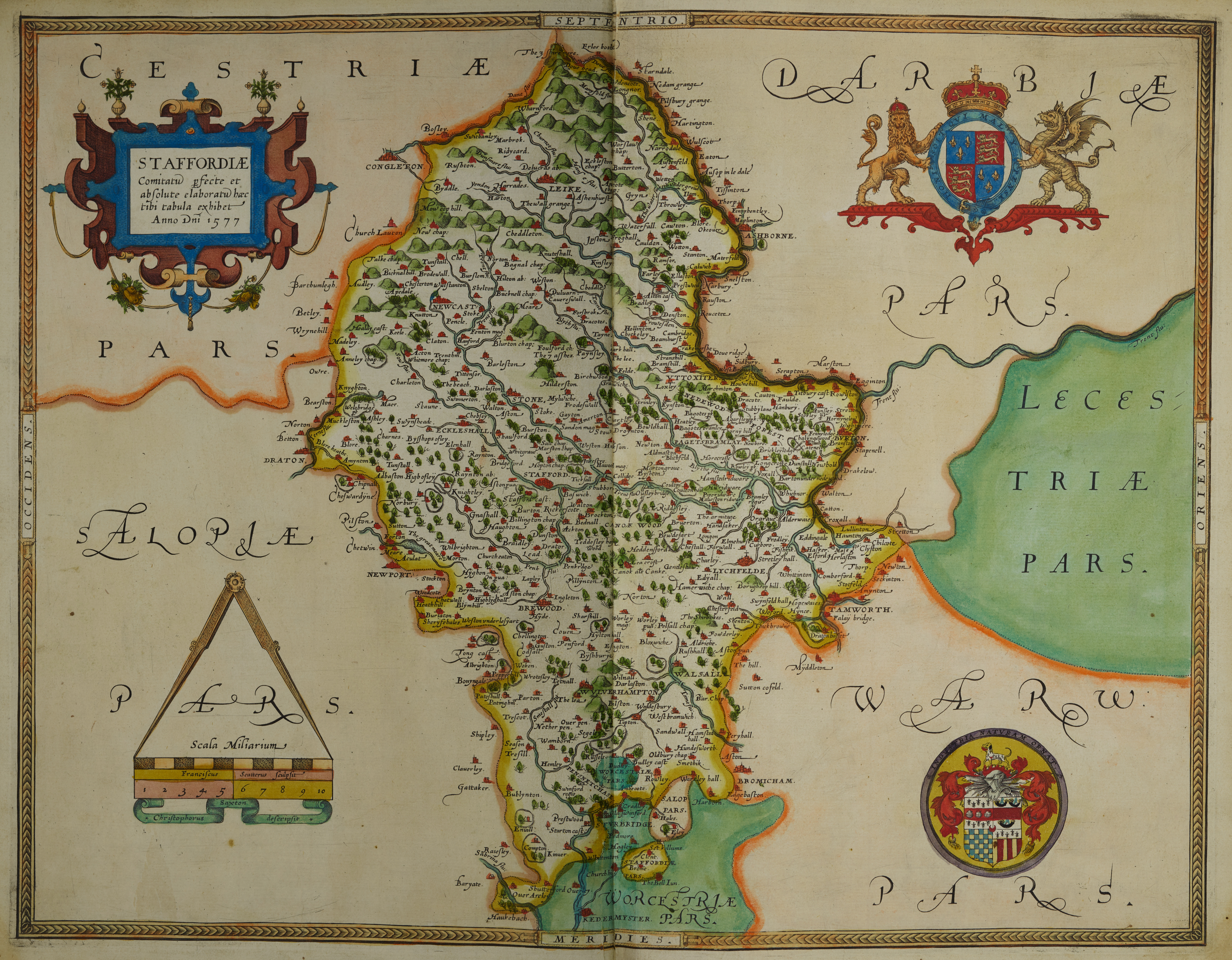
Hand-drawn map of Stafford by Christopher Saxton from 1577

The flag of the historic county of Staffordshire

Historically, Staffordshire was divided into five hundreds: Cuttlestone, Offlow, Pirehill, Seisdon, and Totmonslow.

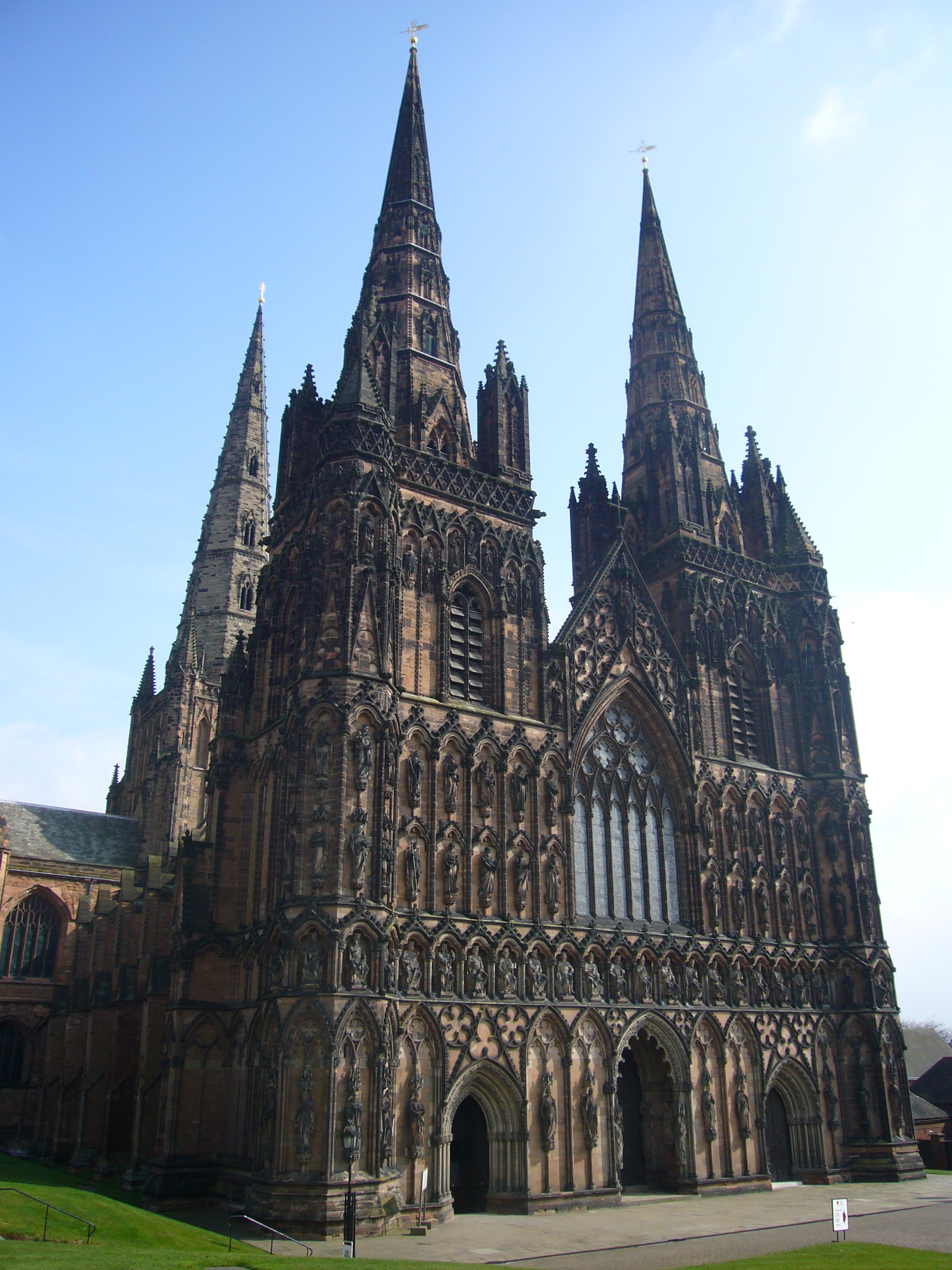
Lichfield Cathedral

The historic boundaries of Staffordshire cover much of what is now the metropolitan county of West Midlands. An administrative county of Staffordshire was set up in 1889 under the Local Government Act 1888 covering the county, except for the county boroughs of Wolverhampton, Walsall, and West Bromwich in the south (the area known as the Black Country), and Hanley in the north. The Act also saw the towns of Tamworth (partly in Warwickshire) and Burton upon Trent (partly in Derbyshire) united entirely in Staffordshire. In 1553, Queen Mary made Lichfield a county corporate, meaning it was administered separately from the rest of Staffordshire, remaining so until 1888.

Handsworth and Perry Barr became part of the county borough of Birmingham, and thus Warwickshire, in 1911 and 1928 respectively. Burton, in the east of the county, became a county borough in 1901, and was followed by Smethwick, another town in the Black Country in 1907. In 1910 the six towns of the Staffordshire Potteries, including Hanley, became the single county borough of Stoke-on-Trent.

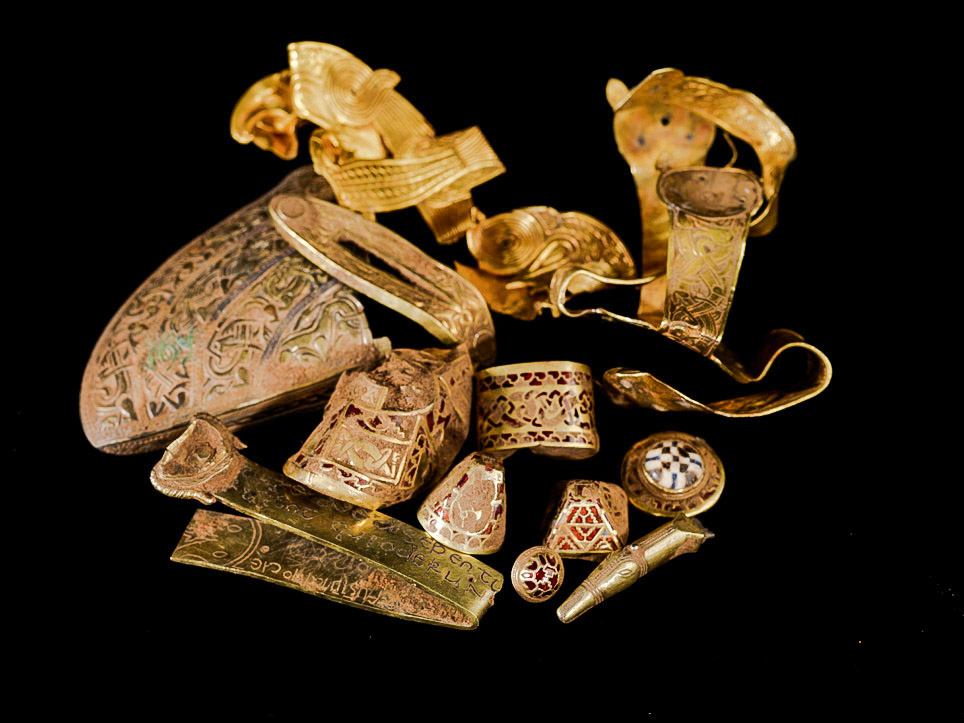
The Staffordshire Hoard, discovered in a field near Lichfield in July 2009, is perhaps the most important collection of Anglo-Saxon objects found in England.

A significant boundary change occurred in 1926 when the east of Sedgley was transferred to Worcestershire to allow the construction of the new Priory Estate on land purchased by Dudley County Borough council.

A major reorganisation in the Black Country in 1966, under the recommendation of the Local Government Commission for England, led to the creation of an area of contiguous county boroughs. The County Borough of Warley was formed by the merger of the county borough of Smethwick and municipal borough of Rowley Regis with the Worcestershire borough of Oldbury: the resulting county borough was associated with Worcestershire. Meanwhile, the county borough of Dudley, historically a detached part of Worcestershire, expanded and became associated with Staffordshire instead. This reorganisation led to the administrative county of Staffordshire having a thin protrusion passing between the county boroughs (to the east) and Shropshire, to the west, to form a short border with Worcestershire.

Under the Local Government Act 1972, on 1 April 1974, the county boroughs of the Black Country and the Aldridge-Brownhills Urban District of Staffordshire became, along with Birmingham, Solihull, and Coventry and other districts, a new metropolitan county of West Midlands. County boroughs were abolished, with Stoke becoming a non-metropolitan district in Staffordshire, and Burton forming an unparished area in the district of East Staffordshire. On 1 April 1997, under a recommendation of the Banham Commission, Stoke-on-Trent became a unitary authority independent of Staffordshire once more.

In July 2009, the largest hoard of Anglo-Saxon gold ever found in Britain was discovered in a field near Lichfield. The artefacts, known as The Staffordshire Hoard, have tentatively been dated to the 7th or 8th centuries, placing the origin of the items in the time of the Kingdom of Mercia.

== Education ==
Staffordshire has a completely comprehensive system with eight independent schools. Most secondary schools are from 11 to 16 or 18, but two in Staffordshire Moorlands and South Staffordshire are from 13 to 18. Resources are shared where appropriate.

There are two universities in the county, Keele University, west of Newcastle-under-Lyme, and the University of Staffordshire, which has campuses in Stoke-on-Trent, Stafford, London, Lichfield and Shrewsbury.

== Sport ==
The modern county of Staffordshire currently has three professional football clubs – Stoke City and Port Vale, both from Stoke-on-Trent, and Burton Albion, who play in Burton upon Trent.

Stoke City, one of the oldest professional football clubs in existence, was founded in 1863 and played at the Victoria Ground for 119 years from 1878 until its relocation to the Britannia Stadium (now named the Bet365 Stadium) in 1997. They were among the 12 founder members of the Football League in 1888. By the late 1930s, they were established First Division members and boasted arguably the finest footballer in England at the time in right-winger Stanley Matthews, who had two spells with the club between 1930 and his retirement in 1965 at the age of 50. In 1972, the club finally won a major trophy when they lifted the Football League Cup, but after relegation from the First Division in 1985 they would not experience top flight football for 23 years. After spending some two decades bouncing between the second and third tiers of the English league, they finally reclaimed their top flight status in 2008 by securing promotion to the Premier League. Stoke City reached their first FA Cup final in 2011, but lost 1–0 to Manchester City.

Port Vale, who like Stoke City play in Stoke-on-Trent, was formed in 1876 and became members of the Football League in 1892. After more than 70 years at various stadiums around the city, the club moved to its present home, Vale Park, in 1950. In early 1936, they had eliminated First Division champions Sunderland from the FA Cup. Another FA Cup success came in February 1988 when they eliminated seven-time winners Tottenham Hotspur from the competition. Promotion to the Second Division for the first time since the 1960s was secured in 1989, and Vale would spend nine of the next 11 years at this level. However, the club has been less successful since the turn of the 21st century, and suffered relegation to League Two – the fourth tier of the English league – in 2008. The club has seen an upturn in its fortunes as the club was promoted to League One in the 2012–13 season. In the 2016–17 season Port Vale were relegated back to League Two.

West Bromwich Albion, Wolverhampton Wanderers and Walsall are also notable clubs based in the historic county boundaries.

The county's other professional football team is Burton Albion, based in Burton upon Trent, who currently play in League One.

The county has a number of non-league football clubs, including Tamworth, Stafford Rangers, Hednesford Town, Chasetown and Leek Town.

In cricket, Staffordshire is one of the nineteen Minor counties of English and Welsh cricket. It is represented in Minor counties cricket by Staffordshire County Cricket Club who have played in the Minor Counties Championship since 1895, a competition which it has won outright eleven times, making it the most successful Minor counties team. Famous international cricketers produced by the county include Sydney Barnes, Bob Taylor and Dominic Cork, all of whom went on to represent England.

== Geography ==
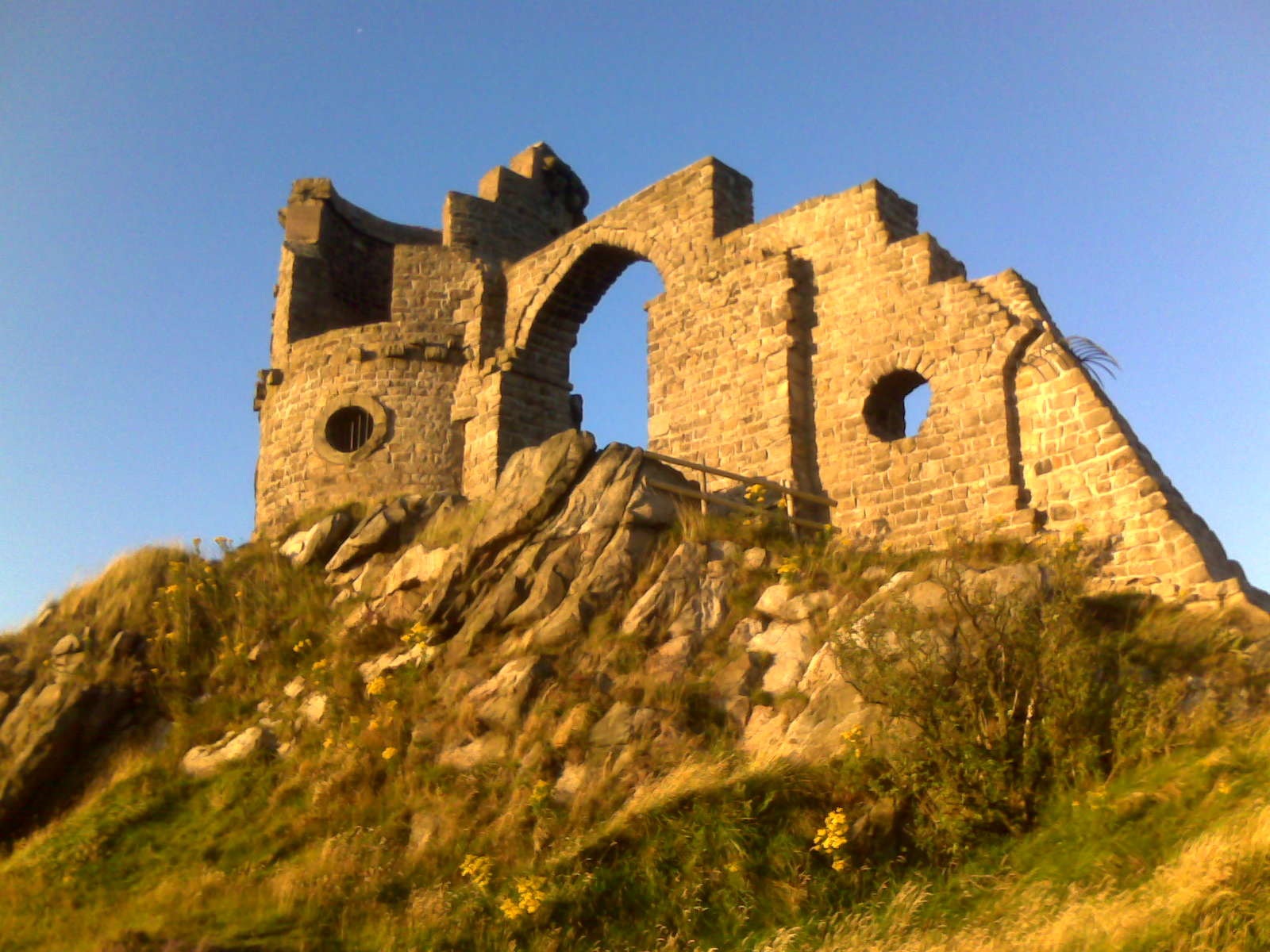
Mow Cop Castle on the Cheshire border

In the north and in the south, the county is hilly, with the southern foothills and uplands of the Pennines in the north, with parts of it in the Peak District National Park. Most of the northern upland terrain is in the Staffordshire Moorlands district. Cannock Chase, an area of natural beauty, and parts of the National Forest and Kinver Edge are in the south. In the middle regions, the landscape is low and undulating. In parts of the county are once significant coalfields, including the South Staffordshire coalfield. In the southern part, there are also rich iron ore deposits. The soil is chiefly clay and agriculture was not highly developed until the mechanisation of farms.

Staffordshire is home to the highest village in Britain, Flash. The village, in the Staffordshire Moorlands, stands at 1,519 ft (463 m) above sea level. This record was confirmed in 2007 by the Ordnance Survey after Wanlockhead in Scotland also claimed the record. The BBC's The One Show investigated the case in a bid to settle the argument and Flash was confirmed as the higher of the two. The highest point in Staffordshire is Cheeks Hill. The largest river is the River Trent, which drains most of the county along with its tributaries. From its source, near Biddulph, the Trent flows through Staffordshire in a southwesterly direction and meets the River Sow just east of Stafford. It then meets the River Tame and turns north-east, exiting into Derbyshire immediately downstream of Burton upon Trent.

=== Green belt ===
Staffordshire contains sectors of three green belt areas, two of which surround the large conurbations of Stoke-on-Trent and the West Midlands, and were first drawn up from the 1950s. All the county's districts contain some portion of belt.

== Demographics ==
According to the 2001 Census the population of the non-metropolitan Staffordshire is 806,744 and the population of Stoke-on-Trent was 240,636 making a total population of 1,047,380. In non-metropolitan Staffordshire, White British is the largest ethnicity, making up 96% of the population. This is followed by Irish, making up 0.6%. Non-White citizens make up 2% of the population. The largest non-White ethnic group are British Pakistanis. 94% of the population was born in England, and those born in Scotland and Wales together make up 1% of the total population.

== Economy ==
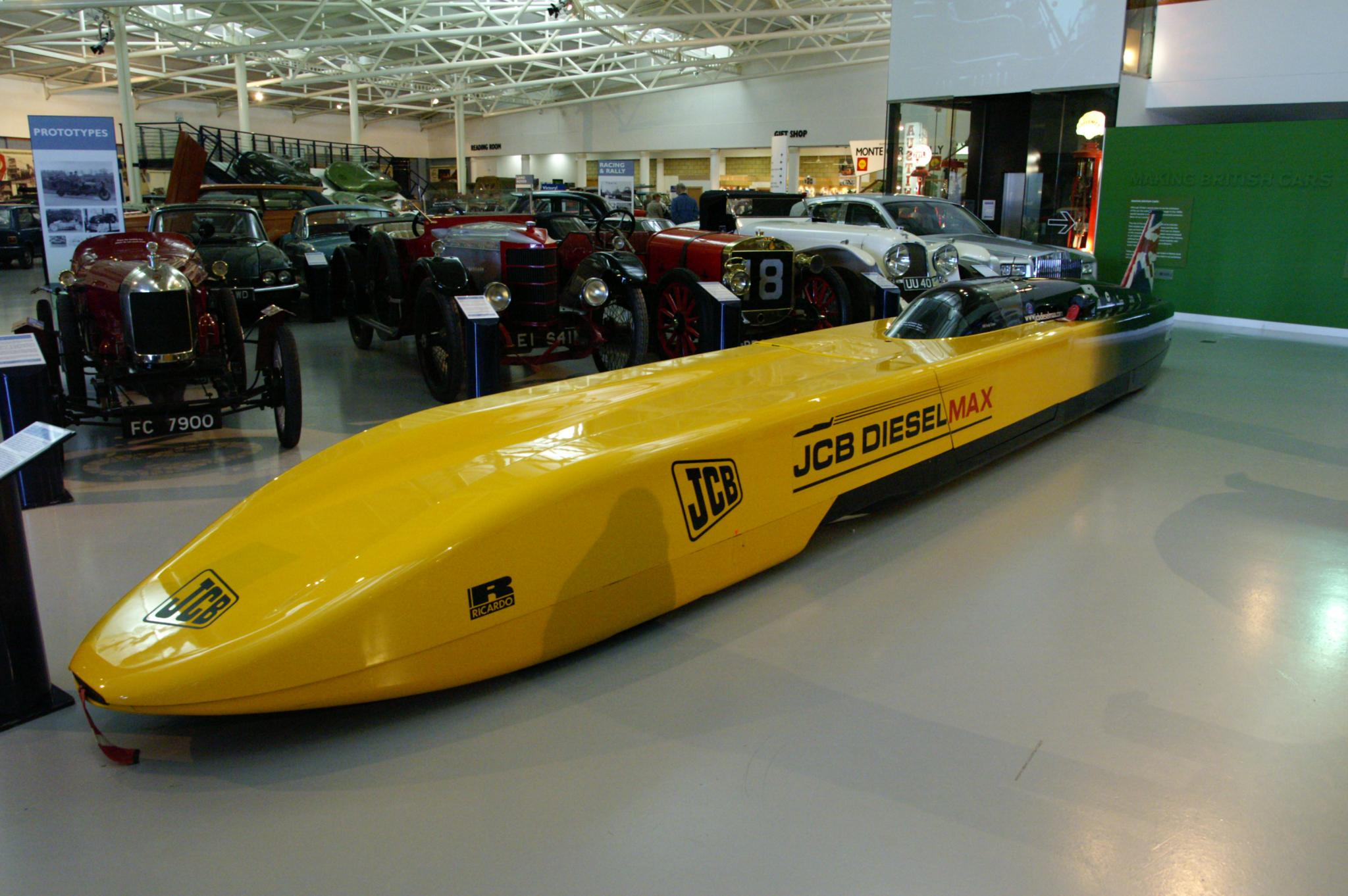
JCB Dieselmax, holder of the land speed record for diesel-engined vehicles

The brewing companies such as Coors Brewers are in Burton on Trent, as well as Marmite, Marston's Brewery, GNC UK (health supplements). Branston is the original home of Branston Pickle, where the original factory can still be seen on Burton Road. Spirit Pub Company is near the A5121/A38 junction, with Punch Taverns slightly further north.

Newell Rubbermaid UK (owner of Parker Pen, Berol, Paper Mate and DYMO), a large RDC of Tesco, and Zytek (motorsport) is at Fradley Park, on an old airfield. Norgren was an international pneumatic technology company on Eastern Avenue, Lichfield.

Michelin Tyres are made at Sideway in Stoke-on-Trent. Royal Doulton and Wedgwood were/are based at Burslem and Barlaston respectively. Portmeirion Pottery, which owns the Royal Worcester brand, is in Stoke. Steelite International (pottery) is based at Middleport, in west Burslem, next to the Trent and Mersey Canal. Wade Ceramics is at Etruria to the east of Wolstanton, near the HQ of The Sentinel newspaper (Harmsworth Printing). Premier Foods make Mr Kipling slices and Cherry Bakewells at Trent Vale in the south of Stoke-on-Trent.

Bet365 is situated at Festival Park in Etruria, and is Stoke-on-Trent's largest private sector employer. Dechra Pharmaceuticals makes veterinary pharmaceuticals at Talke. Churchill China is at Sandyford near Tunstall. Sumitomo Electrical Wiring Systems (Europe), which supplies wiring for the automotive industry, is at Silverdale. At Kidsgrove, Converteam make variable speed drives (VSDs); AAH Pharmaceuticals has its Enterprise and Trident divisions in Talke, in the west of Kidsgrove. Andritz UK is at Wolstanton, in the north of Newcastle.

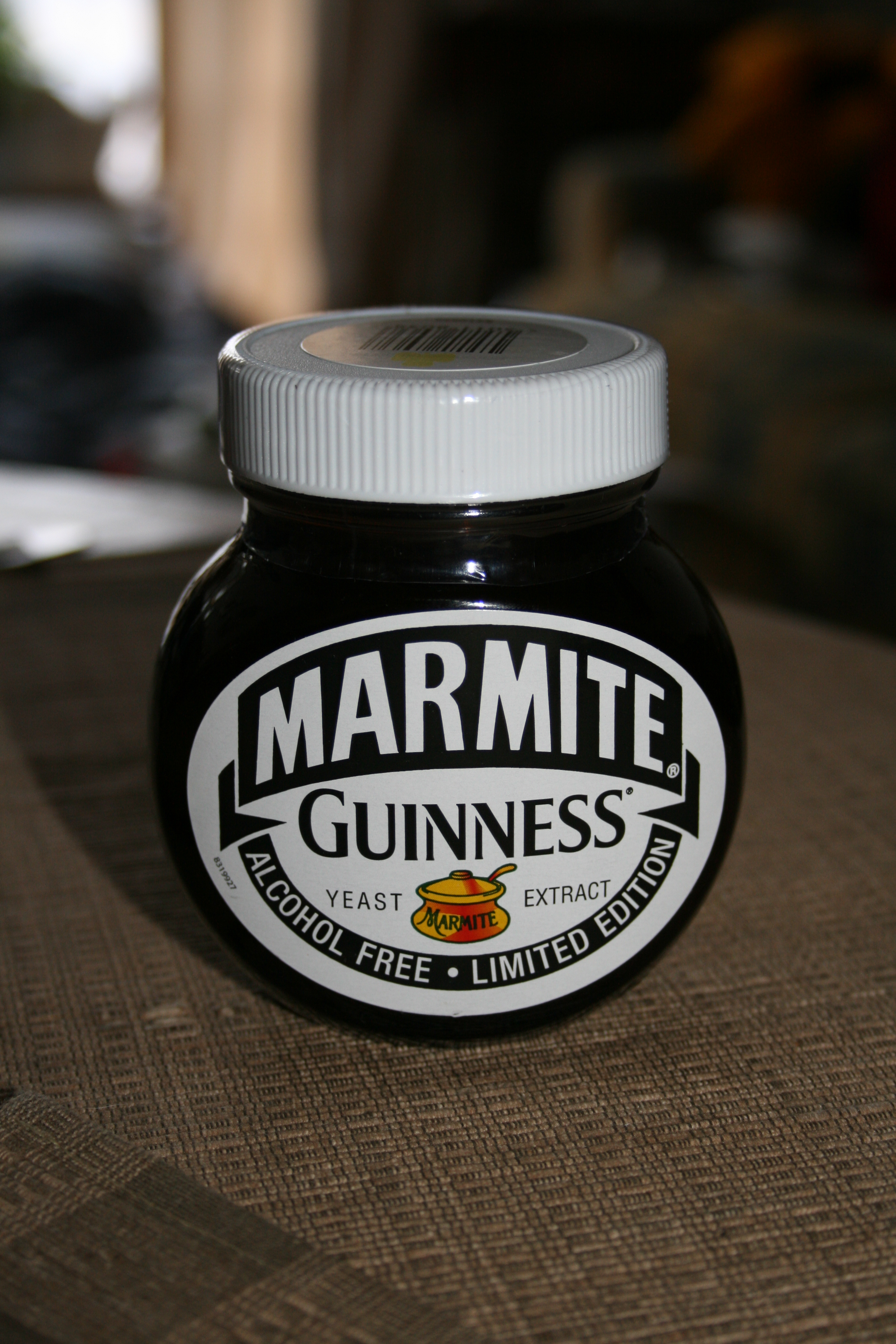
Marmite is made from the yeast left over from the brewing industry

Mann+Hummel UK, at Featherstone, make air and oil filters. Armitage Shanks (owned by Ideal Standard International) is to the east of Rugeley in Armitage with Handsacre; JCB Cab Systems was next to the A51 on the Riverside Industrial Estate. The UK headquarters of GE Grid Solutions is based at Stafford as well as a factory and the UK headquarters of Bostik on Common Road, in the north of the town.

Numark Pharmacy is at Tamworth. Bristan based in Dordon and Baddesley Ensor on the Birch Coppice Business Park south-west of Tamworth, next to a new Ocado distribution centre, is the UK's largest supplier of kitchen and bathroom taps; Volkswagen Group (VAG UK) have their main UK distribution facility there, the site of Birch Coppice Colliery before 1987. Ansell UK (medical gloves, from Australia) is on Tamworth Enterprise Park. Whittington Barracks (DMS Whittington) near to the west is the home of the Defence Medical Services, Defence Dental Service, and the Defence Medical Services Training Centre.

Premier Foods make Bird's Custard, Angel Delight and Marvel powdered milk in Knighton, west of Eccleshall near the Shropshire boundary. Ornua, best known for the Kerrygold brand, have a large cheese production site in Leek on Sunnyhills Road.

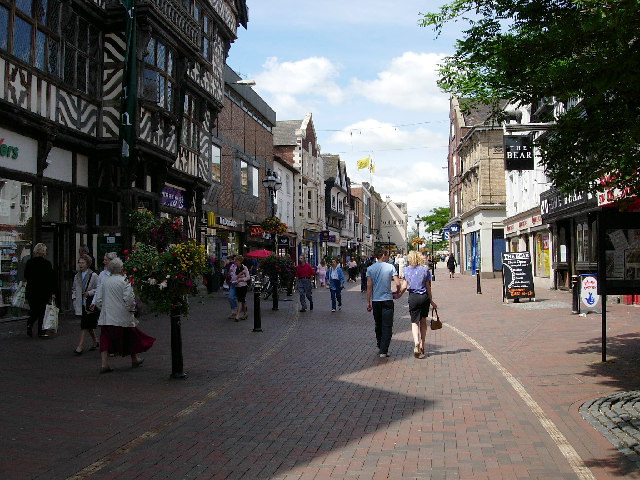
Stafford town centre

This is a chart of trend of regional gross value added of the non-metropolitan county of Staffordshire at current basic prices by Office for National Statistics with figures in millions of British pounds sterling.

Year	Regional gross value added	Agriculture	Industry	Services
1995	6,447	209	2,349	3,889
2000	8,621	150	2,986	5,485
2003	10,169	169	3,164	6,835

Some nationally and internationally known companies have their base in Staffordshire. They include the Britannia Building Society which is based in Leek. JCB is based in Rocester near Uttoxeter and Bet365 which is based in Stoke-on-Trent. The theme park Alton Towers is in the Staffordshire Moorlands and several of the world's largest pottery manufacturers are based in Stoke-on-Trent. The town of Burton upon Trent is known for its beer brewing industry with several major brands such as Carling, Cobra and Marston's brewed there.

== Government ==
=== Westminster parliamentary ===
The ceremonial county of Staffordshire (including the unitary authority of Stoke-on-Trent) is represented by twelve Members of Parliament (MPs) in the House of Commons. Nine of the MPs represent the Labour Party and three MPs represent the Conservative Party. The current membership of each constituency as of 2024 is as follows:

Conservative † Labour ‡ Reform UK ¤

Constituency (Note: BC denotes borough constituency, CC denotes county constituency.)	Electorate	Majority (Note: The majority is the number of votes the winning candidate receives more than their nearest rival.)	Member of Parliament	Nearest opposition	Map
Burton and Uttoxeter CC	77,992	2,266	Jacob Collier ‡	Kate Kniveton †	
Cannock Chase CC	76,974	3,125	Josh Newbury ‡	Amanda Milling †	
Kingswinford and South Staffordshire CC (part)	71,662	6,303	Mike Wood †	Sally Benton ‡	
Lichfield CC	76,118	810	Dave Robertson ‡	Michael Fabricant †	
Newcastle-under-Lyme CC	67,839	5,069	Adam Jogee ‡	Simon Tagg †	
Stafford CC	70,608	4,595	Leigh Ingham ‡	Theo Clarke †	
Staffordshire Moorlands CC	69,892	1,175	Karen Bradley †	Alastair Watson ‡	
Stoke-on-Trent Central BC	73,693	6,409	Gareth Snell ‡	Luke Shenton ¤	
Stoke-on-Trent North BC	69,790	5,082	David Williams ‡	Jonathan Gullis †	
Stoke-on-Trent South CC	68,263	627	Allison Gardner ‡	Jack Brereton †	
Stone, Great Wyrley and Penkridge CC	71,570	5,466	Gavin Williamson †	Jacqueline Brown ‡	
Tamworth CC	75,059	1,382	Sarah Edwards ‡	Eddie Hughes †	

=== County council ===
Staffordshire County Council is the top-tier local council for the non-metropolitan county. For Eurostat purposes, it is a NUTS 3 region (code UKG22).

Staffordshire operates a cabinet-style council. There are 62 councillors for Staffordshire. The Full Council elects a cabinet of 10 councillors, including the council leader, from the majority party. Each cabinet member has their own portfolio about which they make the "day to day" decisions.

2025 Staffordshire County Council election
Party	Candidates	Seats	Gains	Losses	Net gain/loss	Seats %	Votes %	Votes	+/−
Reform	62	49	33	0	▲49	79.0	41.2	91,128	+41.0
Conservative	62	10	0	30	▼47	16.1	27.8	61,474	–28.8
Labour	62	1	0	3	▼3	1.6	16.1	35,500	–10.1
Green	44	1	0	0	▲1	1.6	5.7	12,608	–0.7
Stafford Borough Independents	2	1	0	0	Steady	1.6	1.2	2,597	N/A
Liberal Democrats	42	0	0	0	Steady	0.0	5.4	11,910	+2.7
Independent	15	0	0	0	Steady	0.0	2.3	5,149	–1.8
UKIP	5	0	0	0	Steady	0.0	0.2	356	–0.8
TUSC	3	0	0	0	Steady	0.0	0.1	168	±0.0
Workers Party	1	0	0	0	Steady	0.0	<0.1	56	N/A

=== Future ===
In July 2026, the UK Government announced that it intends to reorganise Staffordshire into two unitary authority areas by April 2028. The county will be divided north-south, with the northern area combining the current districts of Newcastle-under-Lyme, Stoke-on-Trent, and Staffordshire Moorlands, to form a new North Staffordshire unitary authority, and the southern area combining East Staffordshire, Lichfield, South Staffordshire, Stafford, Stone, and Tamworth to form a new Southern and Mid Staffordshire unitary authority. Elections to the new unitary councils will take place in May 2027.

== Areas ==
Administrative borough	Centre of administration	Other towns, villages and settlements
Cannock Chase District	Cannock	Hednesford, Rugeley, Norton Canes, Hazelslade, Heath Hayes, Cannock Wood, Bridgtown
East Staffordshire	Burton upon Trent	Uttoxeter, Barton under Needwood, Branston, Rolleston-on-Dove, Rocester, Denstone
Lichfield District	Lichfield	Burntwood, Fazeley, Alrewas, Shenstone, Hammerwich, Chasetown, Muckley Corner
South Staffordshire	Codsall	Brewood, Penkridge, Gailey, Four Ashes, Coven Heath, Featherstone
Newcastle Borough	Newcastle-under-Lyme	Silverdale, Madeley, Keele, Audley, Halmerend, Kidsgrove Chesterton
Stafford	Stafford	Haughton, Stone, Norton Bridge, Eccleshall, Gnosall, Baschurch
Staffordshire Moorlands District	Leek	Alton, Hulme End, Waterhouses, Cheadle, Biddulph, Endon, Froghall, Ipstones, Oakamoor, Cauldon Lowe, Rushton Spencer, Rudyard, Tean
City of Stoke-on-Trent (unitary authority)	Stoke on Trent	Hanley, Burslem, Tunstall, Longton, Fenton, Stoke-upon-Trent, Trentham
Tamworth District (previously in Warwickshire)	Tamworth	Wilnecote, Stonydelph, Glascote, Belgrave, Dosthill

=== Historic ===
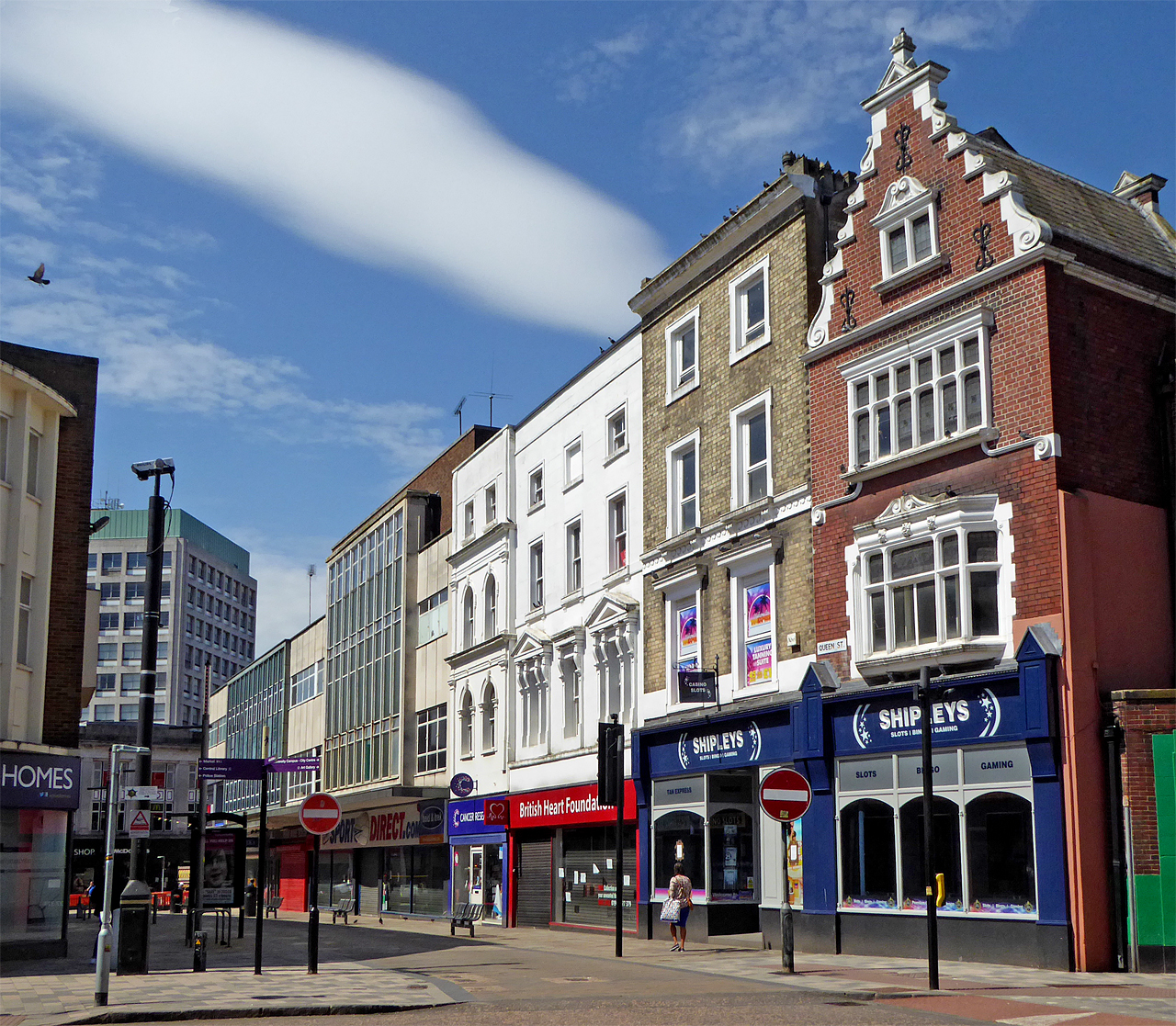
Wolverhampton

Some settlements were formerly governed as part of the county, these are now under the West Midlands county:

West Midlands	Aldridge, Bilston, Bloxwich, Brierley Hill, Brownhills, Coseley, Darlaston, Harborne, Kingswinford, Pelsall, Rowley Regis, Sedgley, Smethwick, Tipton, Walsall, Wednesbury, Wednesfield, West Bromwich, Willenhall, Wolverhampton

== Religion ==
In the 2011 United Kingdom census, the population of Staffordshire reported their religion as follows:

Religion reported in 2011 UK census
	Staffordshire county (excludes Stoke-on-Trent)		Stoke-on-Trent	
	Count	%age	Count	%age
Population	848,489	100	249,008	100
Has religion	600,127	70.7	170,329	68.4
Christianity	578,352	68.2	151,624	60.9
Sikhism	3,086	0.4	579	0.2
Hinduism	2,773	0.3	1,384	0.6
Buddhism	299	0.0	66	0.0
Islam	10,817	1.3	14,993	6.0
Judaism	2,017	0.2	760	0.3
Other religion	2,783	0.3	923	0.4
No religion	193,662	22.8	62,737	25.2
Religion not stated	54,700	6.4	15,942	6.4

=== Church of England ===
The only cathedral in the county is Lichfield Cathedral in the city of Lichfield. The Diocese of Lichfield covers the whole county with the exception of Stapenhill and Amington, the north of the nearby county of Shropshire and the Black Country area of the West Midlands. The county is covered by the archdeaconries of Stoke-upon-Trent and Lichfield. The current Bishop of Lichfield is Michael Ipgrave and the current Bishop of Stafford Geoff Annas. There are 298 Church of England churches in the county.

=== Roman Catholic Church ===
Staffordshire is part of the Roman Catholic Archdiocese of Birmingham. The current archbishop is Bernard Longley.

=== Methodism ===
Primitive Methodism was founded in Staffordshire by Hugh Bourne, a native of Stoke-on-Trent, at a public gathering in the village of Mow Cop. He originally followed the Wesleyan form of Methodism but in 1801 he reformed the Methodist service by conducting it outside. By 1811 with his brother he founded the first chapel in the Tunstall area of Stoke-on-Trent. Since 1932 the Primitive and Wesleyan movements have been a single organisation, the Methodist Church of Great Britain. The Methodist Churches of Staffordshire fall within three Districts: Birmingham District, Wolverhampton and Shrewsbury District and Chester & Stoke-on-Trent District.

=== Judaism ===
The most popular synagogue in the county is on London Road in Newcastle-Under-Lyme, which opened in 2006 and replaced the former Birch Terrace synagogue in Hanley. According to the 2001 census there were 407 Jews in the non-metropolitan county of Staffordshire, and 83 in Stoke-on-Trent.

=== Islam ===
There are 15 mosques in Stoke-on-Trent, 5 in Burton-upon-Trent and 1 in both Stafford and Lichfield. As of 2019 a new mosque has finished construction in the Hanley area of Stoke-on-Trent and is the first purpose-built mosque in the area. At the 2001 census there were 7,658 Muslims in Stoke-on-Trent and 6,081 in the rest of Staffordshire, with a total of 13,739 making up 1.3% of the population. 62.9% (3823) of the Muslims in the rest of Staffordshire are from the town of Burton-upon-Trent.

== Transport ==
=== Canals ===
Staffordshire has an extensive network of canals including the Birmingham and Fazeley Canal, Caldon Canal, Coventry Canal, Shropshire Union Canal, Staffordshire and Worcestershire Canal and Trent and Mersey Canal.

=== Railways ===
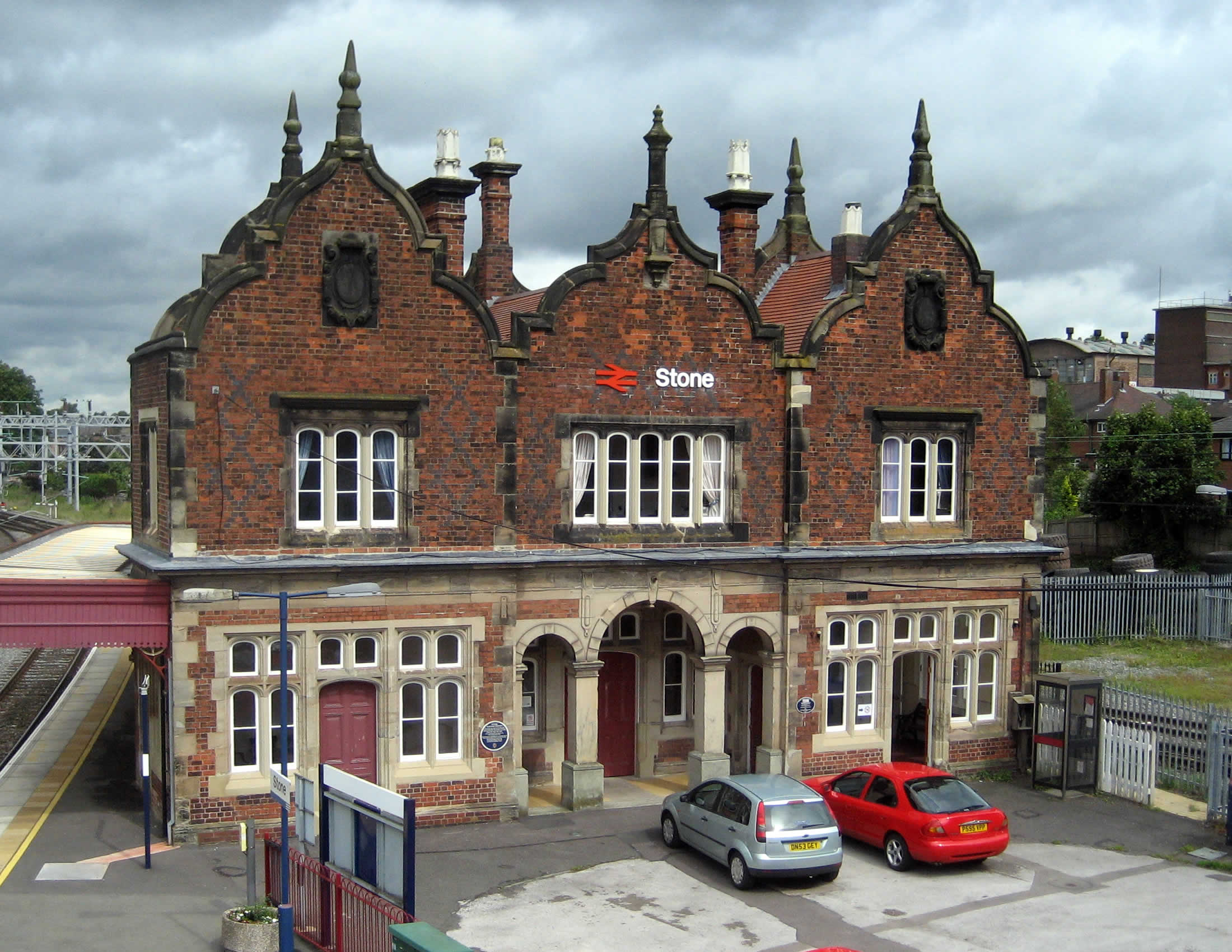
Stone railway station in Stone

Staffordshire has several railways that pass through and serve settlements within the county. The most important of these is the West Coast Main Line, which facilitates through services between London and Scotland, Manchester and Liverpool.

Located on the West Coast Main Line, Stafford railway station is at a junction with the line to Birmingham New Street, a major hub, and is predominantly served by London Northwestern Railway. Rugeley Trent Valley, Lichfield Trent Valley and Penkridge are also on mainline railway routes.

Stoke-on-Trent railway station is the busiest station in Staffordshire and is served by long-distance CrossCountry and Avanti West Coast trains to Manchester, Birmingham, London, Oxford, Reading, Bristol, Southampton and Bournemouth. This station is also the terminus of the North Staffordshire line to Derby and Nottingham via Uttoxeter, which narrowly avoided closure in the 1960s. It also offers local commuter services to Manchester with Northern Railways.

Stone railway station reopened in 2008.

=== Roads ===
The county has relatively good links to the national roads network. Several major roads intersect the county, making it a popular location for commuters working in Birmingham. The M42 junction 10 is in Tamworth and the motorway heads southwest towards Birmingham. The M6 runs north–south through the county, which contains junctions 10A–16. The M6 Toll, the UK's first toll motorway, runs through the county with junctions in Weeford near Lichfield, Cannock and joins the M6 south of Stafford.

The A5 and A34 run through the county. The former has been significantly widened to a dual carriageway at several sections, although much of it remains single carriageway.

=== Air ===
There are currently no airports with scheduled flights in the county, with the nearest ones being Birmingham, East Midlands and Manchester. Depending on the location, there is, however, Wolverhampton Airport in Bobbington and Tatenhill Airfield near Burton-upon-Trent, both of which are small airports catering for general aviation.

=== Bus ===
Services within the county are chiefly provided by Arriva Midlands, D&G Bus and First Potteries. National Express coaches serve towns and cities on a daily basis.

== Media ==
=== Newspapers ===
Daily Newspapers in Staffordshire are The Sentinel, covering Stoke-on-Trent, Newcastle-under-Lyme and the Staffordshire Moorlands, Burton Mail which covers the town of Burton-upon-Trent and the Express & Star which has several editions covering Tamworth, Lichfield, Cannock Chase and Stafford.

=== Radio ===
The local BBC radio stations covering Staffordshire are BBC Radio Stoke covering Mid and North Staffordshire, BBC Radio WM covering the south of the county and BBC Radio Derby covering East Staffordshire. The local commercial radio stations are Hits Radio Staffordshire & Cheshire and Greatest Hits Radio Staffordshire & Cheshire which cover North and Mid Staffordshire, and Capital Mid-Counties, which covers Burton, Lichfield and Tamworth. Further stations which cover parts of Staffordshire include Heart, Smooth, and Greatest Hits Radio which cover the southern parts of the county. Hits Radio Birmingham covers Lichfield and Tamworth, and Hits Radio Black Country & Shropshire covers the Cannock area.

United Christian Broadcasters, which has facilities in Burslem and Hanchurch, has been involved in radio broadcasting since 1987. Today it is broadcast nationally in the UK through DAB digital radio.

Community radio

Staffordshire is served by a number of community radio stations. In North Staffordshire, there are four community radio stations – Moorlands Radio in Leek, 6 Towns Radio, based in Burslem, The Hitmix, based in Newcastle-under-Lyme and Cross Rhythms City Radio based in Hanley

In Stafford there is Vibe 1, which broadcasts to the town on 107.3 FM.

In the Cannock Chase District, there is Cannock Chase Radio, which broadcasts on 89.6, 89.8 and 94.0 FM, and in Tamworth, there is Radio Tamworth, which broadcasts on 106.8 FM.

=== Television ===
Staffordshire is served by the ITV Central and BBC West Midlands television regions, both of which have their studios in Birmingham. The far north of the county, around Biddulph, is served by ITV Granada and BBC North West from MediaCityUK in Salford.

== Notable people ==
- George Anson, 1st Baron Anson (1697–1762), admiral of the fleet
- Philip Astley (1742–1814), "father of the modern circus"
- Joseph Bamford (1916–2001), businessman
- Arnold Bennett (1867–1931), novelist
- Havergal Brian (1876–1972), composer
- Vera Brittain (1893–1970), writer, feminist
- Bruno Brookes (born 1959), radio DJ
- Clarice Cliff (1899–1972), pottery designer
- Peter De Wint (1784–1849), landscape painter
- John Gilbert (1724–95), land agent
- Nick Hancock (born 1962), broadcast presenter
- Thomas Harrison (1616–60), Fifth Monarchist, major-general and regicide
- Hugh Henshall (1734–1816), canal engineer
- Elgar Howarth (1935–2025), composer and conductor
- John Jervis, 1st Earl of St Vincent (1735–1823), admiral of the fleet
- Samuel Johnson (1709–84), author and lexicographer
- Lemmy (Kilmister), 1945–2015), rock musician
- Stanley Matthews (1915–2000), footballer
- Thomas Maxfield (ca.1590–1616), Catholic priest and martyr
- R. J. Mitchell (1895–1937), aircraft designer
- Neil Morrissey (born 1962), actor
- Oswald Mosley (1896–1980), aristocrat and politician
- Ada Nield (1870–1945), suffragist
- William Palmer (1824–56), poisoner
- Mary Sackville (ca.1586–1645), Countess of Dorset, royal governess
- Edward Smith (1850–1912), sea captain
- Josiah Spode (1733–97), potter
- Hanley Stafford (1899–1968), actor
- Thomas Sutton (1767–1835), physician
- Jackie Trent (1940–2015), singer-songwriter
- Anthea Turner (born 1960), television presenter
- Isaak Walton (1593–1683), writer
- Francis Webb (1836–1906), railway mechanical engineer
- Josiah Wedgwood (1730–95), potter
- Werburgh (ca.650–700), princess and abbess
- Elizabeth Wilbraham (1632–1705), architectural patron
- Robbie Williams (born 1974), pop singer
- A. N. Wilson (born 1950), writer
- Whitaker Wright (1846–1904), fraudulent company promoter
- James Wyatt (1746–1813), architect
- Jeffry Wyatville (1766–1840), architect

== Places of interest ==
Key
	Abbey/Priory/Cathedral
Accessible open space	Accessible open space
	Amusement/Theme Park
	Castle
Country Park	Country Park
	English Heritage
	Forestry Commission
Heritage railway	Heritage railway
Historic house	Historic House
Places of Worship	Places of Worship
Museum (free) Museum	Museum (free/not free)
National Trust	National Trust
	Theatre
	Zoo

- Alton Towers
- Ancient High House
- Apedale Community Country Park
- Biddulph Grange
- Blithfield Hall
- Blithfield Reservoir
- Brindley Water Mill
- Broad Eye Windmill
- Cannock Chase
- Chasewater Railway
- Cheddleton Flint Mill
- Churnet Valley Railway
- Croxden Abbey
- Dovedale
- Downs Banks
- Drayton Manor Resort
- Eccleshall Castle
- Erasmus Darwin House
- Ford Green Hall
- Foxfield Steam Railway
- Gladstone Pottery Museum
- Hanley Park
- Heart of England Way
- Moseley Railway Trust (Apedale)
- Ilam Park
- Izaak Walton's Cottage
- Manifold Way following the route of the former Leek and Manifold Valley Light Railway
- National Brewery Centre
- Lichfield Cathedral
- Madeley Old Hall
- Monkey Forest at Trentham Gardens
- Moseley Old Hall
- Mow Cop Castle
- Middleport Pottery
- National Memorial Arboretum
- Peak District National Park
- Potteries Museum & Art Gallery
- Pennine Way
- RSPB Coombes Valley
- Rudyard Lake Steam Railway
- Sandon Hall
- Shugborough Estate
- Stafford Parish Church
- Stafford Castle
- Staffordshire Regiment Museum
- Staffordshire Way
- Stoke Minster
- The Roaches
- Tamworth Castle
- Trentham Gardens
- Tutbury Castle
- Victoria Park, Stafford
- Wall Roman Site
- Wedgwood Museum
- Weston Park
- Whitmore Hall

== Gallery ==
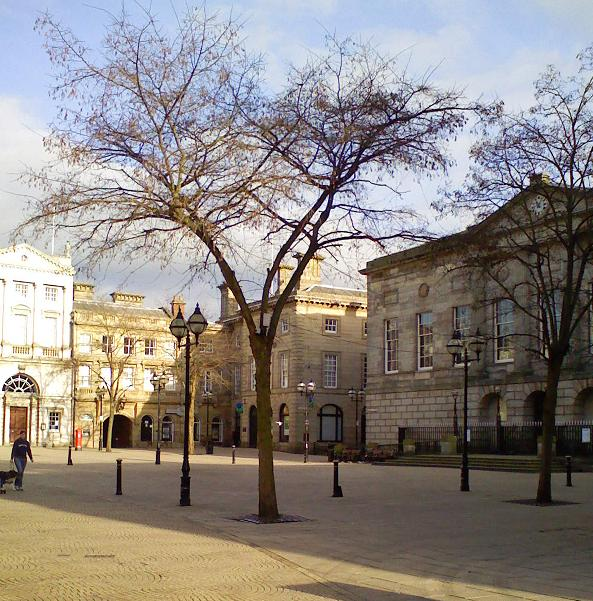
Stafford Shire Hall

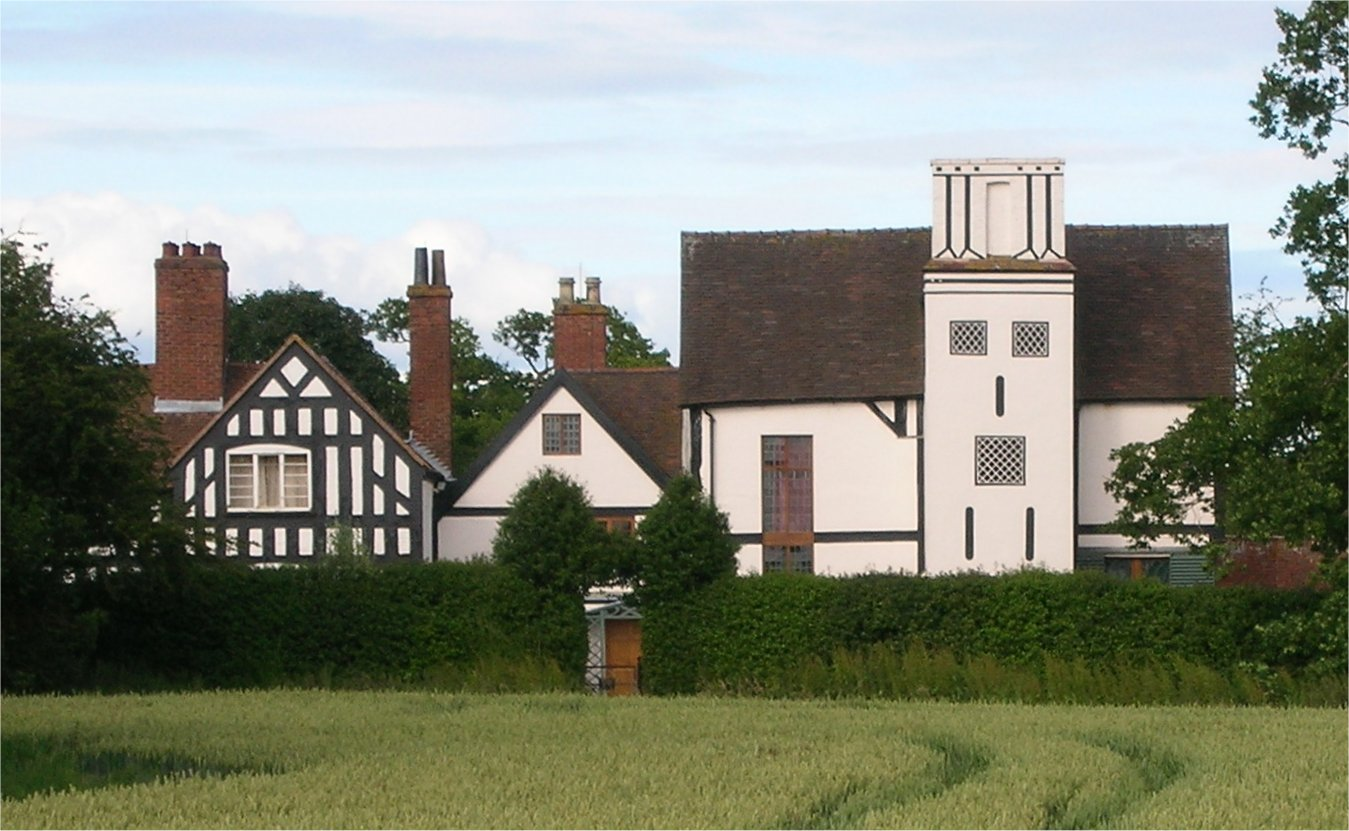
Boscobel House

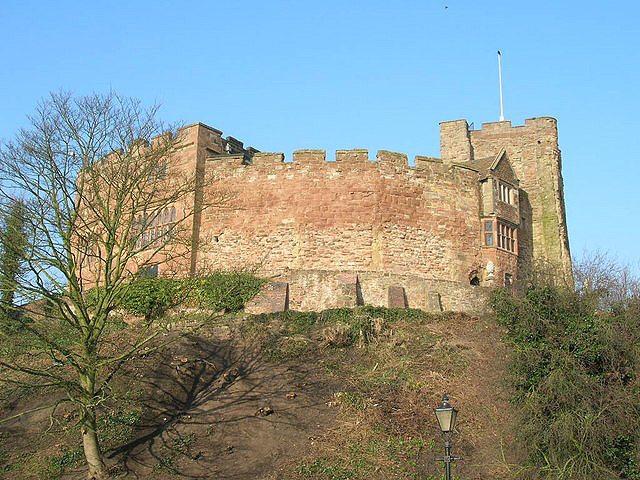
Tamworth Castle

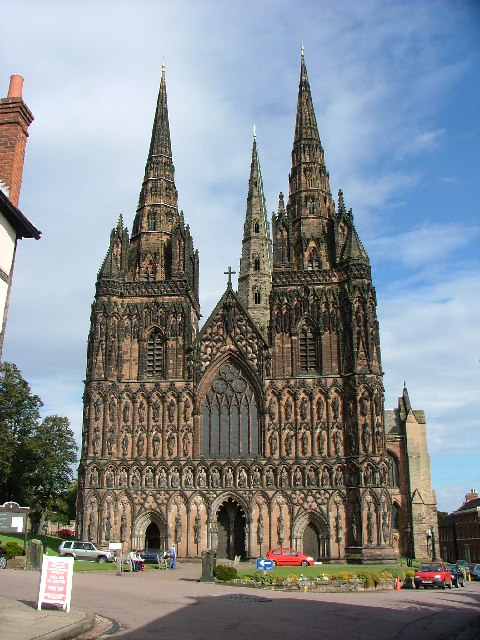
Lichfield Cathedral

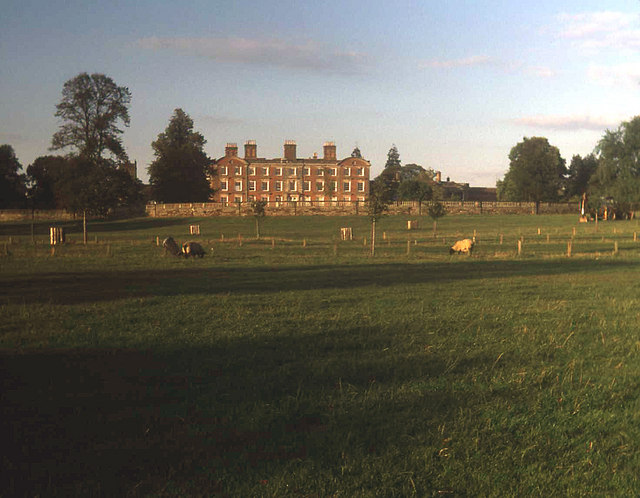
Weston Park

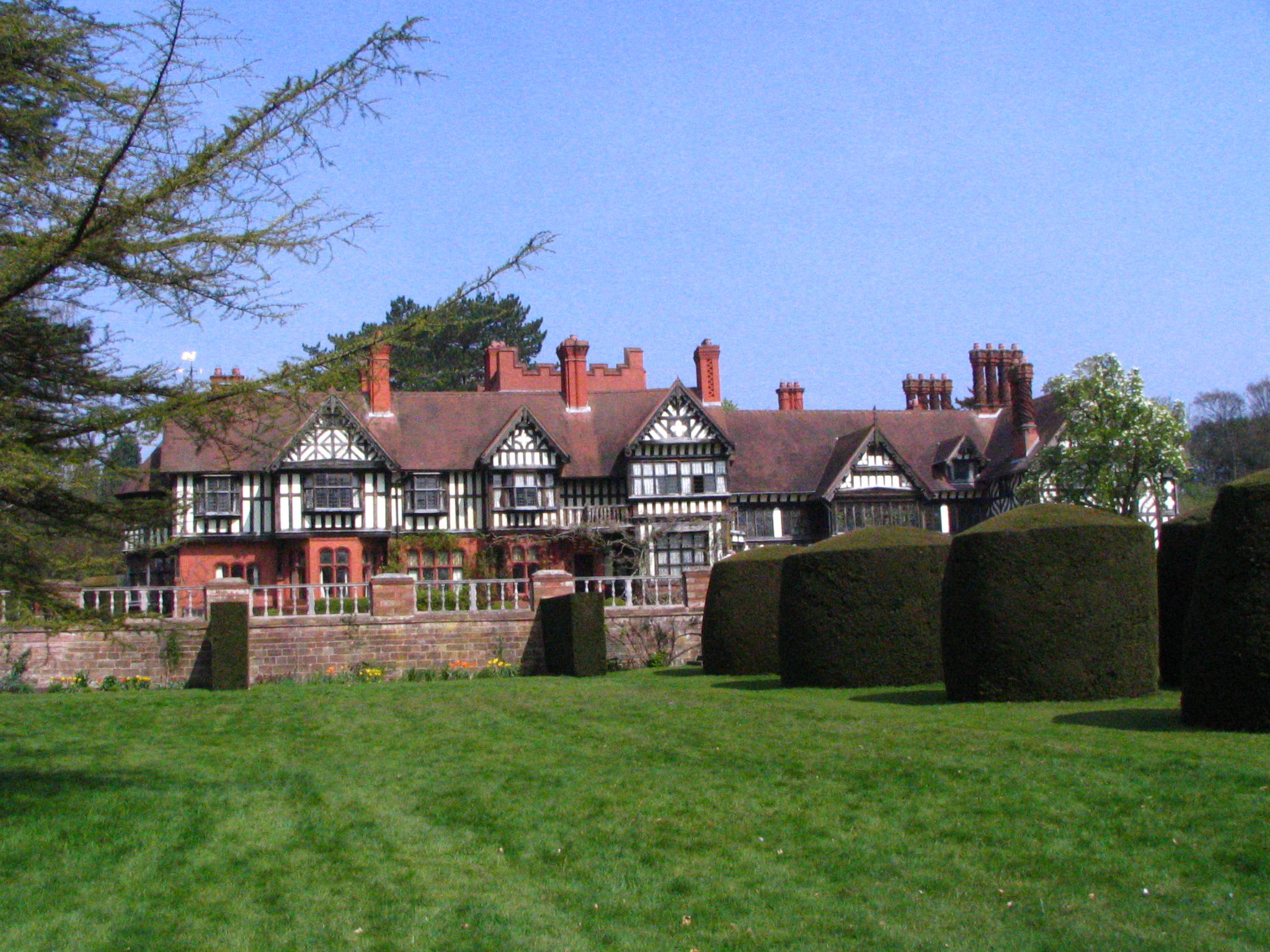
Wightwick Manor

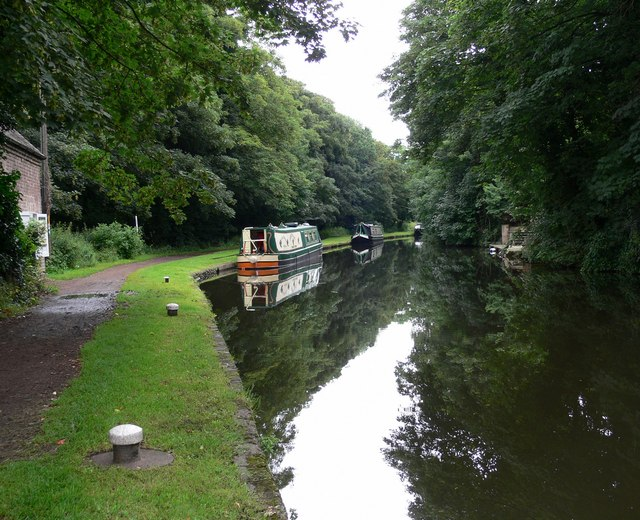
The Staffordshire & Worcestershire Canal

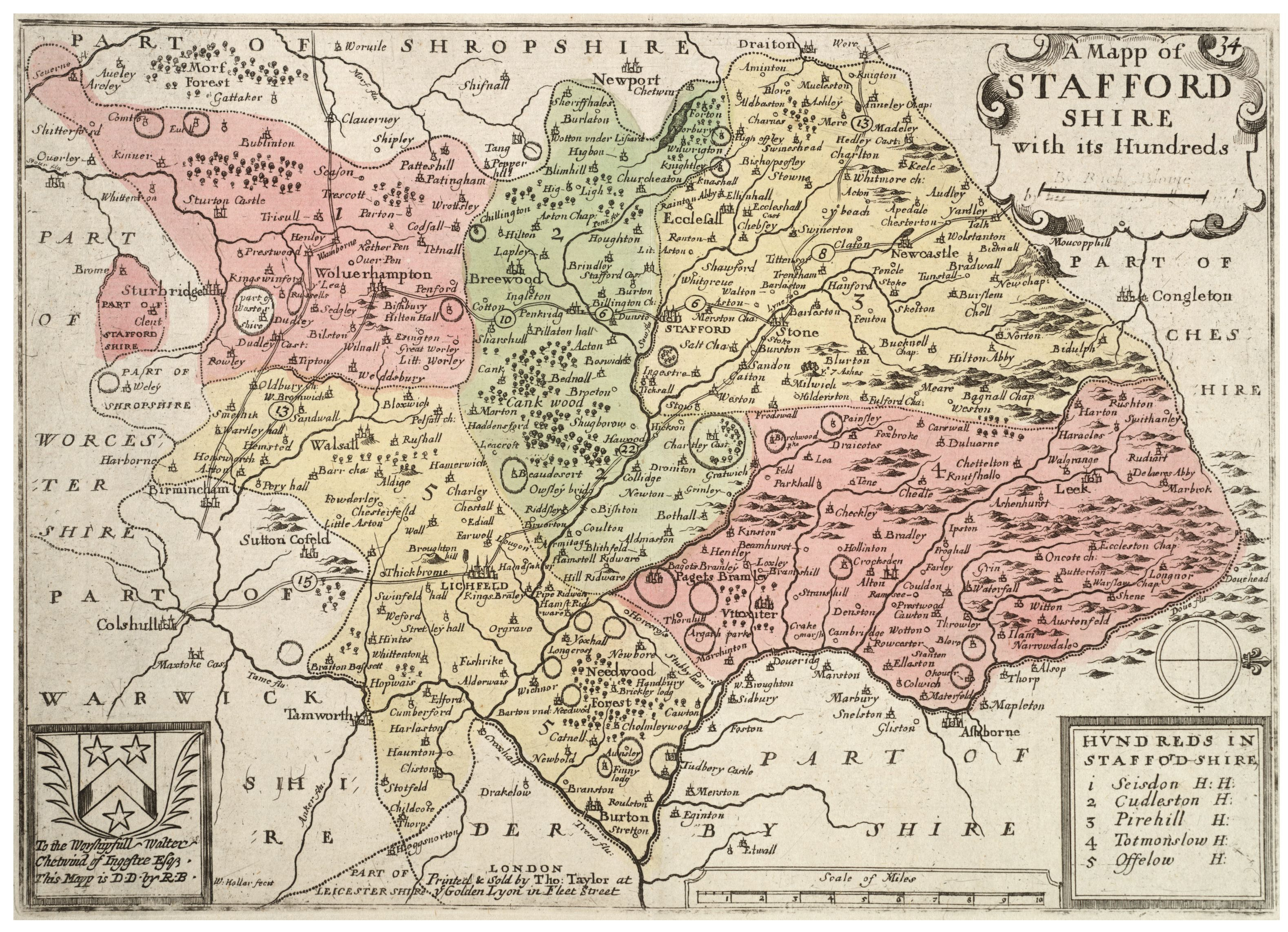
Map of Staffordshire and its hundreds, by Wenceslas Hollar, c. 1627–1677

== See also ==
- Lord Lieutenant of Staffordshire
- High Sheriff of Staffordshire
- List of MPs for Staffordshire
- Samuel Hieronymus Grimm
- The Stafford knot
- Tamworth Pig
- Healthcare in Staffordshire
- List of English and Welsh endowed schools (19th century)#Staffordshire
- Staffordshire Police
- Staffordshire Police and Crime Commissioner
- Flag of Staffordshire
- Staffordshire Bull Terrier
