= Numark (pharmacy) =

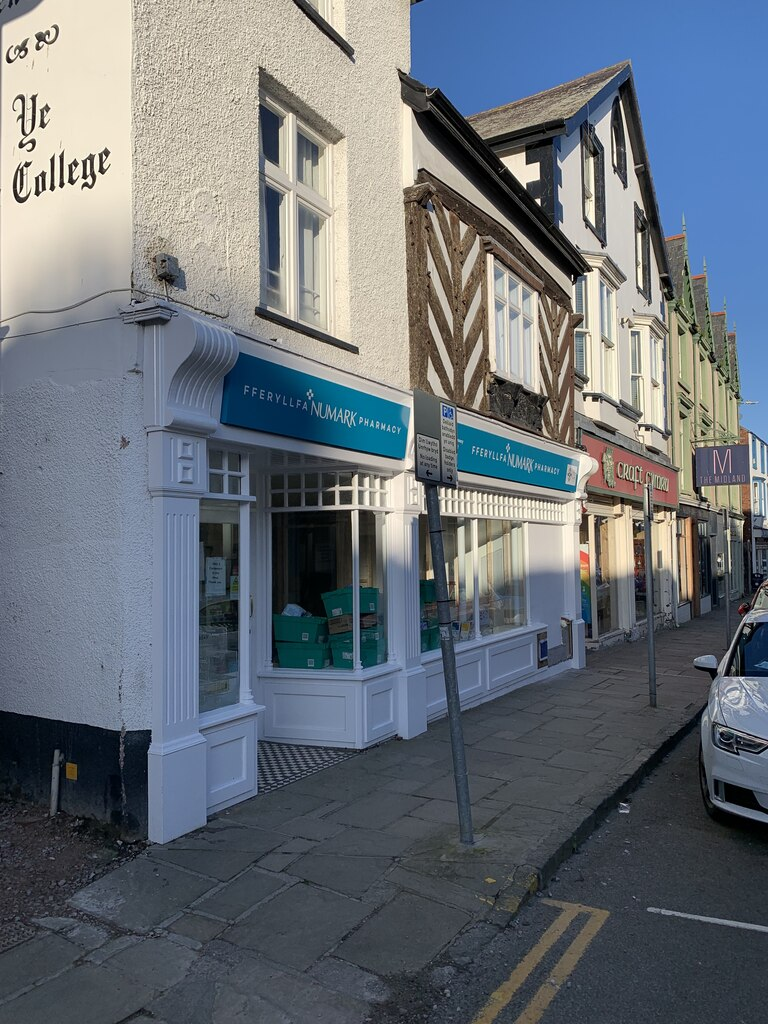
- The Numark pharmacy (operated under Rowlands Pharmacy) on Castle Street (A547, Conwy pictured in 2022, this store is an amalgamation of the two previous Rowlands Pharmacy in the town.
- Headquarters: Tamworth, Staffordshire
- Number of locations: 3000 outlets
- Area served: England; Wales; Scotland; Northern Ireland
- Website: www.numarknet.com

Numark, Ltd. was a chain of independent pharmacies in the UK. With 3100 outlets throughout England, Wales, Scotland and Northern Ireland, they were the largest chain in this domain in UK. It is now part of the PHOENIX Group.

There are 5,200 independent pharmacy members through Numark and selected Rowlands Pharmacy branches nationwide. Both Numark and Rowlands Pharmacy are owned by Phoenix.

Each pharmacy business within Numark is an independently owned outlet, but membership of Numark allows individual retailers to take advantage of "group purchasing deals" to reduce their costs. This model is known as a symbol group, or virtual chain. Numark also offers marketing support, such as signage, advertising and demographic research for product targeting purposes, to its members.

Numark has a range of Own Brand Products such as vitamins, OTC medicines and toiletries.

Numark central office is based in Tamworth, Staffordshire.

In May 2023, Rowlands Pharmacy acquired 30 Lloyds Pharmacy branches in Scotland, increasing its number of community pharmacy branches of the larger Numark network to over 70 directly owned branches in Scotland.
