= Royal Pavilion, Aldershot =

Former Royal residence in Aldershot in Hampshire

Royal Pavilion Queen's Pavilion
- The Royal Pavilion in 1905

- Location of Royal Pavilion in the United Kingdom
- 51.2507°N 0.7842°W
- Type: Royal Residence
- Location: Farnborough Road, Aldershot, Hampshire, United Kingdom

History
- Built: 1855
- Built for: Queen Victoria and Prince Albert
- Demolished: 1960s

Site notes
- Architect: George Myers

The Royal Pavilion, also known as the Queen's Pavilion, was a royal residence located at Aldershot in Hampshire. The most unpretentious of all royal residences, it was built by George Myers as a wooden structure in 1855 for Queen Victoria and Prince Albert for use by members of the Royal Family when in Aldershot to attend military reviews and other occasions. Located off the Farnborough Road opposite the former West Cavalry Barracks, nearby are the Royal Garrison Church and the Wellington Statue. It was dismantled in the early 1960s. Today the site is the location of the Royal Pavilion Office Park.

== Origins of the Royal Pavilion ==
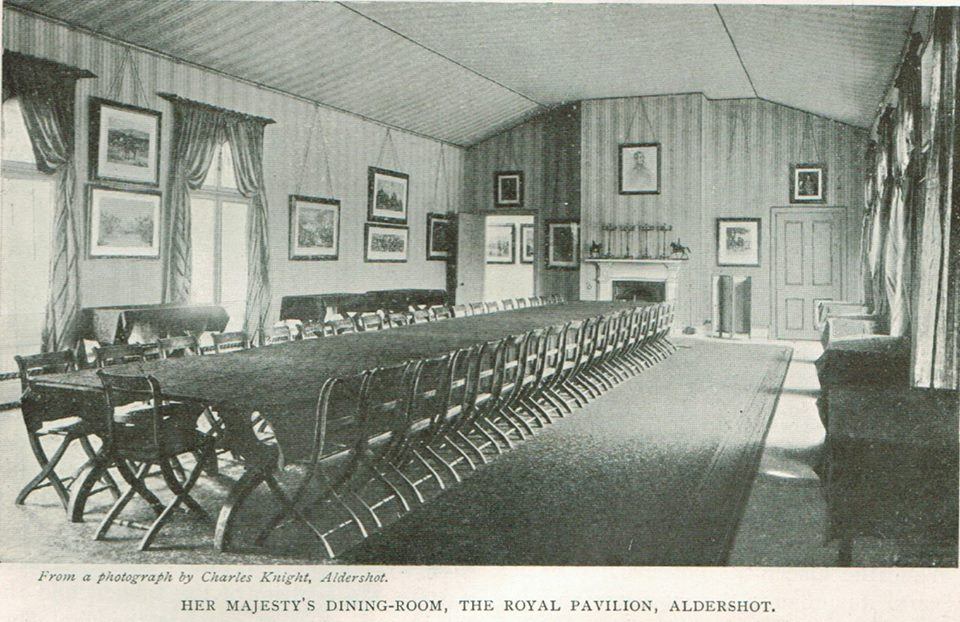
The dining room in the Royal Pavilion in 1900

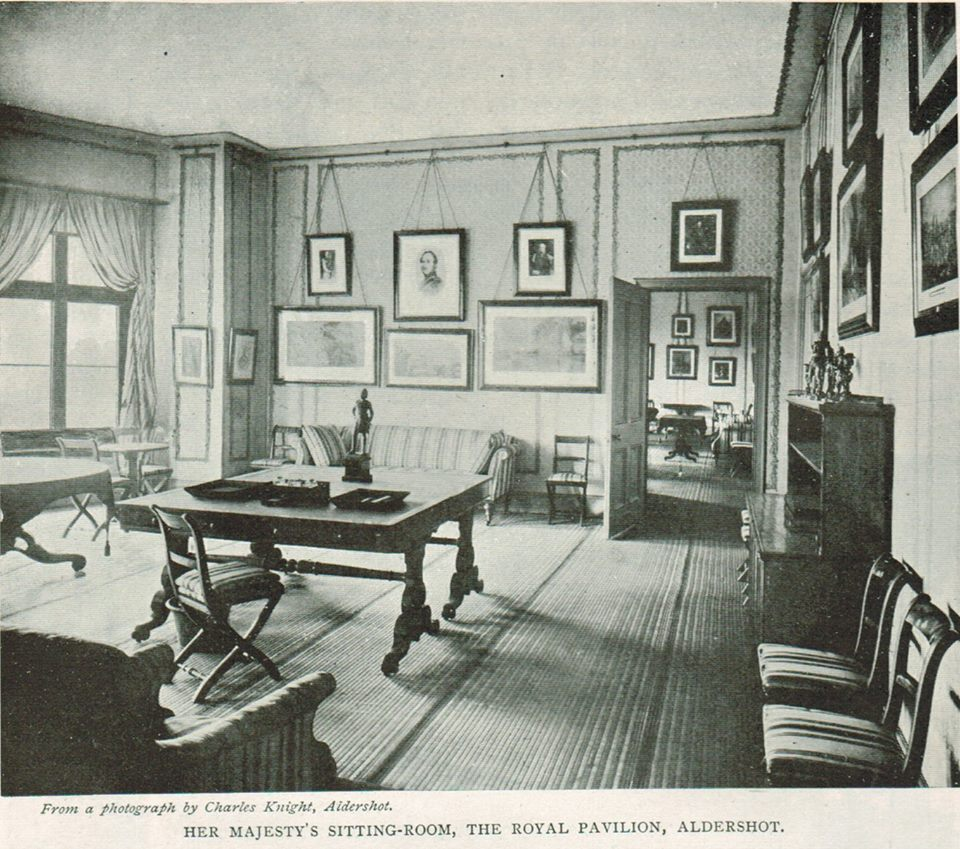
Queen Victoria's sitting room in the Pavilion in 1900

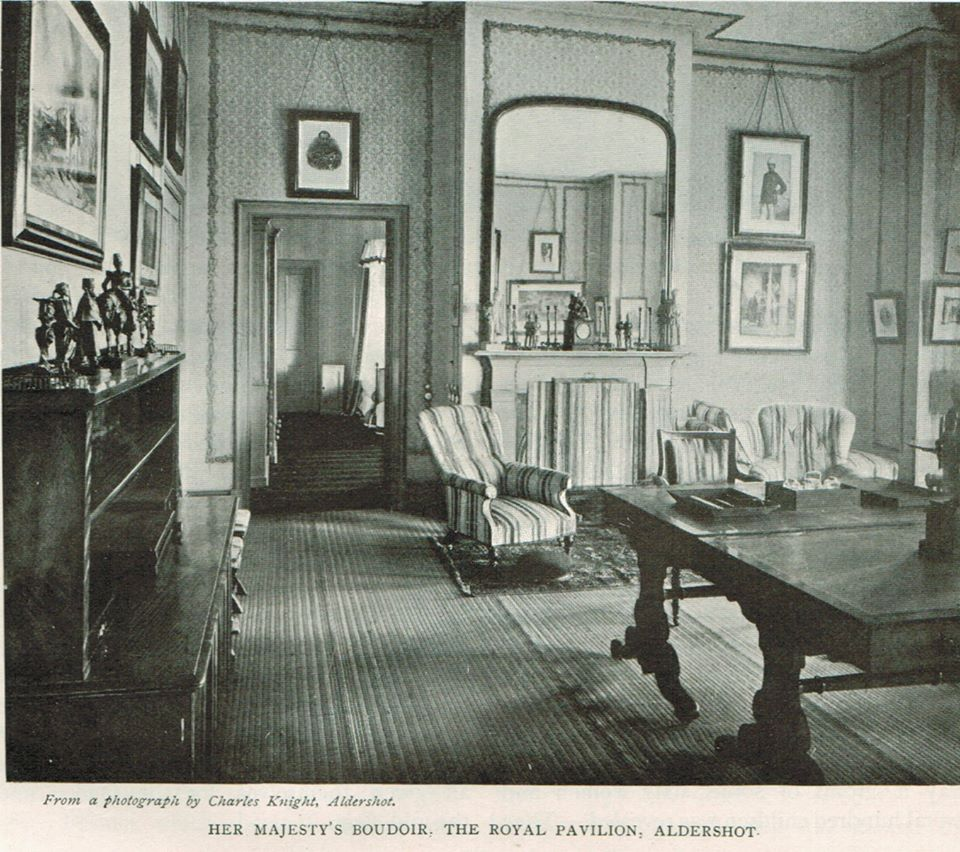
Queen Victoria's boudoir in the Pavilion in 1900

Before the establishment of the 'Camp at Aldershot', the British Army did not have any single permanent camp for training troops on a large scale. Prince Albert realised that the training and resources of the British Army compared unfavourably with some European armies and lobbied for something to be done. In 1852, following the death of The Iron Duke, a group of reformers, which included Prince Albert, forged an alliance that would seek to improve the training of the Army. Consequently, several thousands of acres of Aldershot heathland were subsequently purchased with the view to setting up a permanent military camp in the area.

As Queen Victoria and Prince Albert showed a keen interest in the establishment and the development of Aldershot as a garrison town, on 2 April 1854 Prince Albert, accompanied by Lord Hardinge, Major General Sir Frederick Smith and a Lieutenant Nicholson inspected a number of sites in the Aldershot area before selecting a small hill overlooking the Long Valley and Caesar's Camp. Prince Albert instructed Lieutenant Nicholson to ride around the approved site dropping sticks from a bundle of pea sticks to mark the boundaries for the proposed Pavilion.

In 1855 the Royal Pavilion was built by George Myers, one of the contractors involved in building the nearby Camp, as a temporary residence in the style of a wooden pavilion. Myers is best known as the builder employed by Augustus Pugin to execute the majority of his designs. One of the first buildings to be erected in the new Camp, the Pavilion is recorded as having had "graceful timberwork, looking oddly like C20 Scandinavian and an impressive testimony to Prince Albert's modernity". Victoria and Albert would often stay at the Pavilion when attending reviews of the Army on the nearby Long Valley.

== The design ==
On 16 June 1855 Queen Victoria made her first visit to the Royal Pavilion and, following an inspection of the Camp took refreshments in the Pavilion. Her first stay there was in April 1856 on the occasion of her inspecting 14,000 troops at Aldershot. Queen Victoria "was delighted with [the building's] simplicity, the charming views from its windows and its seclusion" and she painted some of these views during her visits to Aldershot. A writer for The Illustrated London News, however, was less enthusiastic, writing of the Pavilion that "The design was of three sides of a square - bald, cold and ugly to an extreme. The whole Pavilion is built entirely of wood - not a single brick has been used in its construction."

Its pine wood walls were painted white and the shutters on either side of each window were painted green. The Pavilion's interior walls and ceilings were made of canvas stretched over a wooden frame and papered over. The building had a breakfast room, drawing room, large dining room with salon and a study for Prince Albert. There were four large bedrooms - one each for Albert and Victoria and two more for important guests.

The terrace had a small artificial pond with goldfish. With stabling for 40 horses, the kitchen and servants' quarters were nearby in a detached building at the rear of the Pavilion and on a lower level. The kitchens were connected to the Pavilion by way of an underground passage with a glass roof half way along its length.

== Royal residence ==
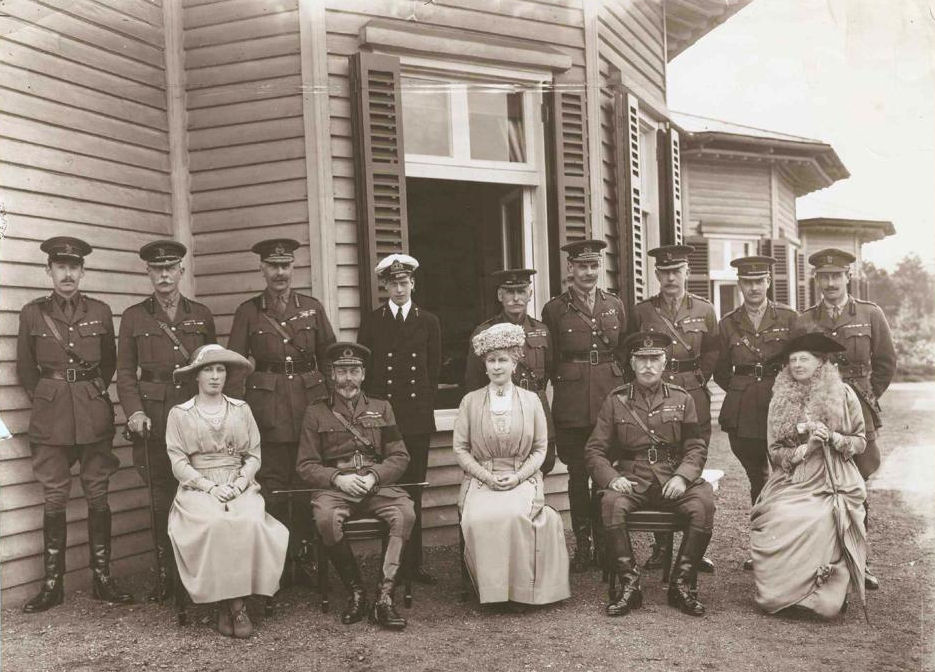
George V and Queen Mary with members of the Royal Family and senior military figures at the Pavilion in 1921

In 1879 the Royal Pavilion was occupied for a period by the Duke of Connaught after his wedding, while in March 1903 it was occupied by Edward VII and Queen Alexandra.

George V and Queen Mary were regular visitors early in their reign. When they were staying at the Pavilion in 1914, however, the local police were kept busy preventing Suffragettes from getting into the grounds. The Royal Family did not return to the Pavilion until 1923 to attend one of the famous military tattoos being held nearby.

In 1935 it became the residence of Prince Henry, Duke of Gloucester near the barracks of the Duke's regiment where the Duke was taking the Army staff course. "It was a very simple cabin" recalled the Duchess of Gloucester, and "the only royal thing about it was my husband's presence".

== Later uses ==
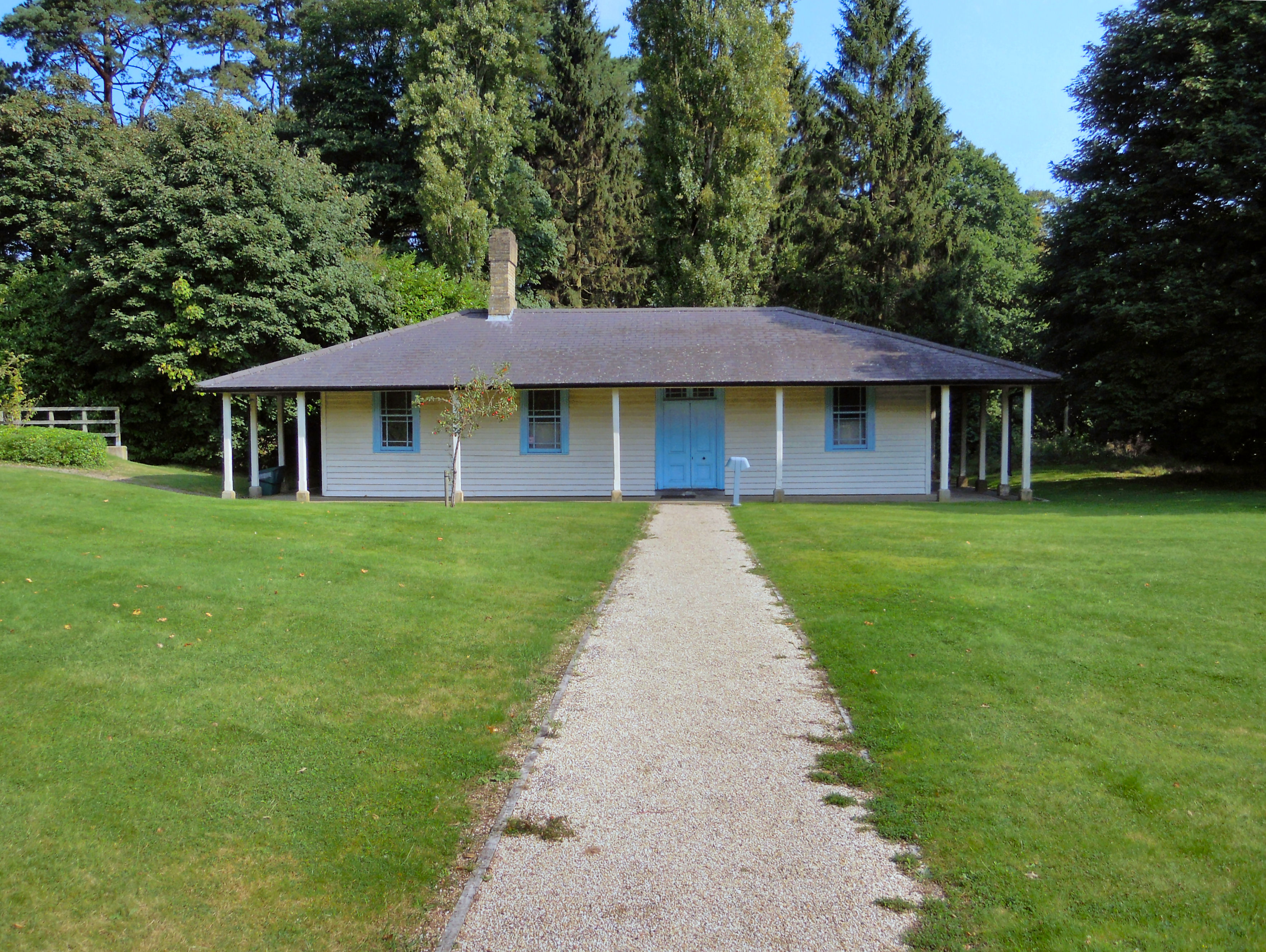
The former Guardroom is a listed building

During World War II the Royal Pavilion came under the control of Aldershot and District Borough Council when it became the officers' mess for the Canadian Army Overseas. From March to June 1944 it was the Headquarters for the 11th Armoured Division, and from November 1944 it became "B" Mess for the Headquarters Aldershot Division. From January to July 1948 it was the officers' mess for the 2nd Battalion the Royal Tank Regiment, after which from July 1948 to May 1949 it was taken over by the 3rd Battalion the Coldstream Guards. From 1951 the Royal Pavilion had become the officers' mess for 13 Command Workshops REME.

After the Pavilion was dismantled the site was used in 1963 to build a Training Centre for the Queen Alexandra's Royal Army Nursing Corps (QARANC) with Princess Margaret laying the foundation stone. Facilities included a drill square, small gym, learning centre, single roomed accommodation, dining hall, kitchens, NAAFI coffee bar and lounge area, QARANC Museum, (now at Keogh Barracks, Ash Vale), a guardroom, courtyard, an officers' mess and accommodation.

== Royal Pavilion Office Park ==
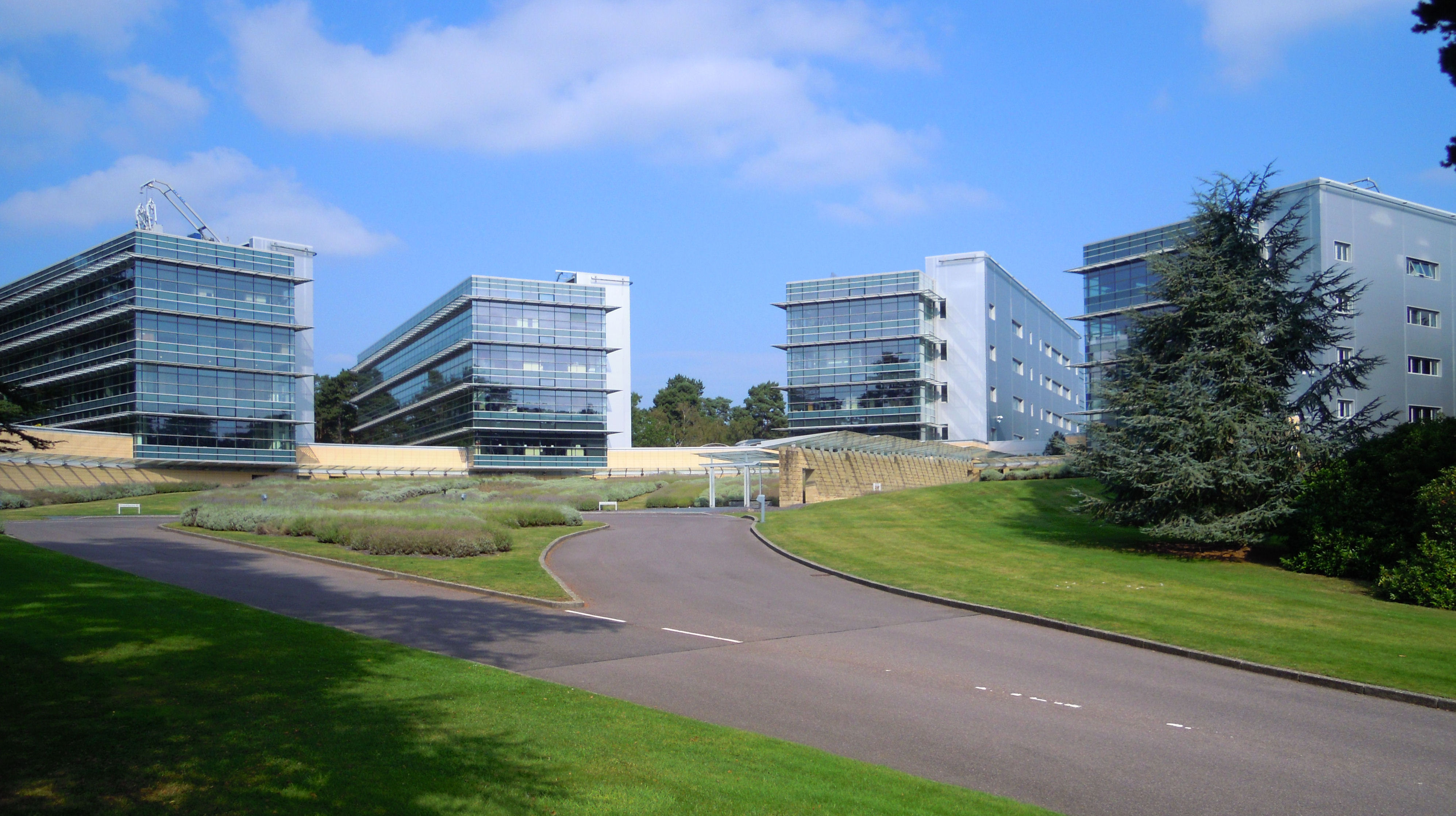
The Royal Pavilion Office Park now occupies the site

The Training Centre was demolished in 1998 and the land sold off to the Computer Sciences Corporation (CSC), a Californian computer services provider. CSC began planning its new European Headquarters on the site of the Royal Pavilion in 1999. The Company had offices scattered over the whole south-east of the United Kingdom and wanted to consolidate most of them in a new base. CSC invited five architects to enter a limited competition to build a £42m headquarters. The winning architect, RTKL Associates, designed the present huge computer science complex and office campus of four interconnected modern buildings set in 43 acres of parkland and woodland, together with extensive parking, meeting rooms, conference facilities, restaurant and coffee bar.

RTKL's design for the Royal Pavilion was commended in the 2003 Corporate Workplace Award of the British Council for Offices (BCO). The name remains, as the address is still "Royal Pavilion". The former Guardroom beside the main entrance has been a Grade II listed building since 1979.

== See also ==
- Royal Pavilion
- Pavillon du Roi
