= 1st Surrey Volunteer Engineers =

- Active: 1861-1863
- Country: United Kingdom
- Branch: Army
- Role: Field Engineering
- Garrison/HQ: Southwark
- Patron: Major-General Sandham RE

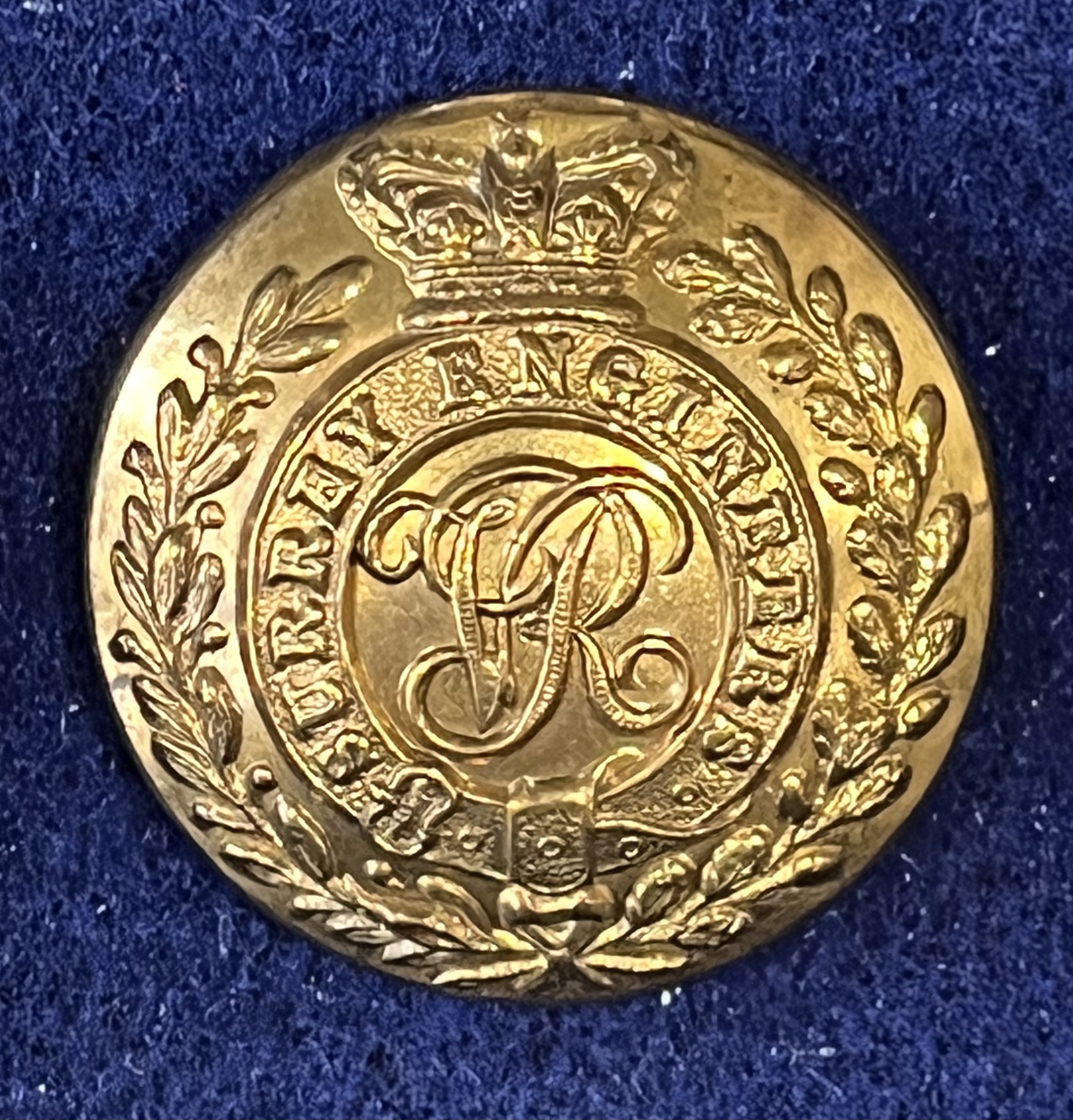
Uniform Button - In gilt, within a Laurel Wreath, the Garter inscribed “Surrey Engineers” surmounted by a Crown. Within the Garter, the Royal Cypher (36L & 24L - Makers Mark "Rivet'd & Solder'd")

1st Surrey Volunteer Engineers was an Engineer Volunteer Corps based in Southwark and formed in September 1861. by Major WM Hemming and commanded by Maj-Gen Sandham RE, although the Corps had requested General Sir Charles William Pashley, KCB to take command.

The Corps had approximately 200 enrolled members in October 1861 including a drum and fife band and a company of volunteer firemen to support the London Fire Brigade. The headquarters of the corps was at Prospect Place, St George's Road, Southwark.

Their uniform was very similar to that of the Royal Engineers. A scarlet tunic with blue facings, blue trousers with scarlet stripes, black busby, chain, and white belts.

The corps' first public appearance was on 11 January 1862 when a portion of them marched out, accompanied by their drum and fife band under the command of the acting adjutant.
