= St George's Road =

Street in the London Borough of Southwark

Coordinates: 51.49611°N 0.10477°W

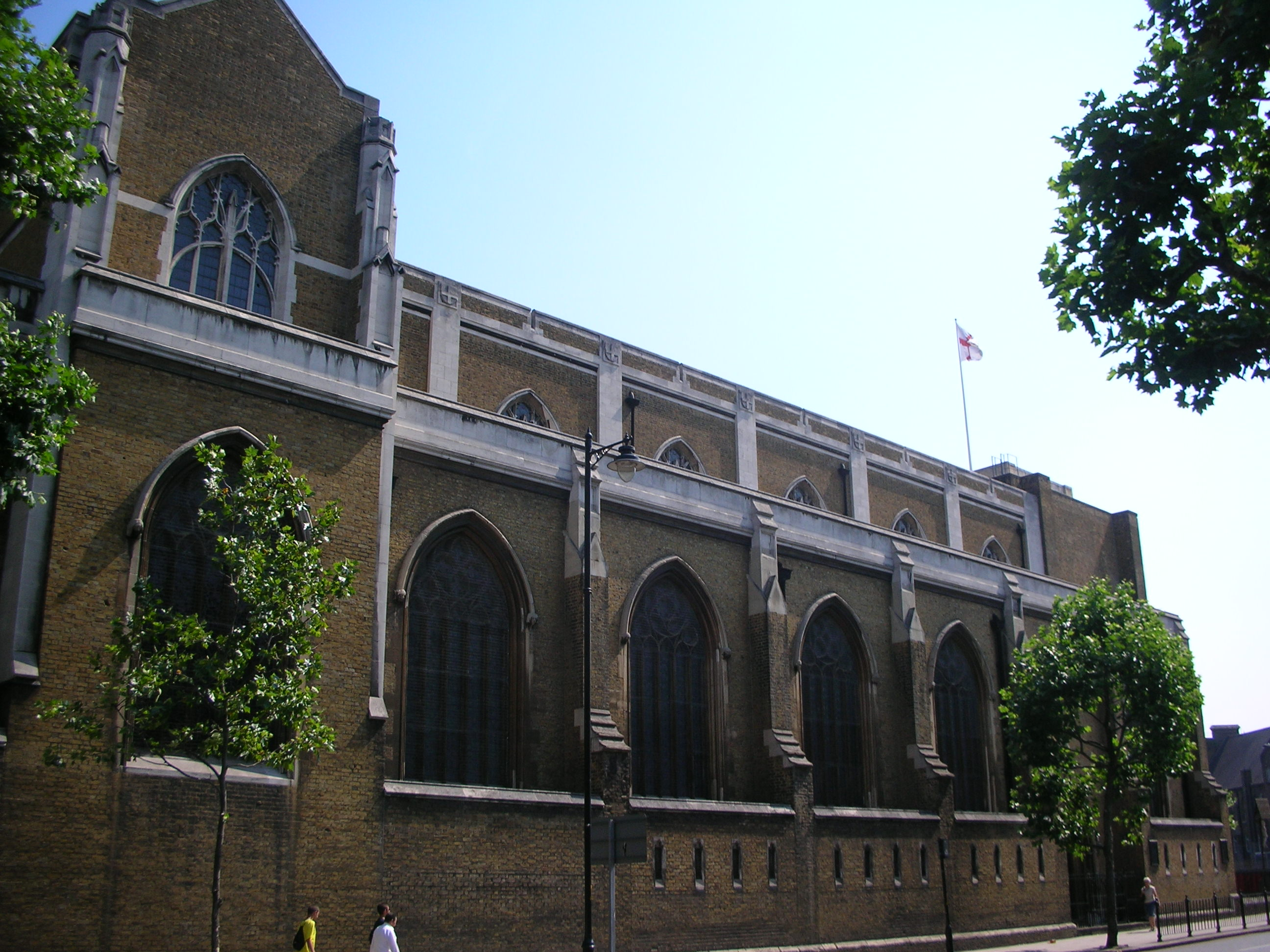
St George's Cathedral from St George's Road.

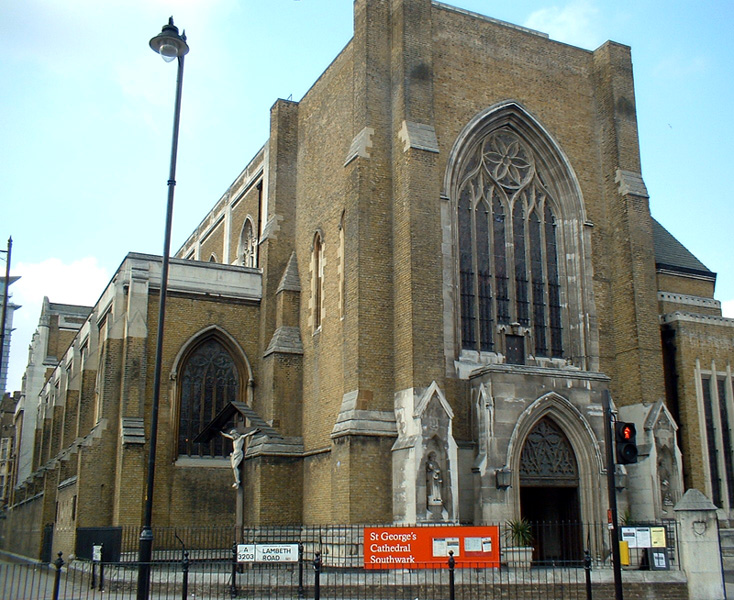
St George's Cathedral main entrance, on the corner of Lambeth Road and St George's Road.

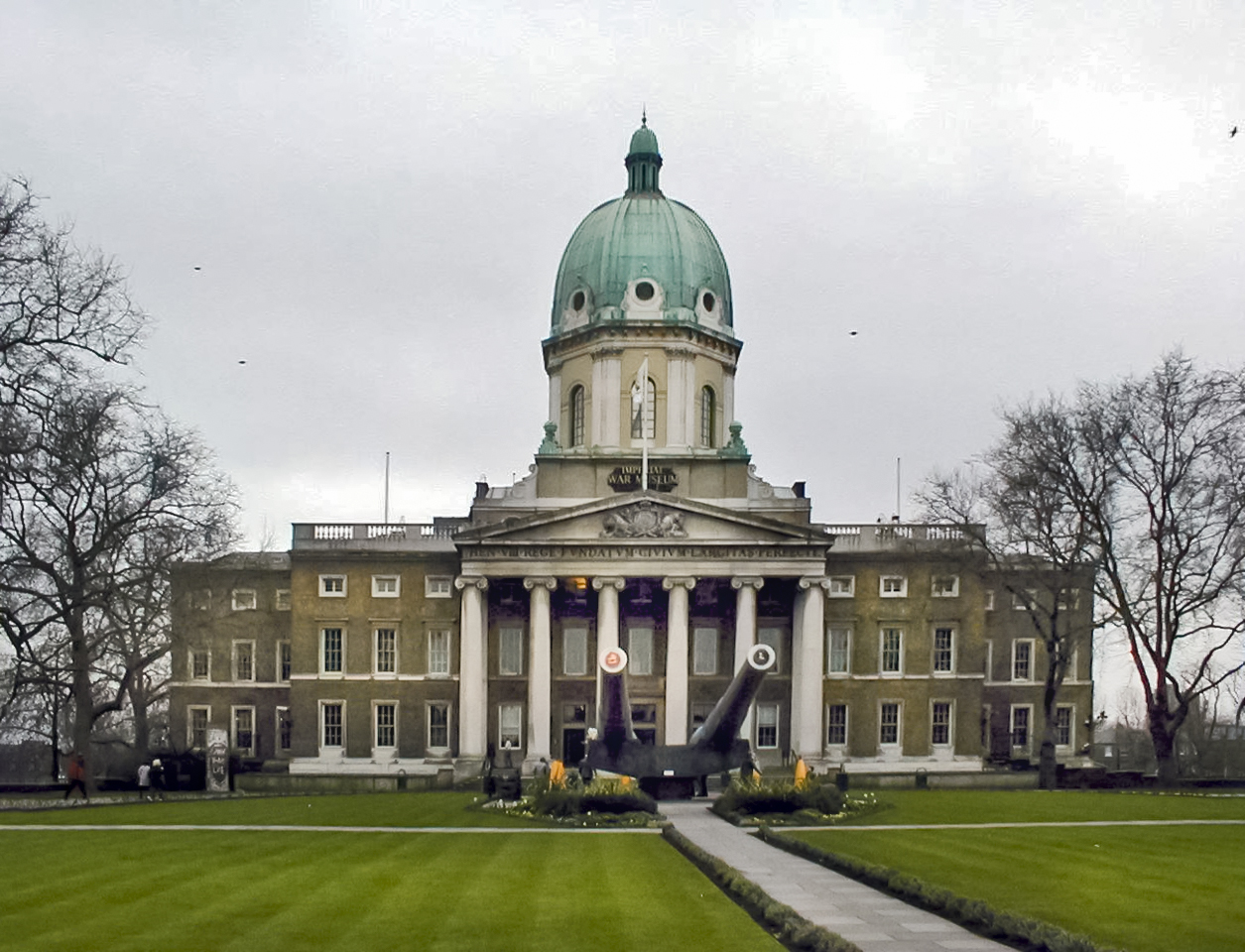
Imperial War Museum off St George's Road.

St George's Road is a one-way road in Southwark, London running between Westminster Bridge Road to the northwest and Elephant and Castle to the southeast. The direction of the vehicular traffic is from Elephant and Castle to Westminster Bridge Road. Its name derives from its crossing of St George's Fields, being an open rural area of the parish of St George the Martyr, Southwark. The road was laid out as part of the communications improvements for Westminster Bridge, from the 1740s, connecting the Bridge to the Elephant and Castle junctions with New Kent Road, Walworth Road and Kennington Park Road (part of the Roman Stane Street).

The north end of St George's Road splits into two, with the left side merging into Westminster Bridge Road northbound, and the right side going around St George's Cathedral and joining Westminster Bridge Road southbound. A listed K2 red telephone box is located at this point.

St George's Cathedral is on the north side and the Imperial War Museum and the surrounding Geraldine Mary Harmsworth Park is on the south side opposite, at the junction with Lambeth Road (A3203). On the west side at this junction is the former Royal South London Dispensary, listed under its subsequent name of the Elizabeth Baxter Hostel. It is now the School of Historical Dress. It was during the refurbishment of the building as the School of Historical Dress that the lettering for the Dispensary was revealed. The London College of Communication is at the Elephant and Castle end of the road.

The north end of St George's Road has a terrace of 21 Grade II listed buildings, which starts at the School of Historical Dress and goes up to the Morley College Gallery, part of Morley College. This terrace was originally known as Laurie Terrace, with the Laurie Terrace lettering still visible above the central building, 125 St George's Road.

West Square, a typical historic and unspoilt London square, is to the south of St George's Road.

The engineer Joseph Clement died at 31 St George's Road on 28 February 1844; the genealogist and author Melville Henry Massue, Marquis de Ruvigny, died at 46 St George's Road on 6 October 1921.

The English builder and architect George Myers is commemorated by a blue plaque at his home in 131 St George's Road where he lived between 1842 and 1853.

The headquarters of the 1st Surrey Volunteer Engineers, a company of volunteer firemen, was at Prospect Place, St George's Road from October 1861.
