= Thread restorer =

Tool used to fix threads on damaged nuts or bolts

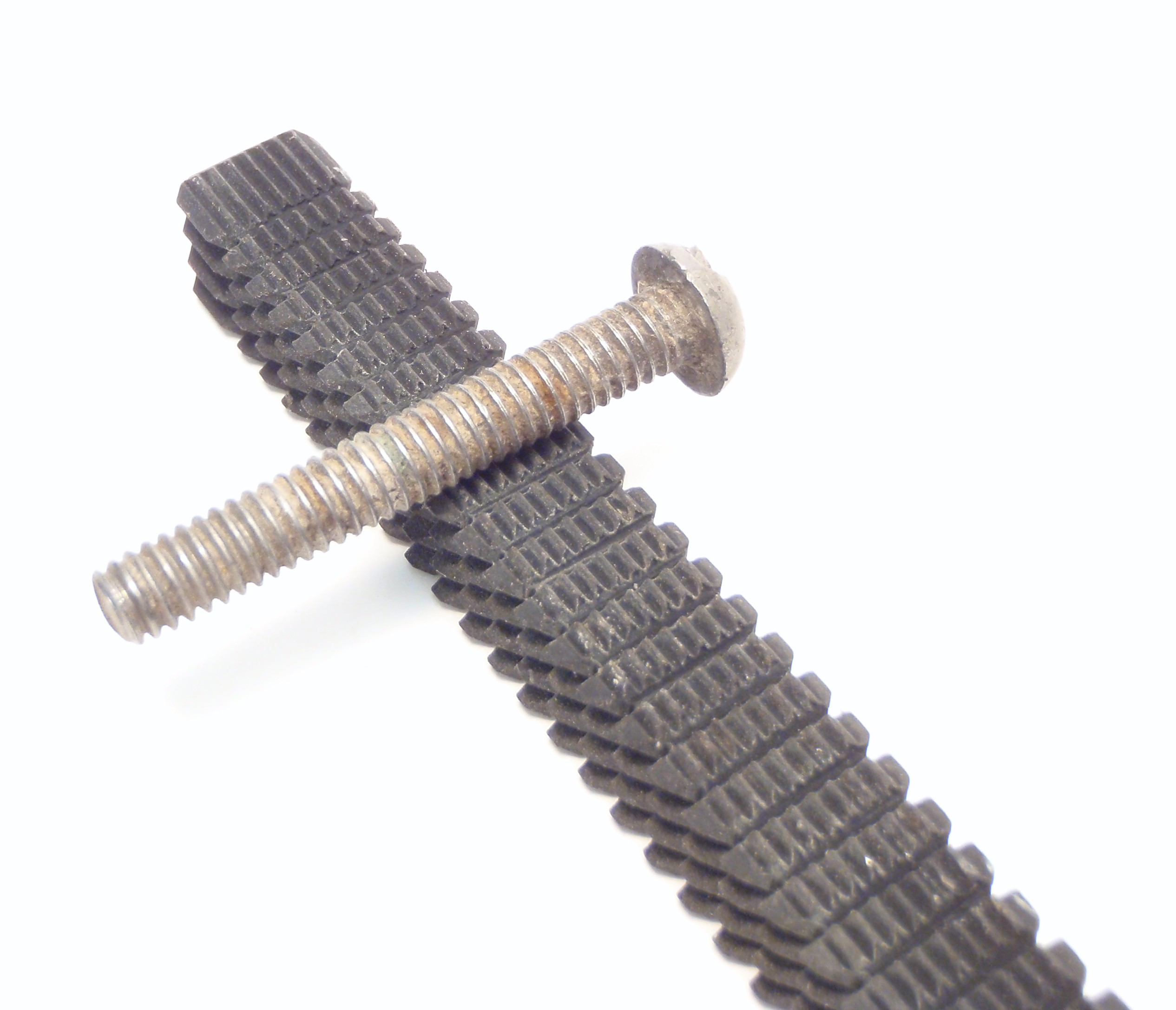
A thread restoring file, one type of thread restorer

A thread restorer is a tool used to fix threads on nuts or bolts that have become damaged. One type of thread restorer is a thread restoring file or thread file. There are other types of thread restoring tools as well, for example a chaser tap or chaser die.

Normal taps and dies can also be used to clean up a thread, which is called chasing. However, using an ordinary tap or die to clean threads generally removes some material, which results in loose threads. Because of this, machinists generally clean threads with special taps and dies—called chasers—made for that purpose. Chasers are made of softer materials and don't cut new threads. However they still fit tighter than actual fasteners, and are fluted like regular taps and dies so debris can escape. Car mechanics, for example, use chasers on spark plug threads, to remove corrosion and carbon build-up.

== See also ==
- Threaded insert, sometimes used for replacing damaged threads
