= Joseph Clement =

British engineer and industrialist

- Born: 13 June 1779; Great Asby, Westmorland
- Died: 28 February 1844 (aged 64); Southwark
- Children: Sarah Clement
- Engineering career
- Discipline: Engineering
- Projects: Charles Babbage's Difference engine
- Awards: Isis medal of the Society for the Encouragement of Arts: 1818, 1827, 1828

Joseph Clement (13 June 1779 – 28 February 1844) was a British engineer and industrialist, chiefly remembered as the maker of Charles Babbage's first difference engine, between 1824 and 1833.

== Biography ==
=== Early life ===
Joseph Clement was born on 13 June 1779 at Great Asby in Westmorland, the son of a hand-loom weaver. Although he was taught to read and write at the local school, he learned mechanics and natural history from his father, Thomas, who had built himself a lathe. He worked, first as a weaver, then as a slater, and learned metalwork from the local blacksmith. With these skills, he built himself his own lathe, on which he turned woodwind musical instruments, which he then learned to play.

By 1805 he was making looms at a factory in Kirkby Stephen, then moved first to Carlisle, then to Glasgow where he learned draughtsmanship from Peter Nicholson. By 1812 he was with Leys, Masson & Co. in Aberdeen, where he attended lectures in natural philosophy at Marischal College.

== Career ==
In 1813, he moved to London, first working for Alexander Galloway in Holborn. He soon left in search of wages more suiting his skills, moving to Joseph Bramah at Pimlico. Bramah doubled the wages Galloway had paid and entered into a formal agreement with Clement for a term of five years, dated 1 April 1814, making him chief draughtsman and superintendent of Bramah's Pimlico works.

Following Bramah's death, Clement took up a position as chief draughtsman at Maudslay, Sons and Field, in Lambeth, where he played a role in the design of the firm's early marine steam engines.

In 1817 he left Maudslay and Field to set up his own firm, encouraged by the Duke of Northumberland, a frequent visitor to Maudslay's works. Clement had managed to save the sum of £500 and took a small workshop at 21 Prospect Place, Newington, where he set up in business as a draughtsman and manufacturer of precision machinery.

In 1818 he was awarded the gold medal of the Society for the Encouragement of Arts for his invention of a machine for marking ellipses, inspired by the trammels used by carpenters.

Clement's main interest was the improvement of self-acting machine tools, and especially lathes. He introduced various improvements in the construction of lathes, being awarded the gold Isis medal of the Society for the Encouragement of Arts in 1827 for his improved lathe which was of unprecedented precision and accuracy. The next year he added his self-adjusting centre chuck to the lathe, for which the Society of Arts awarded him their silver medal.

The same year (1828), Clement began making fluted screw-cutting tap and dies and urged the adoption of a standard system of screw threads where every machine screw of a particular diameter should have a set number of threads of a predetermined pitch and determined the number of threads for each diameter of bolt. Joseph Whitworth, at that time one of Clement's journeymen afterwards played a major role in such standardisation, the Whitworth thread becoming a standard for machine screws.

Regarding Clement's building of planers, Roe (1916) says,

Clement made his first planer in 1820 […]. Some years later he built his "great planer," a remarkable machine from both a mechanical and a financial standpoint. A very full description of it was given by Mr. Varley in the "Transactions of the Society of Arts" in London in 1832, illustrated by a set of copper plates made from Clement's own drawings. Clement's reputation of being the most expert draftsman of his day is well borne out by these drawings. […] It was fitted with centers and was used for planing circular, spiral and conical work as well as flat work. It took in work 6 feet square and was hand-driven. […] For more than ten years it was the only one of its size and it ran for many years night and day on jobbing work, its earnings forming Clement's principal income.

=== Involvement with Charles Babbage ===
The recognised excellence of Clement's machine tools and his skill in precision engineering led to him being employed by Charles Babbage in 1823 to work on his project to design and build his mechanical calculating device, the difference engine. The high prices of his large precision tools led to a falling out with Babbage (at the time workmen were allowed to keep any tools made by them in the course of their work), but his skill and the quality of his products kept him in employment for many years.

=== Later years ===
In later years, Clement returned to music and constructed an organ. He died on 28 February 1844 at 31 St George's Road, Southwark. Although he had never married, he had a daughter, Sarah Clement, by one Agnes Esson from County Durham.

== Bibliography ==
- Oxford Dictionary of National Biography.
- Roe, Joseph Wickham (1916), English and American Tool Builders, New Haven, Connecticut: Yale University Press, LCCN 16011753. Reprinted by McGraw-Hill, New York and London, 1926 (LCCN 27-24075); and by Lindsay Publications, Inc., Bradley, Illinois, (ISBN 978-0-917914-73-7).
- Swade, Doron (2001). The Cogwheel Brain. Abacus. ISBN 0-349-11239-8.
