= George Myers (builder) =

English builder

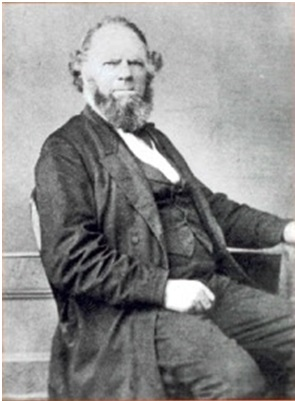
George Myers in the 1860s

George Myers (1803–1875) was an English builder, best known for his work with the architect and designer Augustus Pugin.

== Biography ==
Myers was born in 1803 in Kingston-upon-Hull. He first met Pugin in 1827 while working as an apprentice to the Master Mason of Beverley Minster, William Comins. Myers completed his apprenticeship in 1829, and returned to Kingston-upon-Hull where he set up as a builder, specialising in factories, mills and terraced housing, with his business partner Richard Wilson. In 1837, Pugin commissioned them to build St Mary's Catholic Church in Derby for him.

Myers followed Pugin to London, settling in St George's Road, Southwark in 1842. From here he executed many important commissions for Pugin, including Newcastle, Birmingham, Nottingham and Southwark cathedrals. He also worked for many other architects, and it has been estimated that he built on average three churches a year. In 1852-1854 they were the builders contracted to complete Mentmore Towers in Buckinghamshire for the Rothschild family. The Rothschild family frequently employed George Myers builder for building projects.

In 1853, after the death of his eldest daughter the previous October, Myers moved to Montague House, Clapham Road, Lambeth. He was responsible for building the Royal Pavilion at Aldershot for Prince Albert in 1855. Myers retired in 1874 and in March that year he suffered a serious stroke and sub. He died of exhaustion on 25 January 1875, and was buried at West Norwood Cemetery. His business had passed to his sons on his retirement, but it was already running down, and finally ceased trading in 1876.

== Legacy ==
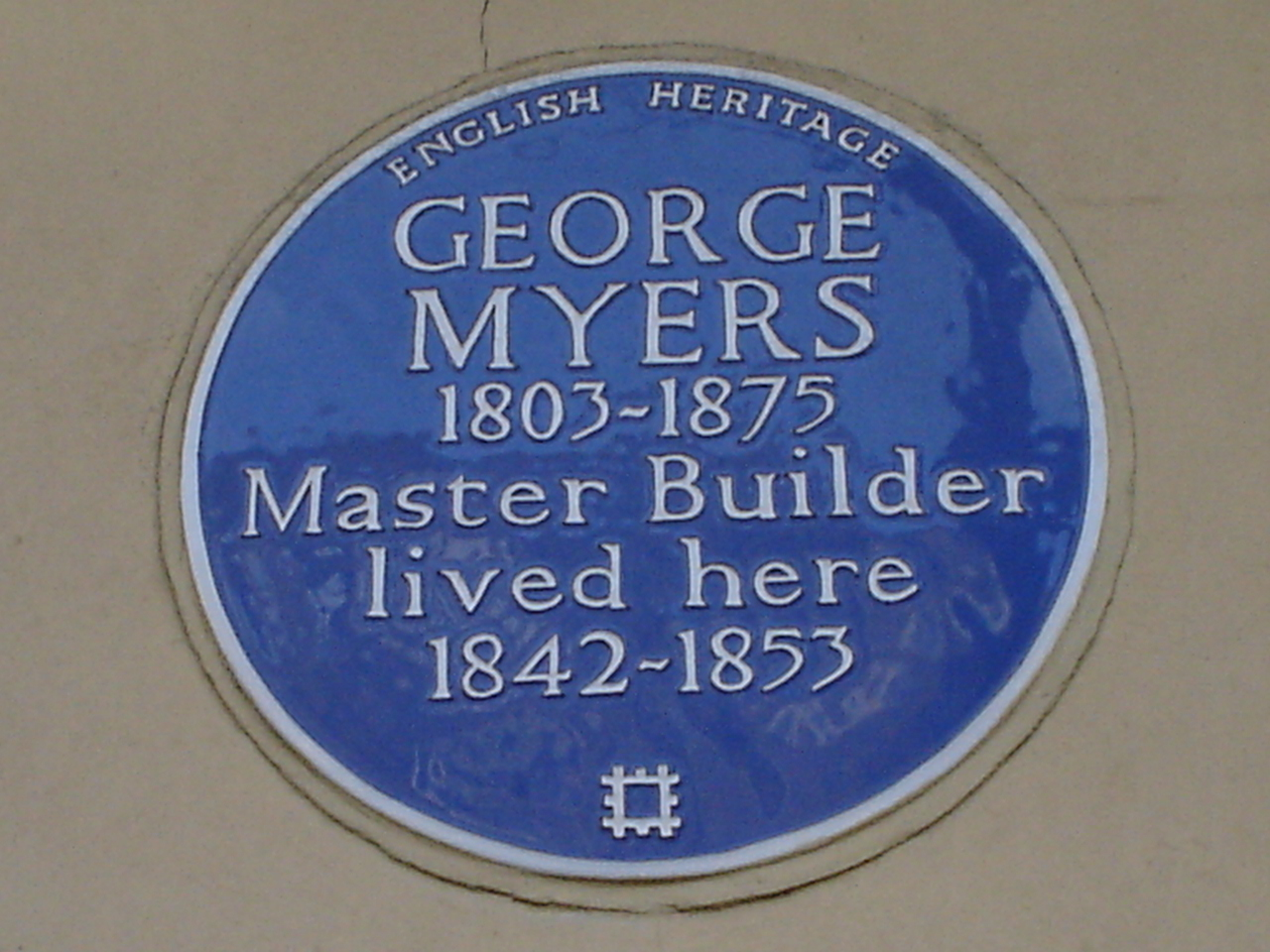
Blue plaque to George Myers on his home at 131 St George's Road, London SE1

Myers is commemorated by a blue plaque at his home in 131 St George's Road. He is also listed in the Oxford Dictionary of National Biography, and is the subject of the biography Pugin's Builder: The Life and Work of George Myers by Patricia Spencer-Silver (ISBN 0859586111).
